= Public housing estates in Ngau Chi Wan =

Public housing in Ngau Chi Wan, Hong Kong

The following shows the public housing estates in Ngau Chi Wan, Wong Tai Sin District, Kowloon, Hong Kong.

== Overview ==
Name		Type	Inaug.	No Blocks	No Units	Notes
Choi Fai Estate	彩輝邨	Public	1995	2	1,351	
Choi Fung Court	彩峰苑	HOS	1997	1	608	
Choi Hung Estate	彩虹邨	Public	1962	11	7,448	
Choi Wan (I) Estate	彩雲(一)邨	Public	1979	16	5,923	
Choi Wan (II) Estate	彩雲(二)邨	Public	1978	5	2,969	
Fu Shan Estate	富山邨	Public	1978	3	1,584	
Grand View Garden	宏景花園	PSPS	1999	6	2,230	
King Hin Court	瓊軒苑	HOS	2002	1	344	
King Lai Court	瓊麗苑	HOS	1989	2	700	
King Shan Court	瓊山苑	HOS	1982	6	1,584	
Kingsford Terrace	嘉峰臺	PSPS	2003	5	2010	
Sun Lai Garden	新麗花園	PSPS	1985	3	600	

=== Fu Shan Estate ===
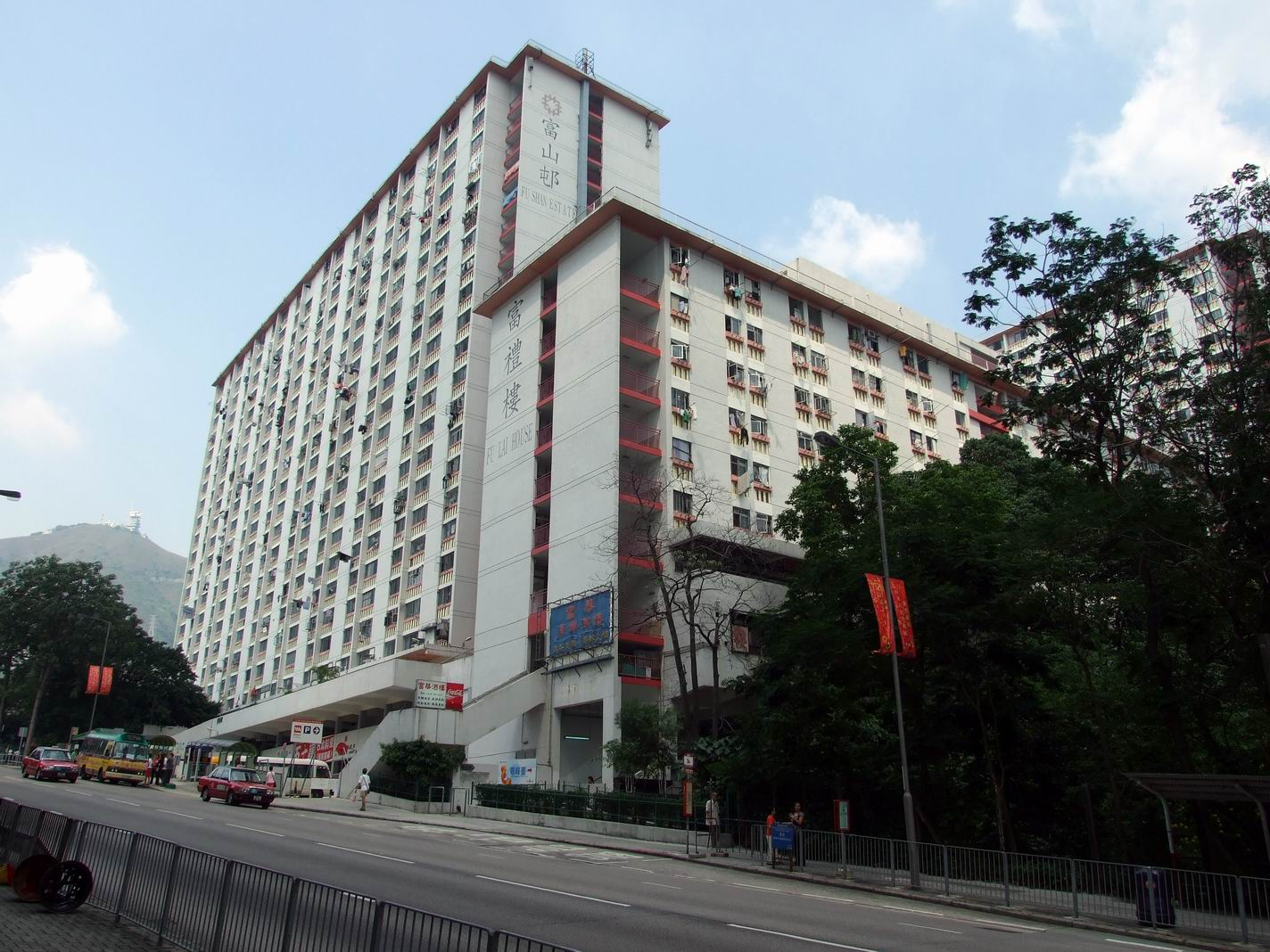
Fu Shan Estate

Fu Shan Estate (Chinese: 富山邨) is located in Diamond Hill, between Hammer Hill and Tsz Wan Shan and near Diamond Hill Crematorium (Chinese: 鑽石山火葬場). It consists of three Old Slab blocks and one non-standard block built in 1978 and 2020, respectively.

Name	Type	Completion
Fu Lai House	Old Slab	1978
Fu Shun House	Old Slab	1978
Fu Yan House	Old Slab	1978
Fu Fai House	Non-standard block (Y-shaped)	2020

Fu Shan Estate is in Primary One Admission (POA) School Net 45. Within the school net are multiple aided schools (operated independently but funded with government money); no government primary schools are in this net.

Hong Kong Public Libraries maintains the Fu Shan Public Library in Fu Yan House, Fu Shan Estate.

=== Grand View Garden ===
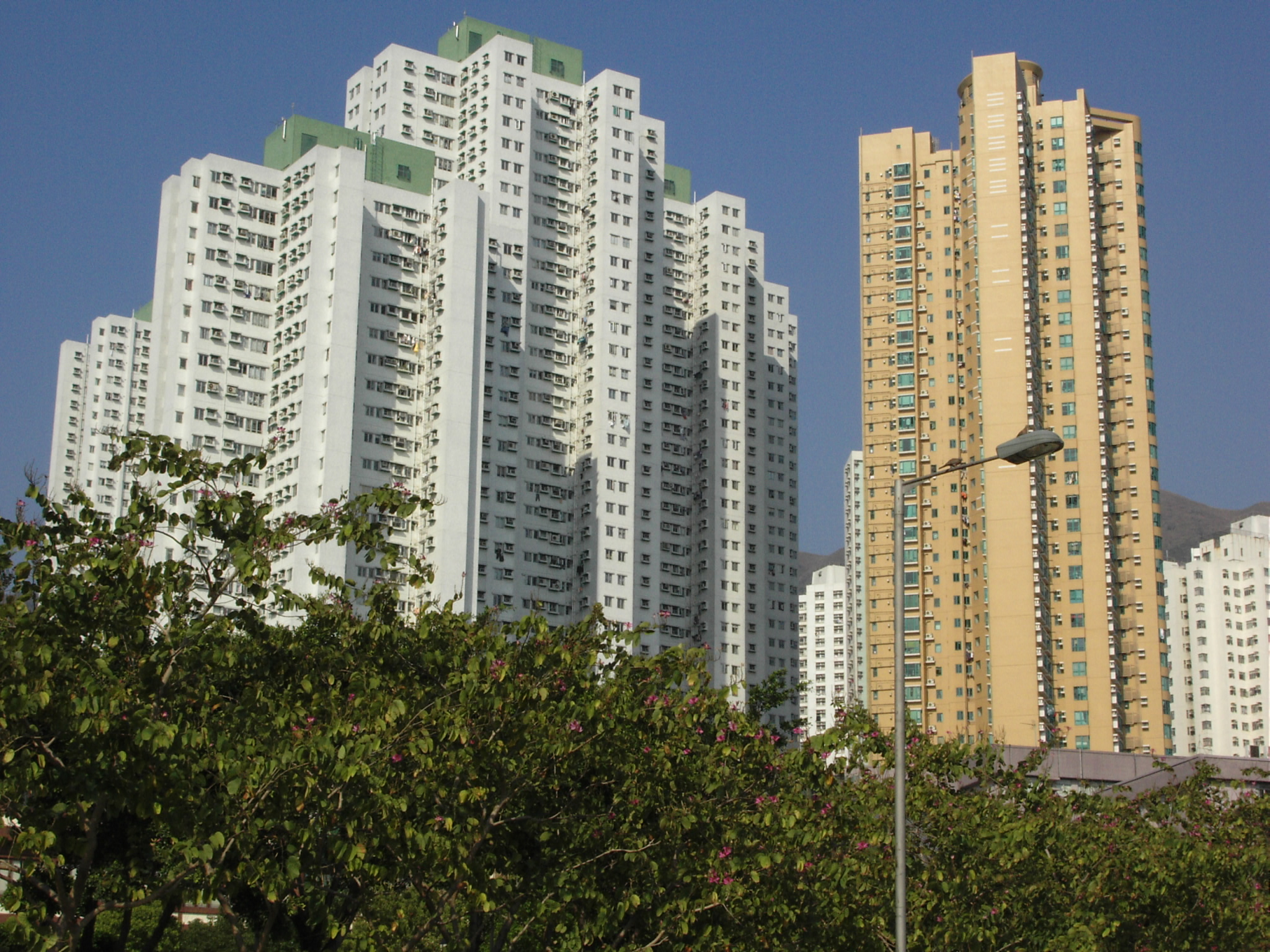
Grand View Garden (left)

Grand View Garden (Chinese: 宏景花園) is a Private Sector Participation Scheme court in Diamond Hill, near Fu Shan Estate. It was jointly developed by the Hong Kong Housing Authority and Chun Wo Group. It has six blocks completed in 1999.

Name	Type	Completion
Tower 1	PSPS	1999
Tower 2	PSPS	1999
Tower 3	PSPS	1999
Tower 4	PSPS	1999
Tower 5	PSPS	1999
Tower 6	PSPS	1999

=== King Hin Court ===
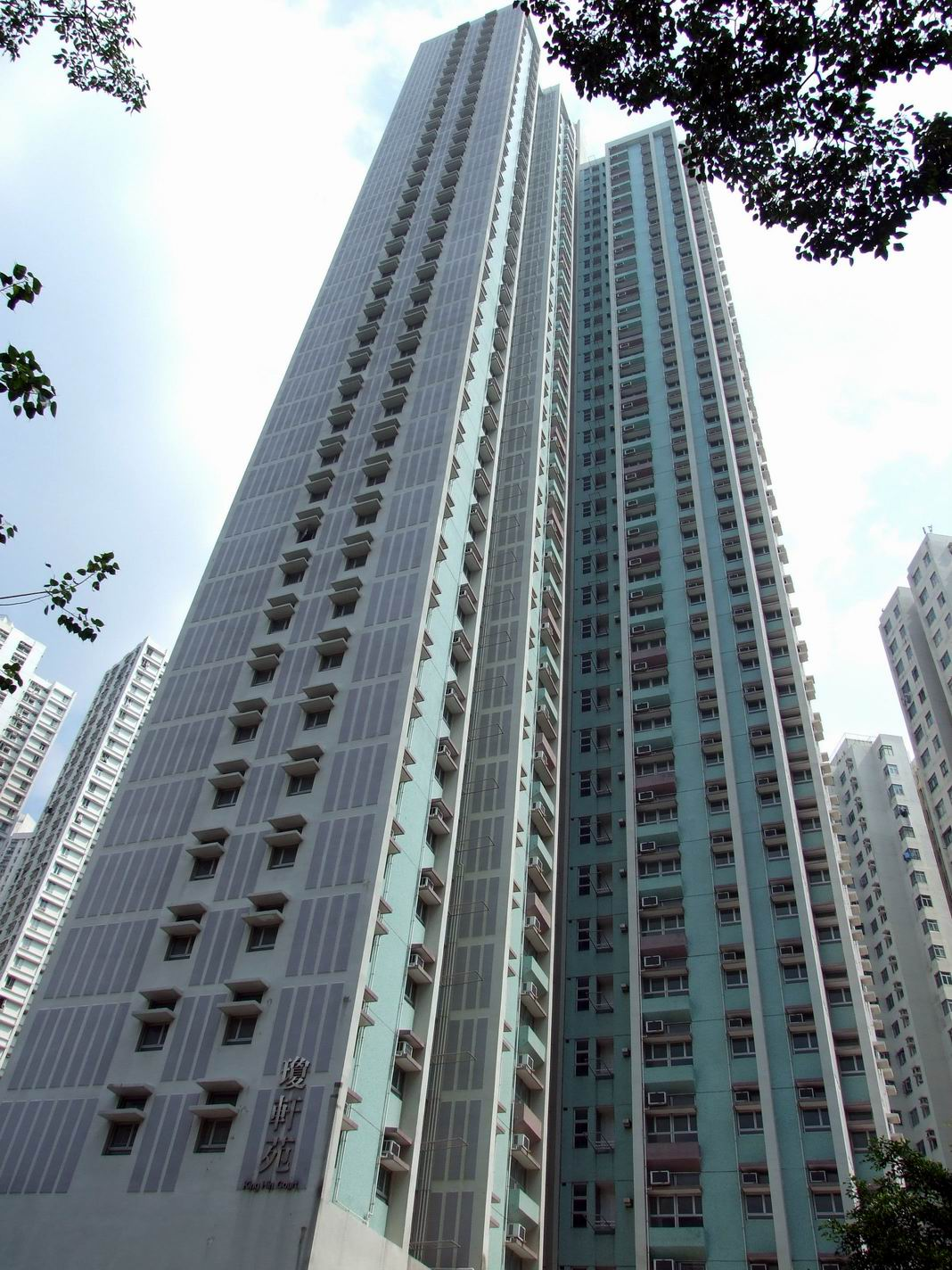
King Hin Court

King Hin Court (Chinese: 瓊軒苑) is a Home Ownership Scheme court in Diamond Hill, near Fu Shan Estate. It has only one block completed in 2002. However, the sales of the court was suspended after the government announced the suspension of HOS courts afterwards. During the SARS outbreak in 2003, the court was furnished as temporary quarters for frontline medical staff in order to minimize the chance of infection among them and their families. It was re-sold under the Sales of Surplus HOS Flats Phase 4.

Name	Type	Completion
King Hin Court	New Cruciform Block (Ver.1984)	2002

=== King Lai Court ===
King Lai Court (Chinese: 瓊麗苑) is a Home Ownership Scheme court in Diamond Hill, near King Shan Court and Kingsford Terrace. It has two blocks built in 1989.

Name	Type	Completion
King Cheong House	NCB (Ver.1984)	1989
King Tai House	NCB (Ver.1984)	1989

=== King Shan Court ===
King Shan Court (Chinese: 瓊山苑) is a Home Ownership Scheme court in Diamond Hill, near Fu Shan Estate. It has six blocks built in 1982 and it is the earliest HOS court built in Diamond Hill.

Name	Type	Completion
King Fung House	Flexi 1	1982
King Pik House	Flexi 1	1982
King Kui House	Flexi 1	1982
King Ying House	Flexi 1	1982
King Yiu House	Flexi 1	1982
King Wai House	Flexi 1	1982

King Shan Court is in Primary One Admission (POA) School Net 45. Within the school net are multiple aided schools (operated independently but funded with government money); no government primary schools are in this net.

=== Kingsford Terrace ===
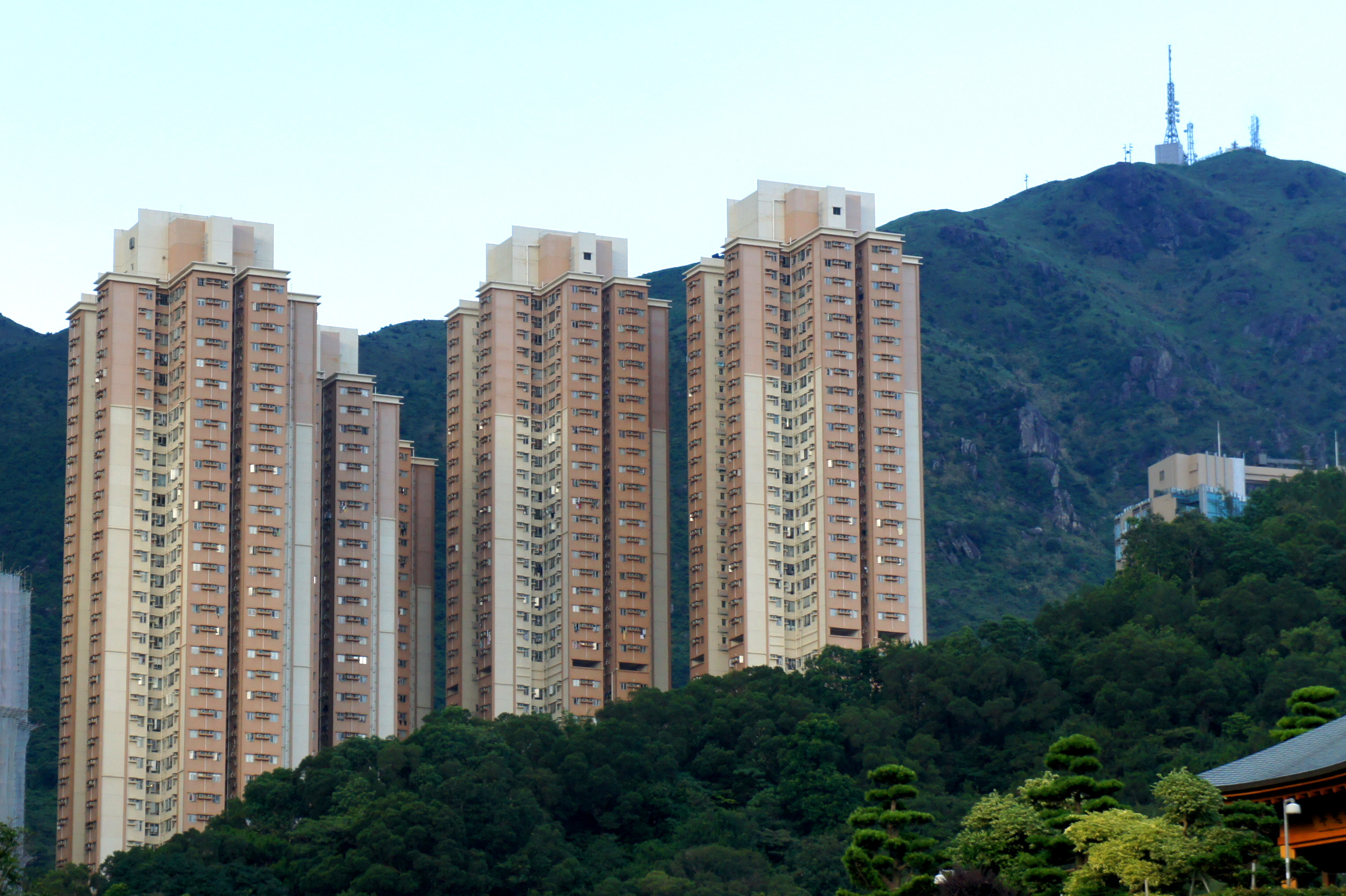
Kingsford Terrace

Kingsford Terrace (Chinese: 嘉峰臺) is a Home Ownership Scheme and Private Sector Participation Scheme court in Ngau Chi Wan, near King Lai Court, which was jointly developed by Hong Kong Housing Authority and New World Development. It has totally 5 blocks built in 2003. However, its sales was suspended after the Hong Kong SAR Government announced the suspension of selling HOS courts. In 2004, the Government spent HK$1.4 billion to buy back all the flats of the court from New World Development. In 2007, the flats were re-sold to public through the Sales of Surplus HOS Flats Phase 1 and 2.

Kingsford Terrace is in Primary One Admission (POA) School Net 45. Within the school net are multiple aided schools (operated independently but funded with government money); no government primary schools are in this net.

Name	Type	Completion
Block 1	PSPS	2003
Block 2	PSPS	2003
Block 3	PSPS	2003
Block 4	PSPS	2003
Block 5	PSPS	2003

=== Sun Lai Garden ===
Sun Lai Garden (Chinese: 新麗花園) is a Home Ownership Scheme and Private Sector Participation Scheme court in Ngau Chi Wan, near King Hin Court and Grand View Garden. It was jointly developed by Hong Kong Housing Authority and Sun Hung Kai Properties. It has 3 blocks, which were completed in 1985.

Name	Type	Completion
Block 1	PSPS	1985
Block 2	PSPS	1985
Block 3	PSPS	1985

== See also ==
- List of public housing estates in Hong Kong
