= Choi Wan Estate =

Public housing estate in Kowloon, Hong Kong

Coordinates: 22.3345°N 114.2143°E

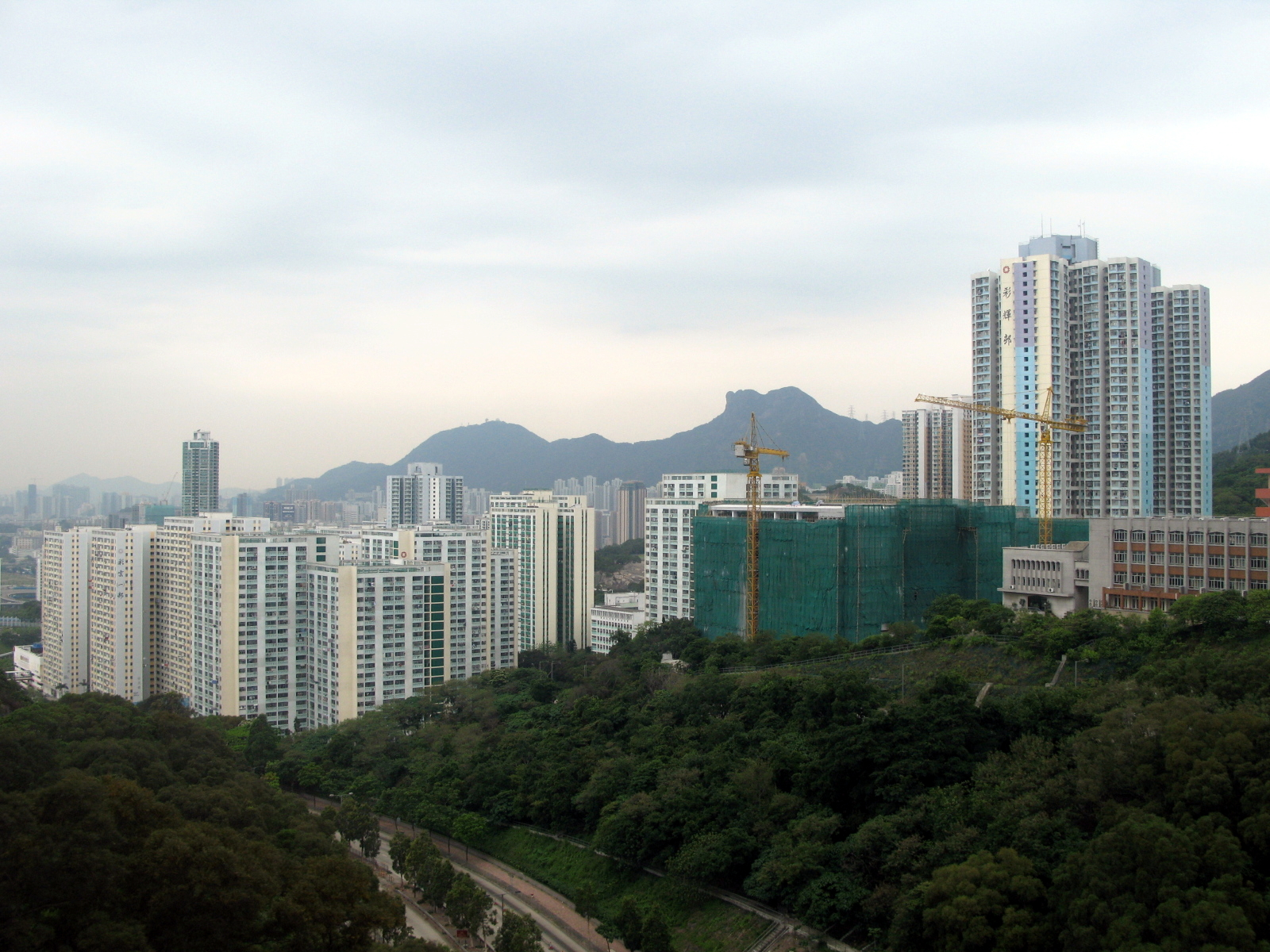
- Choi Wan Estate
- Traditional Chinese: 彩雲邨
- Simplified Chinese: 彩云邨
- Cantonese Yale: chói wàhn chyūn
Transcriptions
Standard Mandarin
- Hanyu Pinyin: Cǎiyún Cūn
Yue: Cantonese
- Yale Romanization: chói wàhn chyūn
- Jyutping: coi2 wan4 cyun1

Choi Wan Estate (Chinese: 彩雲邨) is a public housing estate in Ngau Chi Wan, Wong Tai Sin District, Kowloon, Hong Kong, located between Ngau Chi Wan Village and Jordan Valley and the foot of Fei Ngo Shan. The estate is divided into Choi Wan (I) Estate (彩雲(一)邨) and Choi Wan (II) Estate (彩雲(二)邨), and has a total of 21 blocks. It is one of the largest public housing estates in Wong Tai Sin District.

== Background ==
Choi Wan Estate was the site of Ngau Chi Wan Village. Its name Choi Wan fits its geographical position because "Wan" (i.e. Choi Wan Estate, "Wan" means cloud in Cantonese) is above "Hung" (i.e. Choi Hung Estate, "Hung" means rainbow in Cantonese). The estate started construction in 1976 and finished in 1979.

Choi Wan Estate is one of the few public housing estates in Hong Kong which blocks are not named with character in the estate name (i.e. "Choi" or "Wan"). Instead, the blocks are named based on the Chinese astronomical matters, for instance, Ngan Ho House (銀河樓, lit. galaxy house) and Koon Yat House (觀日樓, "Koon Yat" meaning "viewing the sun"). The estate is also the namesake for the northwestern Pacific Ocean tropical cyclone name Choi-wan.

== Houses ==
=== Choi Wan (I) Estate ===
Name	Type	Completion
Koon Yat House	Double H	1979
Boon Yuet House	Double H	1979
King San House	Old Slab	1980
Pak Hung House	Double H	1980
Cheung Bor House	Double H	1980
Ngan Ho House	Double H	1980
Sau Man House	Double H	1980
Chi Siu House	Double H	1980
Fei Fung House	Double H	1980
Yau Lung House	Double H	1980
Yat Yuet House	Double H	1980
Sing San House	Double H	1980
Sze Yu House	Double H	1980
Kam Lam House	Double H	1980
Pak Fung House	Double H	1981
Yuk Lun House	Double H	1981

=== Choi Wan (II) Estate ===
Name	Type	Completion
Fung Chak House	Twin Tower	1978
Ming Lai House	Twin Tower	1978
Kai Fai House	Twin Tower	1978
Yok Yu House	Double H	1979
King Kung House	Double H	1979

== Choi Fai Estate ==
Choi Fai Estate (Chinese: 彩輝邨) is a public housing estate in Ngau Chi Wan, at the upper hill above Choi Wan Estate and the foot of Fei Ngo Shan. It has only 2 blocks built in 1995.

=== Houses ===
Name	Type	Completion
Choi Wah House	Harmony 1	1995
Choi Yip House	Harmony 1	1995

== Choi Fung Court ==
Choi Fung Court (Chinese: 彩峰苑) is a Home Ownership Scheme court in Ngau Chi Wan, near Choi Wan (I) Estate. It has one block built in 1997.

=== Houses ===
Name	Type	Completion
Choi Fung Court	Harmony	1997

== Education ==
Choi Wan Estate, Choi Fai Estate, and Choi Fung Court are in Primary One Admission (POA) School Net 45. Within the school net are multiple aided schools (operated independently but funded with government money); no government primary schools are in this net.

== See others ==
- Ngau Chi Wan
- Choi Hung Estate
