= Serene Oasis =

Horticulture therapy garden in Hong Kong

- 心靈綠洲
- Logo
- Location: 2A Kwun Tong Road; Kwun Tong District, New Kowloon, Hong Kong
- Created: 2010
- Owner: Christian Family Service Centre
- Status: Open
- Public transit: Choi Hung station
- Website: oasis.ha.org.hk

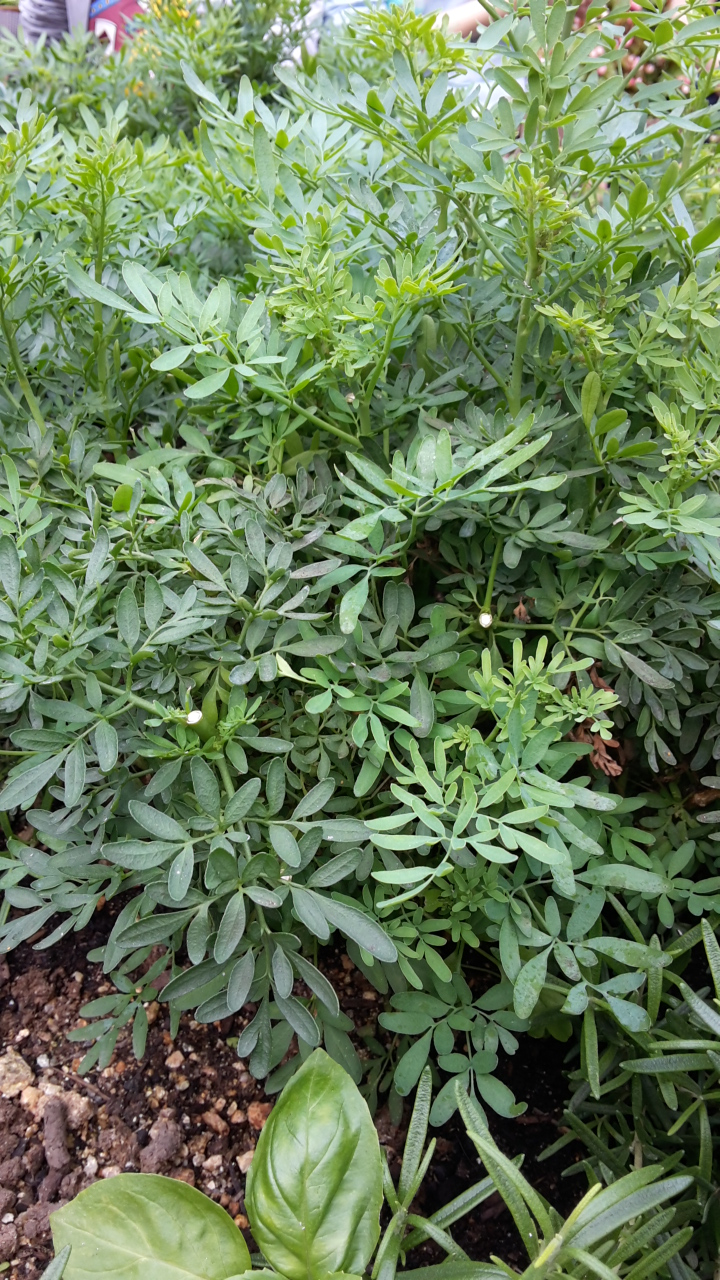
Mimosa to stimulate the sense of smell

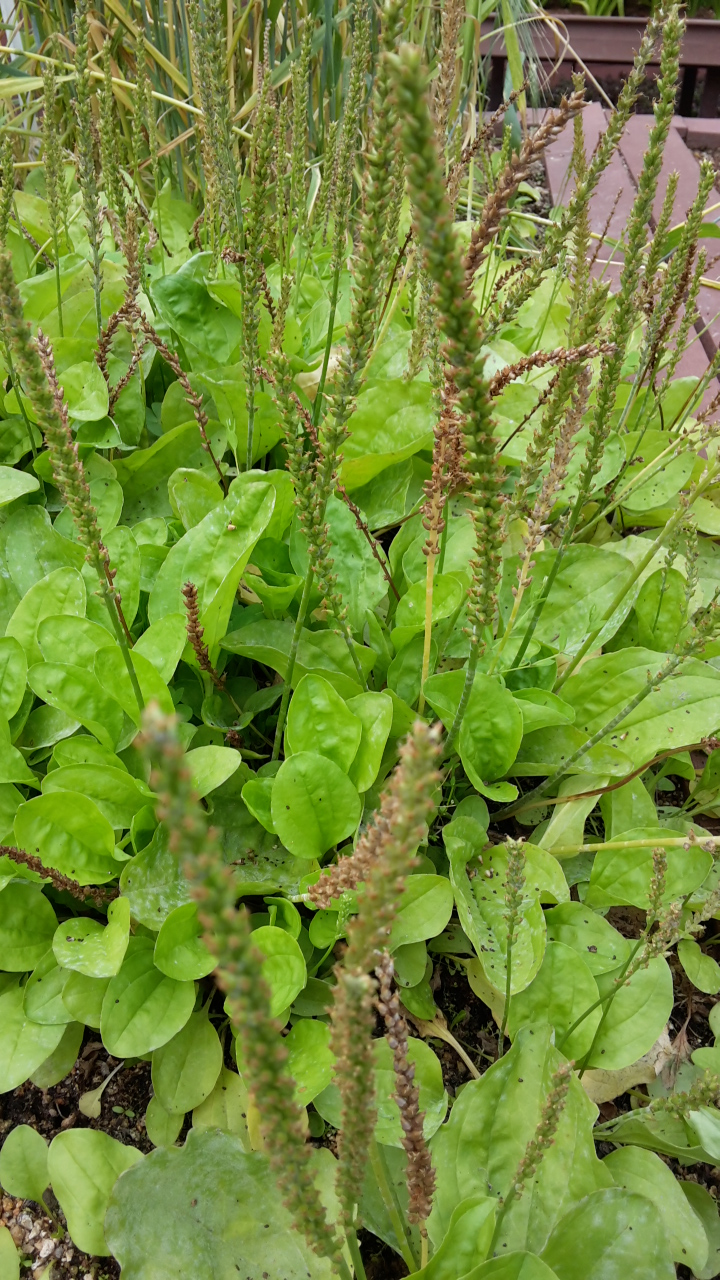
Wheat to stimulate the sense of touch

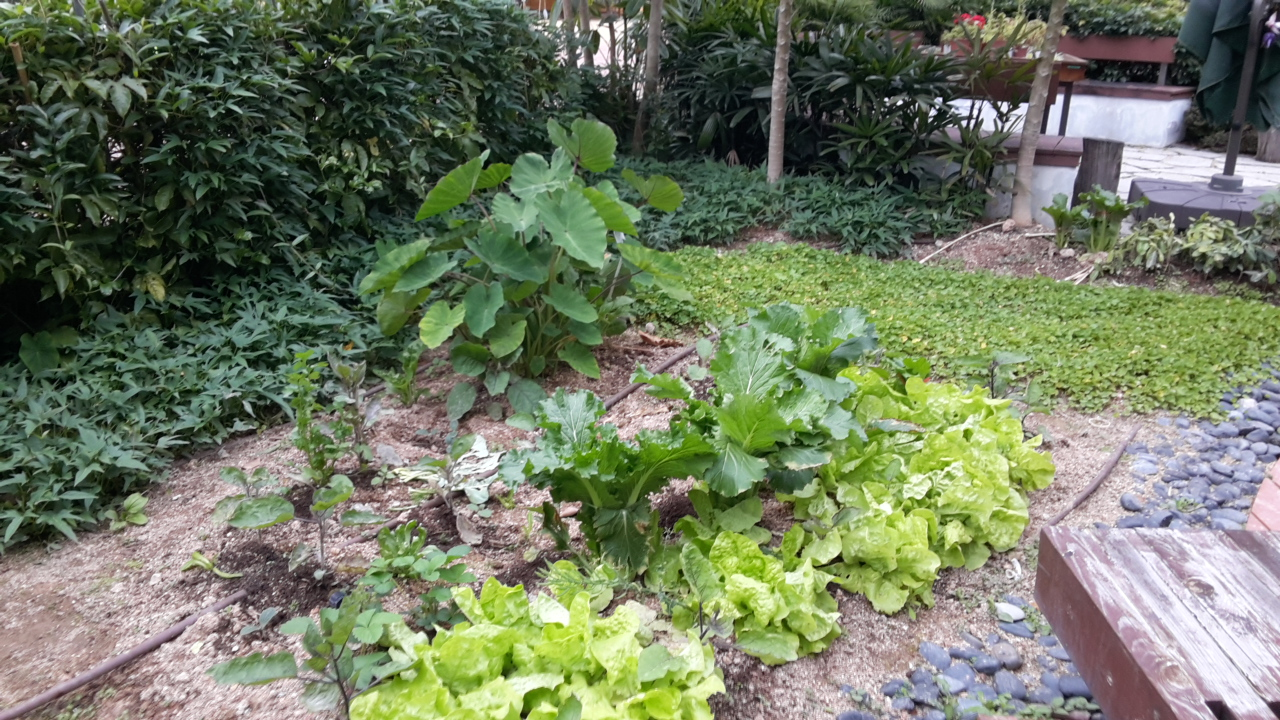
Leaves of carrots at Serene Oasis

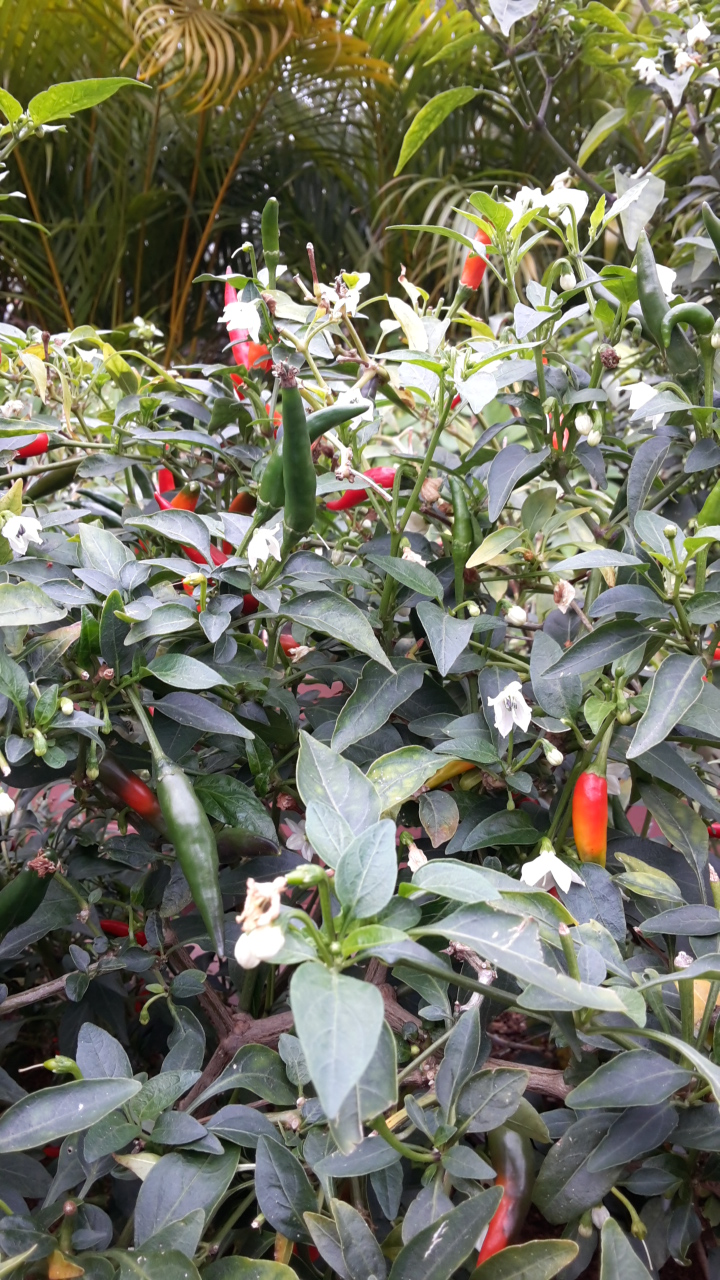
Hot pepper to stimulate the sense of taste

Serene Oasis (traditional Chinese: 心靈綠洲; simplified Chinese: 心灵绿洲) is a garden on Kwun Tong Road in Kowloon, Hong Kong. Launched in 2010 for a two-year trial period for horticulture therapy, Serene Oasis opened more broadly to the public in 2013. It is the first and largest garden in Hong Kong used for horticulture therapy. Its major goal is to improve the condition of people suffering from mental illnesses such as dementia and depression. The garden has more than 100 species of plants.

== History ==
The Christian Family Service Centre started an initiative in 2010 to allow community members to perform urban farming in an accessible space. For the purpose of urban farming, the centre rented an urban open space owned by the government at Choi Hung Interchange near Choi Hung Estate. The rented land had not been used for over a decade. A condition of the centre's use of the land is that it cannot construct buildings on it. The first phase of the initiative was Serene Oasis, a garden that launched in 2010. It is Hong Kong's first and largest horticultural therapy garden. For two years, Serene Oasis put on a trial programme of horticultural therapy before being opened more broadly to the public in 2013. The second phase of the project was Urban Oasis, which is 20,000 square feet (1,900 m^{2}). Urban Oasis has 350 tiny gardens that people can rent to do farming. Located at Kwun Tong Road, Serene Oasis is roughly 7,000 square feet (650 m^{2}) and is a small section of Urban Oasis that is used for horticultural therapy.

The centre published a book in 2014 titled Practice Manual of Horticultural Therapy (Chinese: 園藝治療實務工作手冊). Authored by Lo Di (Chinese: 羅廸), a horticultural therapy assistant and program development manager at the centre, the book draws on scholars' theories about horticultural therapy and the centre's experience with the therapy at Serene Oasis. The book's intended audience is horticultural therapy volunteers and workers so that they become familiar with the therapy and can better prepare treatment activities.

== Garden features and horticultural therapy ==
Serene Oasis offers community members afflicted with dementia and depression the opportunity to do horticultural therapy, allowing them to do gardening together. The centre runs horticultural therapy classes, each containing roughly eight patients and lasting for six to eight sessions. The sessions are between 60 and 90 minutes. By 2013, 856 people had gone through a horticultural therapy class at Serene Oasis, while had 270 completed training to be horticultural therapy assistants. Serene Oasis' horticultural therapy classes allow students to experience their five senses. Hong Kong Economic Times writer Yue-wah Lee found that in the garden, parents and their children can experience auditory, taste, tactile, olfactory, and visual sensations and undergo slow living.

Filled with trees and colourful plants, the garden has warbling birds and fragrant flowers. There are walls with water flowing out of them, making gurgling noises. There are hundreds of species of plants including mint leaves, Persian grass, lemongrass, and rosemary. When people touch one of the plant's leaves, the leaves feel thick and fluffy and leave a fragrance on their fingers. To stimulate people's sense of taste, the garden has onions and ginger. To stimulate people's visual system, there are colourful flowers like rose periwinkle. To stimulate their sense of smell, there is Thai basil and lemongrass. Drawn by the greenery, birds and insects like cicadas who live in the garden make sounds.

A horticultural therapy assistant guides the patients to do gardening of plants that Hong Kong people typically consume such as ginger and scallions. After planting seeds, the patients water and fertilise the plants. There are raised flower beds accessible to people in wheelchairs. The patients, people with Alzheimer's and depression, usually are being taken care of. The horticultural therapy sessions enable them to become the plants' caretaker with the aim of giving them a stronger sense of community and a more positive opinion of themselves.
