= Ngau Chi Wan Village =

Village in Hong Kong

Coordinates: 22.335612°N 114.208841°E

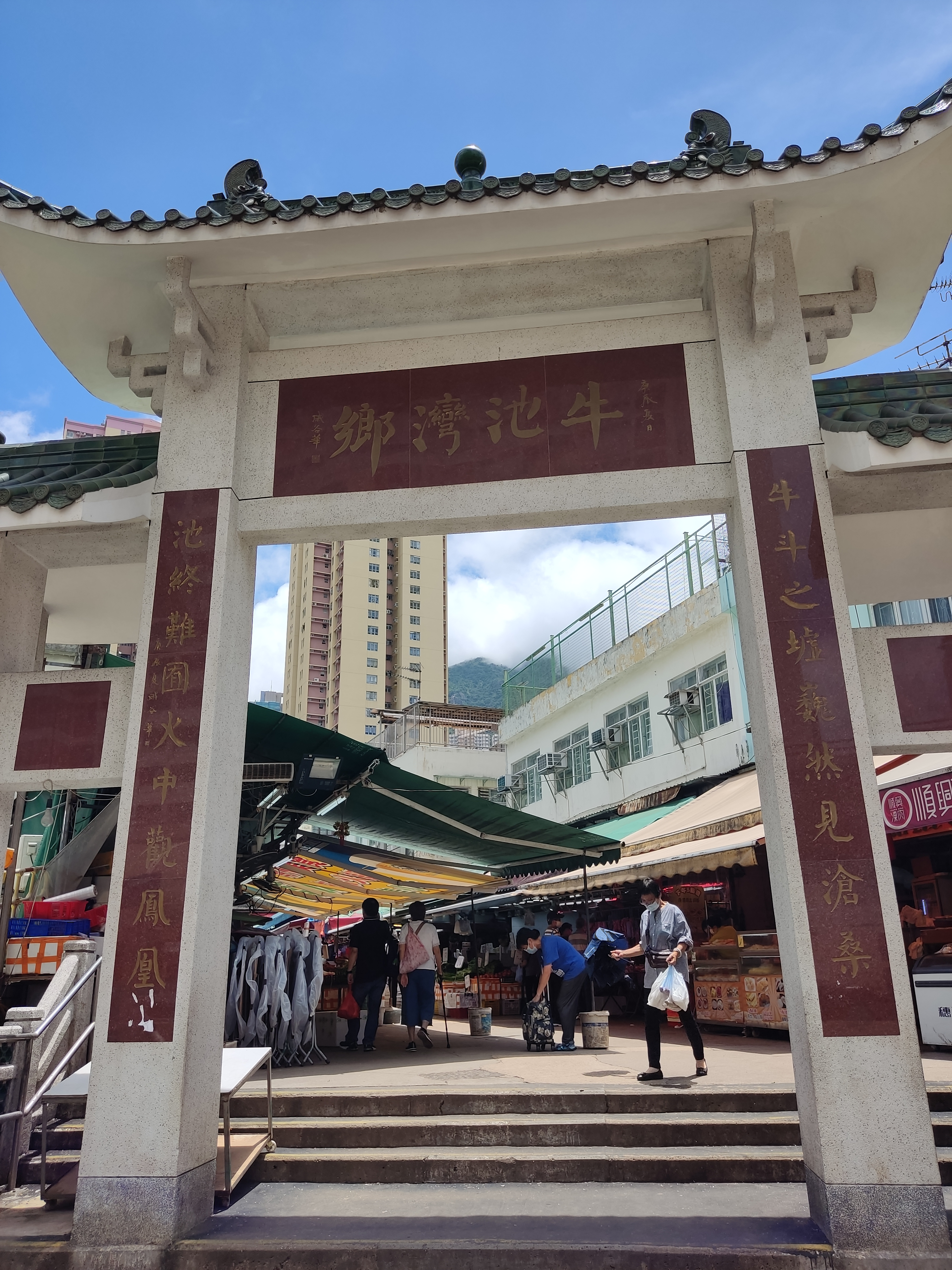
- Paifang of Ngau Chi Wan Village, along Lung Cheung Road
- Traditional Chinese: 牛池灣鄉
- Simplified Chinese: 牛池灣鄉
Transcriptions
Standard Mandarin
- Hanyu Pinyin: Niú chí wān xiāng

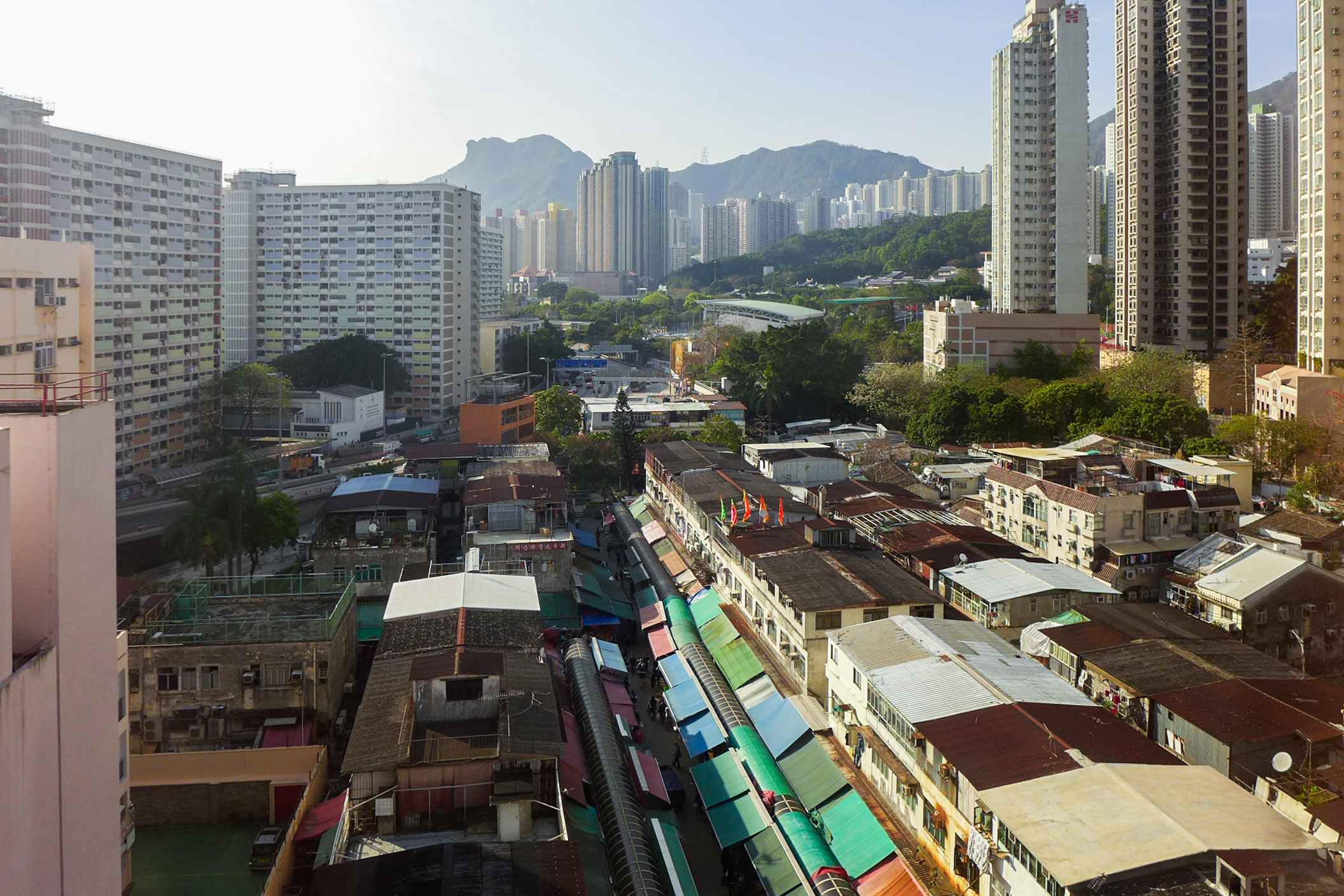
Ngau Chi Wan Village. The buildings on the left are part of Choi Hung Estate. Lion Rock is visible in the background.

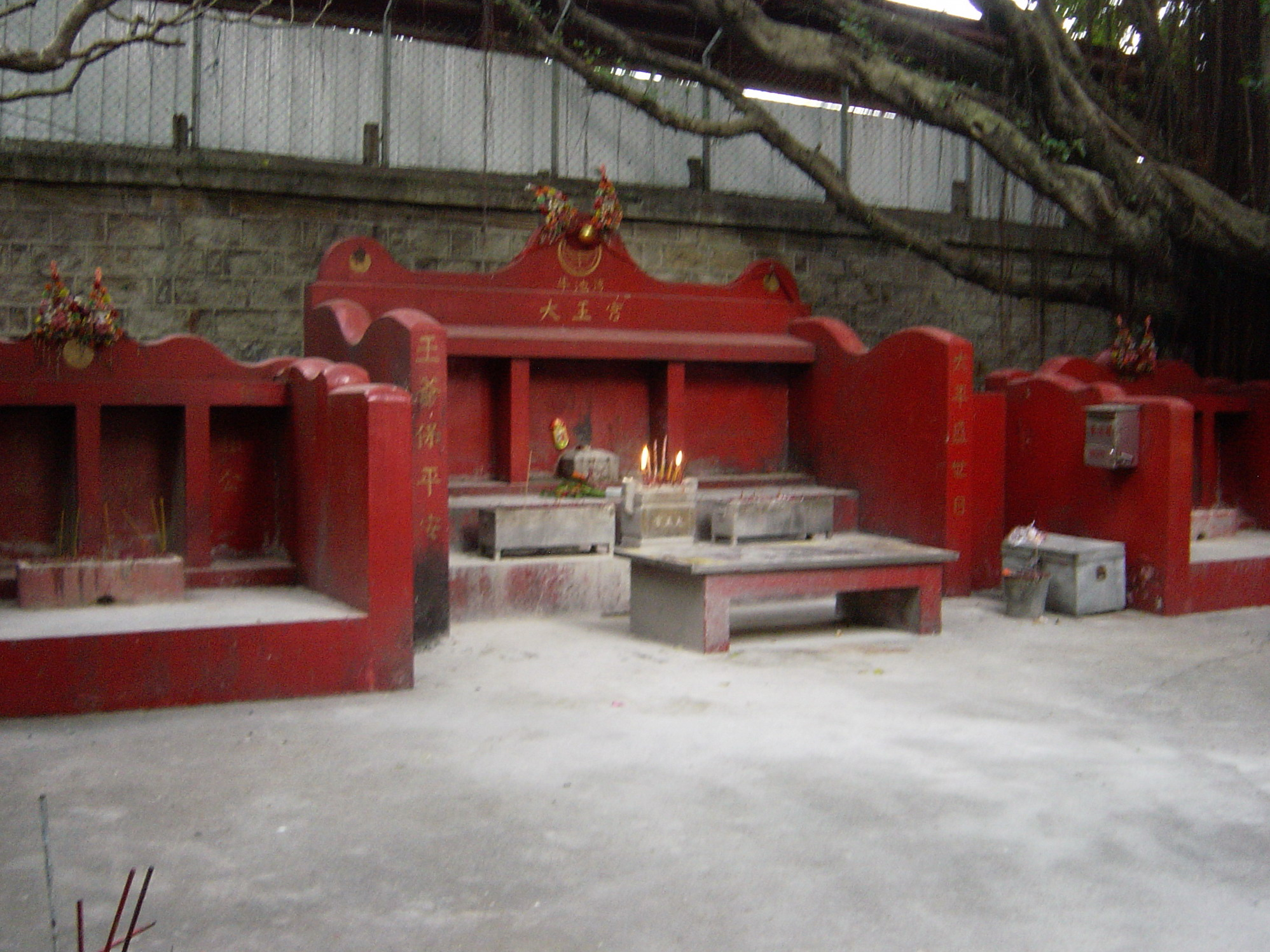
Tai Wong Temple in Ngau Chi Wan Village in December 2006.

Ngau Chi Wan Village (Chinese: 牛池灣鄉) is a village in Ngau Chi Wan, in Wong Tai Sin District, Hong Kong.

== History ==
In the past the village was mostly inhabited by war and political refugees from mainland China.

In the 2019 and 2020 policy addresses, the chief executive stated that the government intends to take back possession of the remaining Ngau Chi Wan Village and to redevelop the land into high-density public housing.

== Transport ==
Ngau Chi Wan Village is served by the Choi Hung station of the MTR.

== See also ==
- Cha Kwo Ling
- Nga Tsin Wai Tsuen
