= Wong Tai Sin District =

District in Hong Kong

Wong Tai Sin 黃大仙區
- District
- Wong Tai Sin District
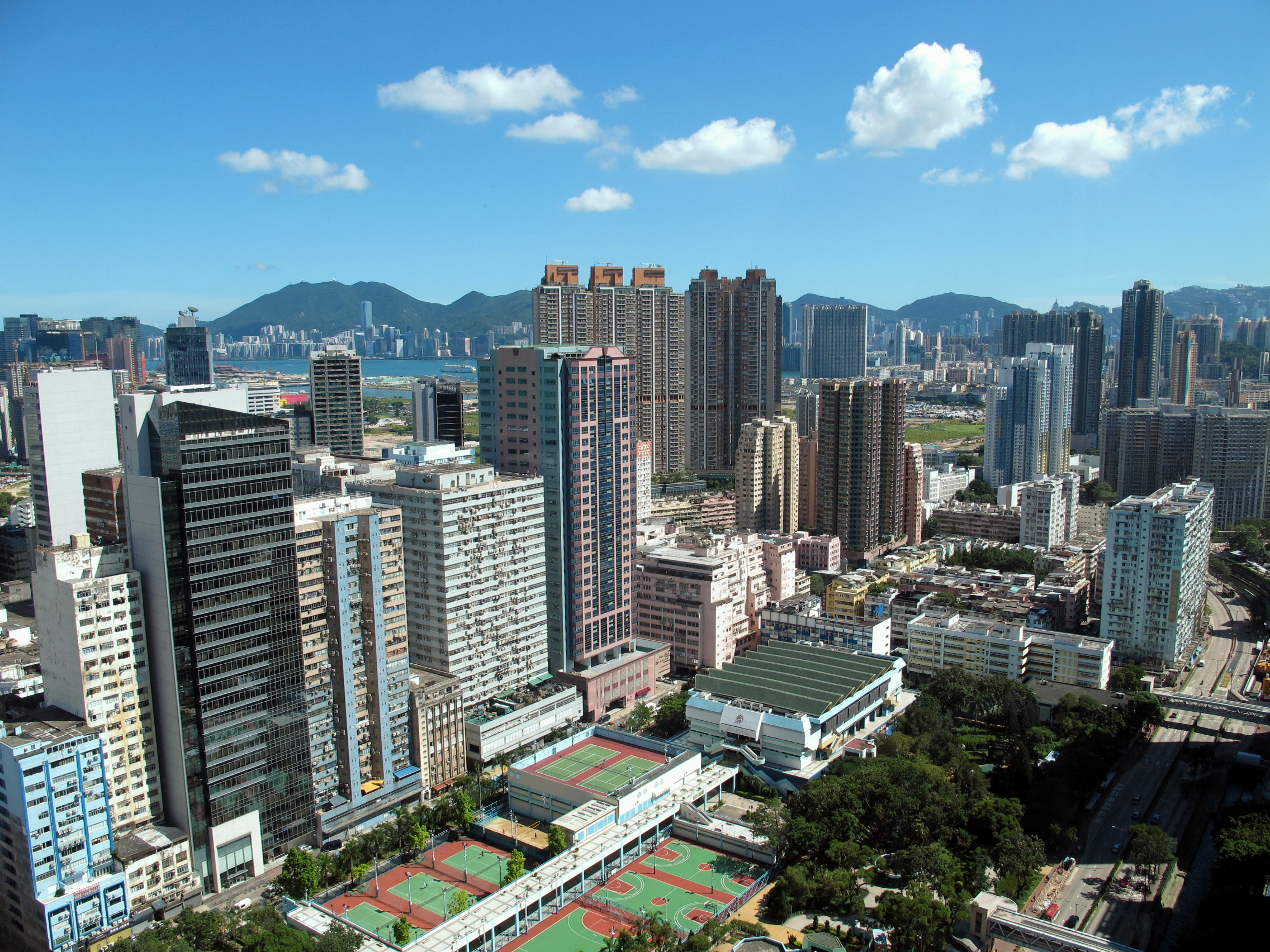
- Day view of San Po Kong in the Wong Tai Sin District

- Location of Wong Tai Sin within Hong Kong
- Coordinates: 22°20′01″N 114°11′49″E
- Country: China
- SAR: Hong Kong
- Constituencies: 25

Government
  - District Council Chairman: vacant
  - District Council Vice-Chairman: vacant
  - District Officer: William Shiu

Area
  - Total: 9.36 km^{2} (3.61 sq mi)

Population (2011)
  - Total: 420,183
  - Density: 44,900/km^{2} (116,000/sq mi)
- Time zone: UTC+8 (Hong Kong Time)
- Largest neighbourhood by population: Tsz Wan Shan (80,935 – 2016 est)
- Location of district office and district council: 138 Lung Cheung Road, Wong Tai Sin
- Website: Wong Tai Sin District Council

Wong Tai Sin District
- Traditional Chinese: 黃大仙區
- Simplified Chinese: 黄大仙区
- Cantonese Yale: Wòhng daaih sīn kēui
Transcriptions
Standard Mandarin
- Hanyu Pinyin: Huángdàxiàn qū
Wu
- Wugniu: waon^{2} da^{6} sie^{1} chiu^{1}
- IPA: Shanghainese: [ɦuɑ̃˨ da˧ ɕi˨ tɕʰy˩]
Yue: Cantonese
- Yale Romanization: Wòhng daaih sīn kēui
- Jyutping: wong^{4} daai^{6} sin^{1} keoi^{1}
- IPA: [wɔŋ˩.taj˨.sin˥ kʰɵɥ˥]

Wong Tai Sin District is one of the 18 districts of Hong Kong. It is the only landlocked district in Hong Kong. It is located in Kowloon, and is the northernmost district in Kowloon. Wong Tai Sin District is a primarily residential area, with a mix of public and private housing estates. It is most well known for the Wong Tai Sin Temple, a major cultural and religious site. The district has undergone demographic changes over the past decades, reflecting the broader trends in population aging, urban development and migration across Hong Kong.

== Geography ==
Wong Tai Sin District borders the districts of Kwun Tong to its southeast, Kowloon City to its southwest, Sai Kung to its east, and Sha Tin to its north. It covers an area of approximately 9.36 km^{2} (3.61 sq mi).

The district contains the areas of Diamond Hill, Wang Tau Hom, Lok Fu, Chuk Yuen, Wong Tai Sin, Tsz Wan Shan, Fung Wong, Ngau Chi Wan, Choi Hung and Choi Wan, an area that includes several major public housing estates.

The district is largely urbanized, with high-density residential estates interspersed with parks, schools, and cultural landmarks.

== Demographics ==
Population

As of the 2021 Hong Kong Census, Wong Tai Sin District has a total population of approximately 406,802, around 5.5% of the total Hong Kong population. This is down from the 2016 Census which found the population at 425,235, indicating a slight decline in population over the five years. The district has one of the highest proportions of older residents among Hong Kong’s 18 districts and the second highest population density.

Age Structure

The age composition of Wong Tai Sin District reflects an aging population. Based on the 2021 census, the age distribution is as follows:

- 0–14 years: 36,271 (8.9%)
- 15–24 years: 33,463 (8.2%)
- 25–34 years: 50,414 (12.4%)
- 35–44 years: 52,949 (13.0%)
- 45–54 years: 63,093 (15.5%)
- 55–64 years: 77,201(19.0%)
- 65+ years: 93,411 (23.0%)

The proportion of older adults has increased over time, consistent with Hong Kong’s overall demographic trend towards an aging population.

Gender Distribution

According to the 2021 Hong Kong Census, the district population consists of approximately 187,531 males and 219,271 females. This slight female predominance is common in urban Hong Kong districts.

Ethnicity and Language

Most residents of Wong Tai Sin District are ethnically Chinese, around 99.2%. This number is higher than the average for the rest of Hong Kong which is around 96.2%.

Cantonese is the dominant language of this region, spoken by 94.0% of the population. Other Chinese dialects and Mandarin are used by 4.3% of the population, and English or other languages are spoken by around 1.7%, lower than the national percentage of 6.1%.

These data points show that the Wong Tai Sin District of Hong Kong is not a highly diverse area, especially when compared with Hong Kong as a whole. The district is one of the least ethnically and linguistically diverse districts in the city.

Migration

Based on the 2016 census, 61.1% of Wong Tai Sin’s population was born in Hong Kong. 34.9% was born in Mainland China, Macao or Taiwan while 4.0% were born elsewhere.^{[2]} This data shows that the population of Wong Tai Sin District is made up of a combination of long-term local residents and in-migration from other regions of China with a small portion of these people being born outside of these regions.

Population Trends

Wong Tai Sin District experienced a population decline between 2016 and 2021, reflecting Hong Kong’s overall trend of low fertility and aging population. These trends suggest a shrinking working-age population and potential challenges for social services, healthcare and urban planning.

Population Data Limitations

Detailed statistics on fertility rates, mortality rates and life expectancy for this district are not publicly available. The Hong Kong Census and Statistics Department publishes this information primarily at a territory-wide or city-wide scale rather than for individual districts. As a result, analysis of population dynamics at a district level must rely on available data. Statistics indicate that Hong Kong has experienced low fertility rates, increasing life expectancy and population aging in recent decades, trends that influence the demographic profile of Wong Tai Sin District.

== Religion ==
The district derives its name from the Wong Tai Sin Temple, dedicated to Wong Tai Sin, which is located there. The district is also the location of the Chi Lin Nunnery, built in the Tang dynasty style, a popular tourist attraction.

== Education ==
Schools in Wong Tai Sin District include:

- Our Lady's Primary School (聖母小學), established in 1953
- Wong Tai Sin Catholic Primary School (黃大仙天主教小學), established in 1962.
- Bishop Walsh Primary School (華德學校), established in 1963.
- Baptist Rainbow Primary School (浸信會天虹小學), established in 1984.

Hong Kong Public Libraries operates the following libraries in the district: Fu Shan, Lok Fu, Lung Hing, Ngau Chi Wan, San Po Kong, and Tsz Wan Shan.

== Transport ==
Wong Tai Sin is served by Lung Cheung Road and the Kwun Tong line of the MTR metro system. The stations are Lok Fu, Wong Tai Sin, Diamond Hill and Choi Hung. Diamond Hill is also a station of Tuen Ma line. The old airport was located just south of this district.

== Gallery ==
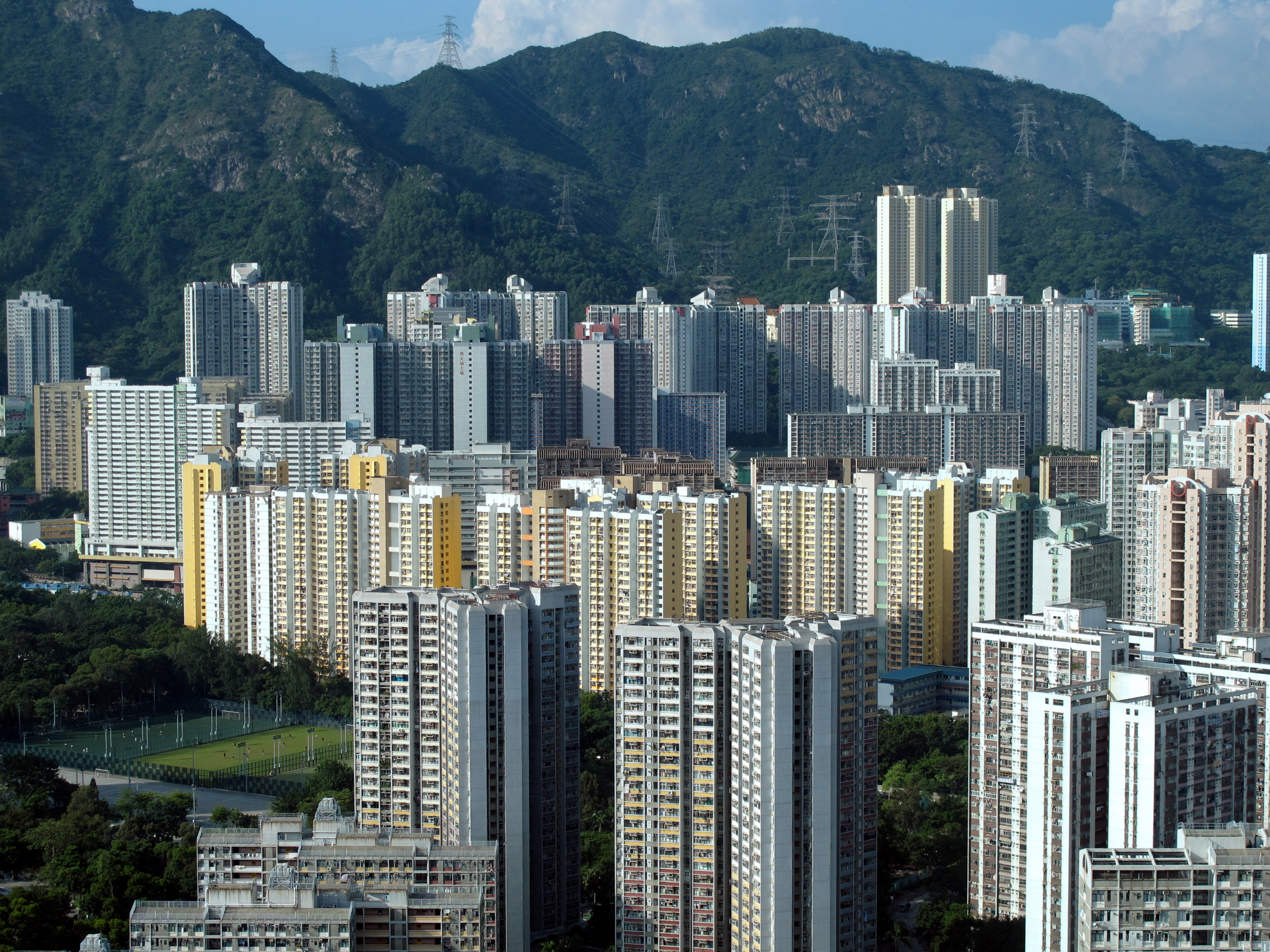
Several public housing estates located in Wong Tai Sin

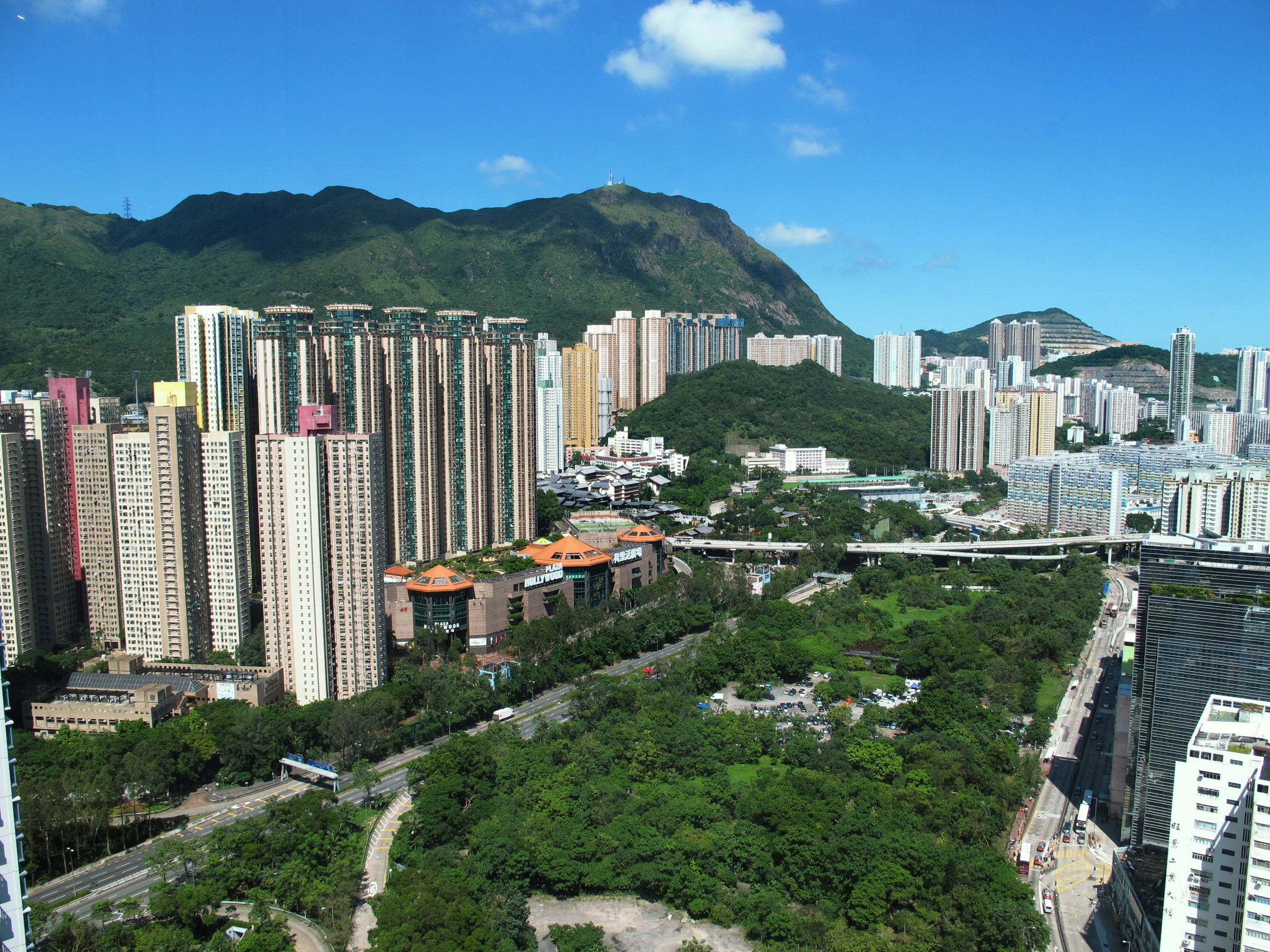
Diamond Hill

== See also ==
- List of places in Hong Kong
