= Choi Hung station =

MTR station in Kowloon, Hong Kong

Choi Hung 彩虹
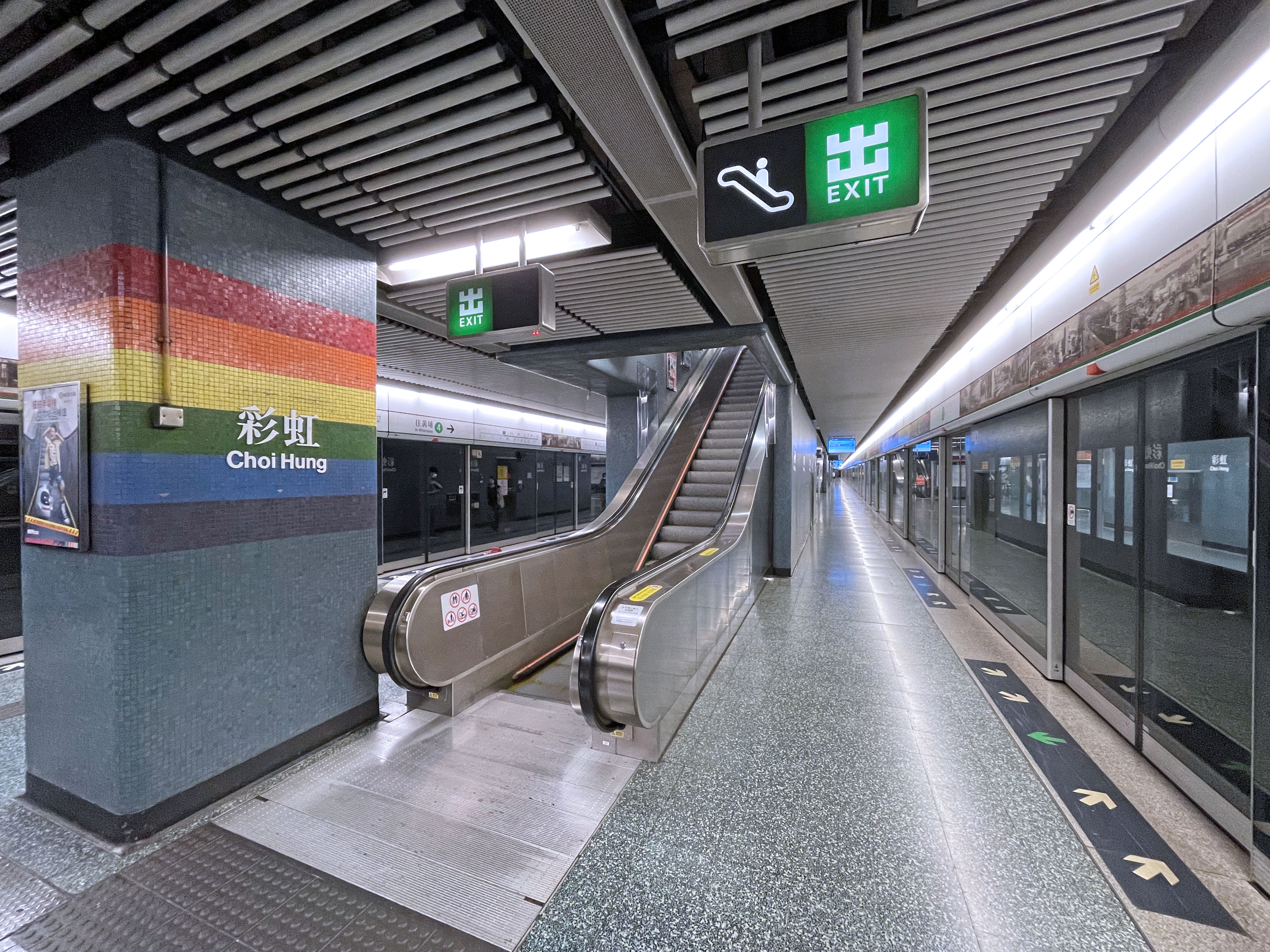
- Platforms 3 and 4 (2021)

Chinese name
- Chinese: 彩虹
- Hanyu Pinyin: Cǎihóng
- Cantonese Yale: Chóihùng
- Literal meaning: Rainbow
Transcriptions
Standard Mandarin
- Hanyu Pinyin: Cǎihóng
Yue: Cantonese
- Yale Romanization: Chóihùng
- IPA: [tsʰɔj˧˥hʊŋ˩]
- Jyutping: coi^{2} hung^{4}

General information
- Location: Near Ngau Chi Wan Village, Ngau Chi Wan; Wong Tai Sin District, Hong Kong
- Coordinates: 22.3348°N 114.2089°E
- System: MTR rapid transit station
- Owner: MTR Corporation
- Operator: MTR Corporation
- Line: Kwun Tong line
- Platforms: 4 (2 island platforms)
- Tracks: 3
- Connections: Bus, minibus

Construction
- Structure type: Underground
- Platform levels: 1
- Accessible: yes

Other information
- Station code: CHH

History
- Opened: 1 October 1979; 47 years ago
- Former names: Ngau Chi Wan

Services
Preceding station	MTR	Following station
Diamond Hill towards Whampoa	Kwun Tong line	Kowloon Bay towards Tiu Keng Leng
Diamond Hill towards Whampoa	Kwun Tong line Trains returning to depot	Terminus
Transfer at Choi Hung East (proposed)
Terminus	East Kowloon line transfer at Choi Hung East	Choi Wan towards Yau Tong East
Track layout
Location
- Location within MTR

Choi Hung (Chinese: 彩虹; Jyutping: coi^{2} hung^{4}; Cantonese Yale: Chóihùhng) is a station on the Hong Kong MTR Kwun Tong line in Ngau Chi Wan. The station is named after the nearby Choi Hung Estate, a public housing estate.

== History ==
Contract 206 for the construction of this station was awarded to Paul Y. Construction (now Paul Y. Engineering). Choi Hung station was opened when the Kwun Tong line became operational on 1 October 1979.

== Livery ==
The station's livery is deep blue with stripes of the colours of the rainbow, as Choi Hung in Cantonese means "rainbow".

== Station layout ==
Although there are four platforms at the station, only platforms 1 and 4 are fully functional. There are three tracks that run through the station, with platforms 2 and 3 sharing the middle track that is located in the middle of the station. The middle track is primarily used as a siding, and it leads to the Kowloon Bay MTR depot, located west of Kowloon Bay. Platform 2 is the termination platform for back-to-depot trains, while Platform 3 is the boarding platform for out-of-depot trains towards Whampoa.

The platform screen doors of the third track served as prototypes in 2001 when MTR started to test the feasibility of installing these doors in stations throughout its system.

Overlying Properties	-	Infinity Eight, 8 Clear Water Bay Road, carpark, transport interchange
G	Ground level	Exits, transport interchange
L1	Concourse	MTRShops, Customer Service
L1	Concourse	Hang Seng Bank, Vending machine Automatic teller machines
L2; Platforms	Platform 1	Kwun Tong line towards Tiu Keng Leng (Kowloon Bay) →
L2; Platforms	Island platform, doors will open on the left, right
L2; Platforms	Platform; 2 ↑ / 3 ↓	← Kwun Tong line terminating trains, alighting only→ ← Kwun Tong line towards Whampoa (Diamond Hill)
L2; Platforms	Island platform, doors will open on the left, right
L2; Platforms	Platform 4	← Kwun Tong line towards Whampoa (Diamond Hill)

== Entrances/exits ==
- A1: Clear Water Bay Road (westbound), bus stops
- A2: Ping Shek Estate, minibus stop, Serene Oasis
- A3: Infinity Eight, No.8 Clear Water Bay Road
- B: Ngau Chi Wan Market, Ngau Chi Wan Civic Centre, St. Joseph's Home for the Aged
- C1: Ngau Chi Wan Village, minibus to Hang Hau
- C2: Ngau Chi Wan Village, bus and minibus to Sai Kung, Hammer Hill Road Swimming Pool
- C3: Choi Hung Estate, Choi Ping Reading Centre, Hong Kong Association for the Deaf
- C4: Choi Hung Estate, bus stops on Lung Cheung Road (westbound)

== Public art ==
The Grace of Ballerinas, a collection of three bronze sculptures by the Chinese artist Yin Zhixin, has been installed on the station concourse since February 2009.

== Gallery ==
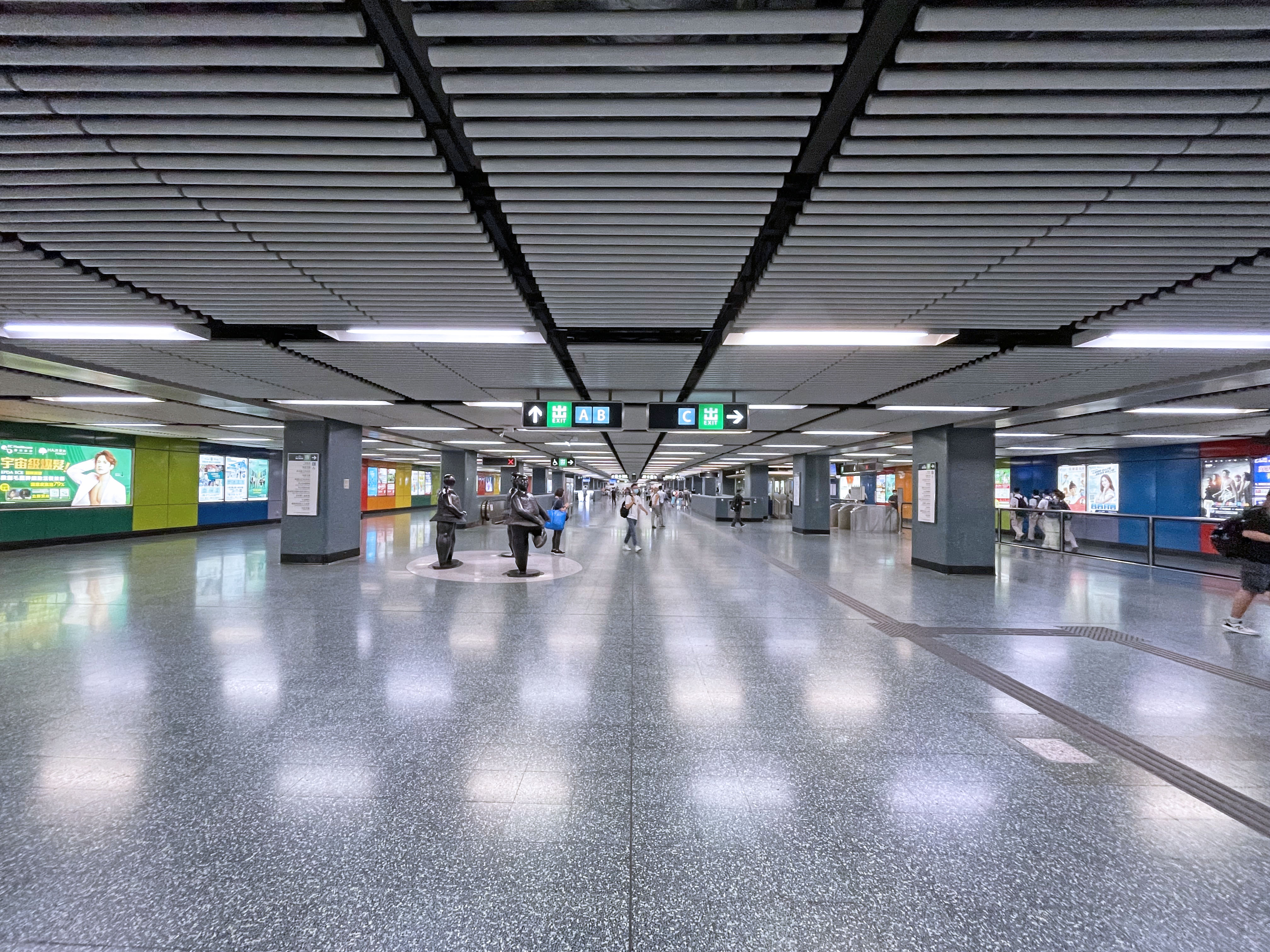
Paid area of the concourse

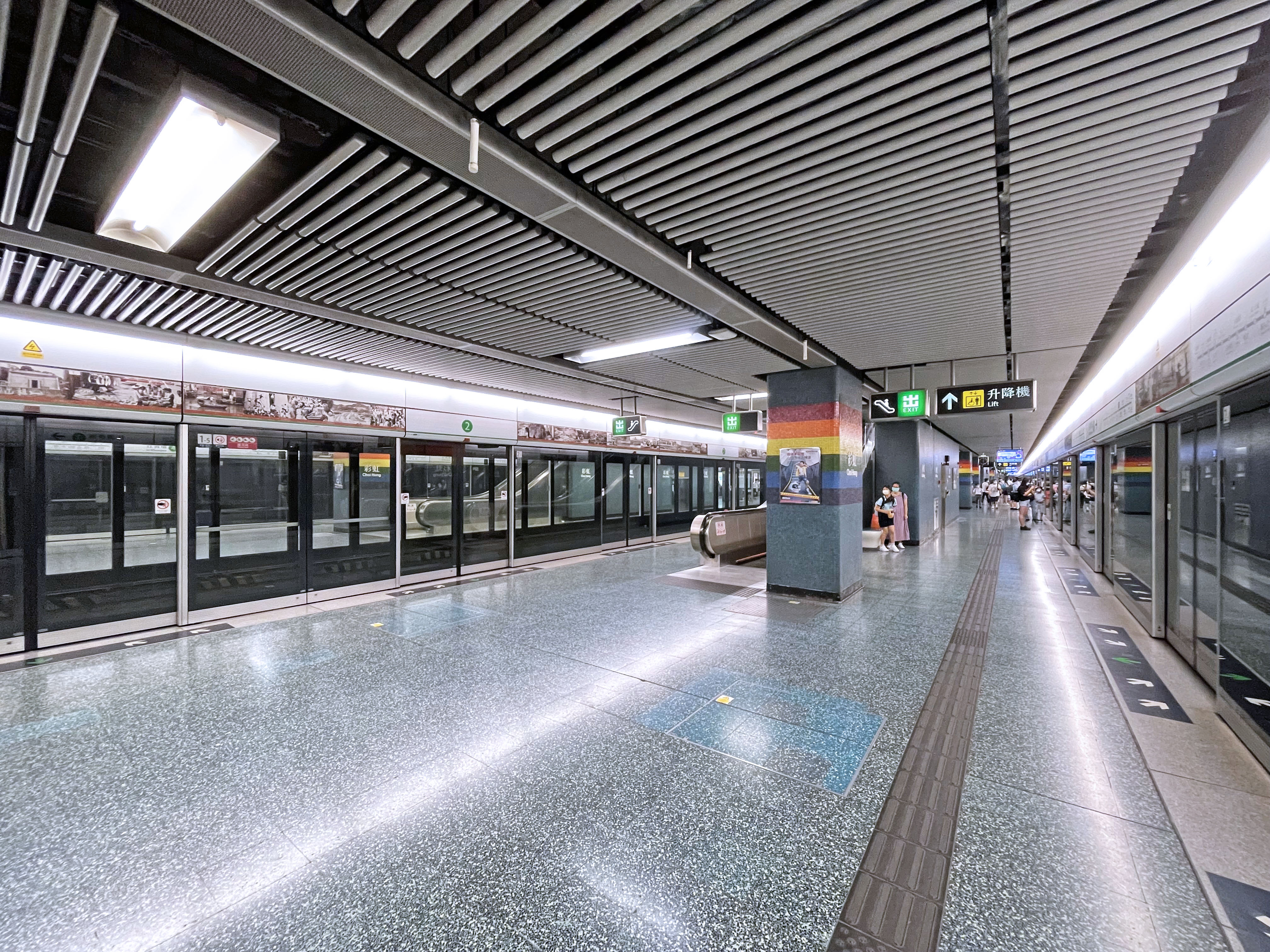
Platforms 1 and 2 (2021) with the island platform (platforms 3 and 4) on the other side of the track on the left.

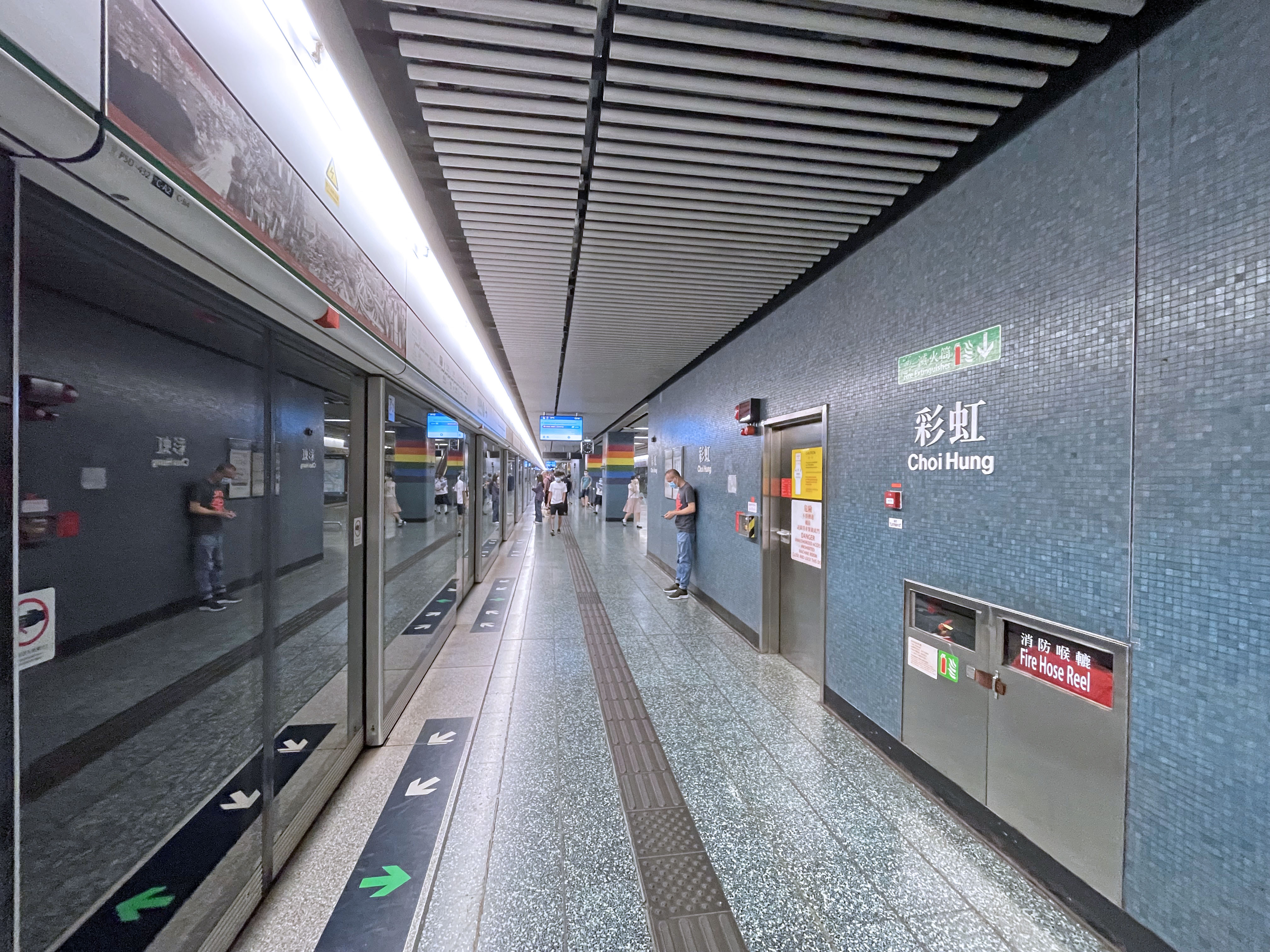
Platform 4 (2021)

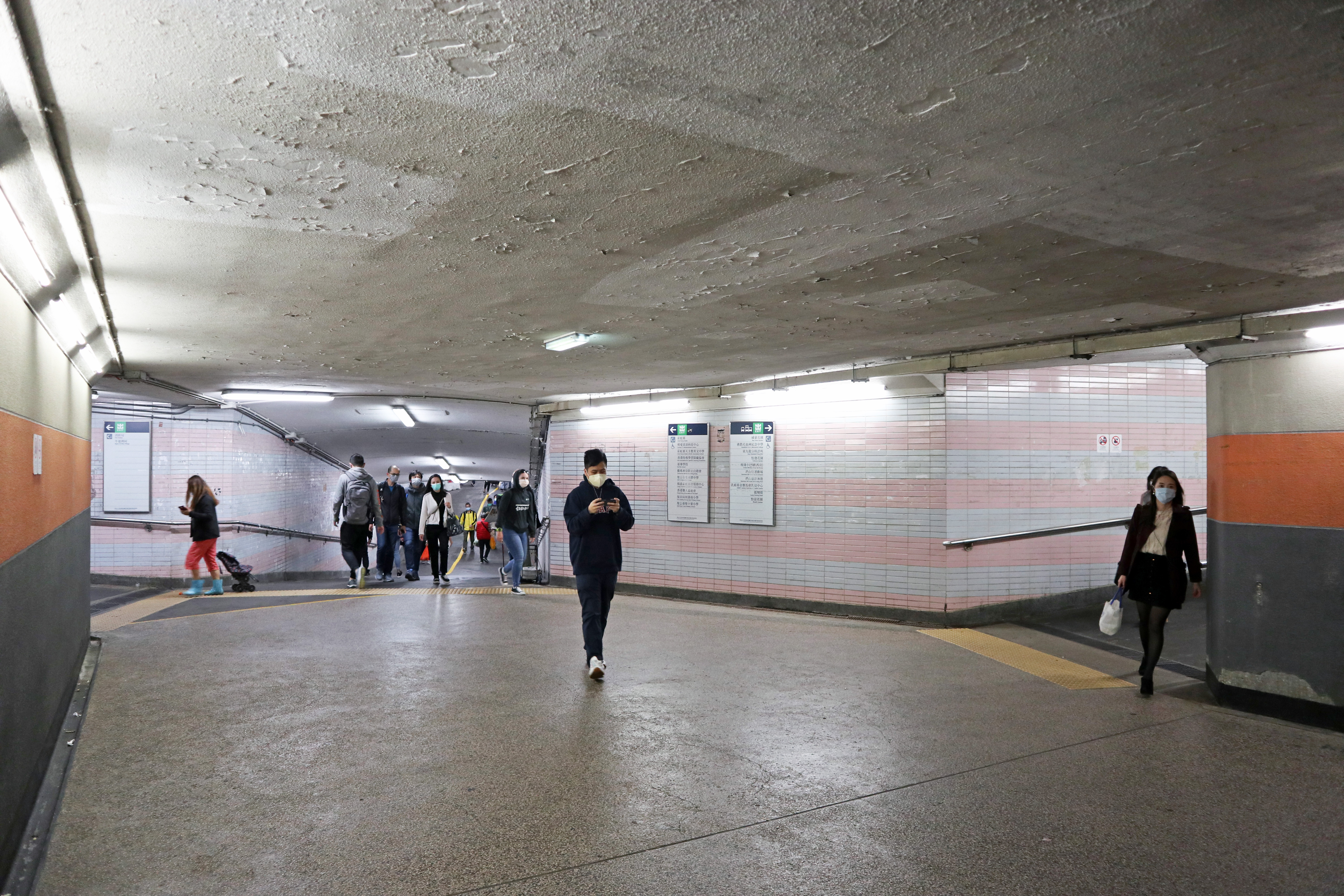
Pedestrian underpass in Exit C (2020)

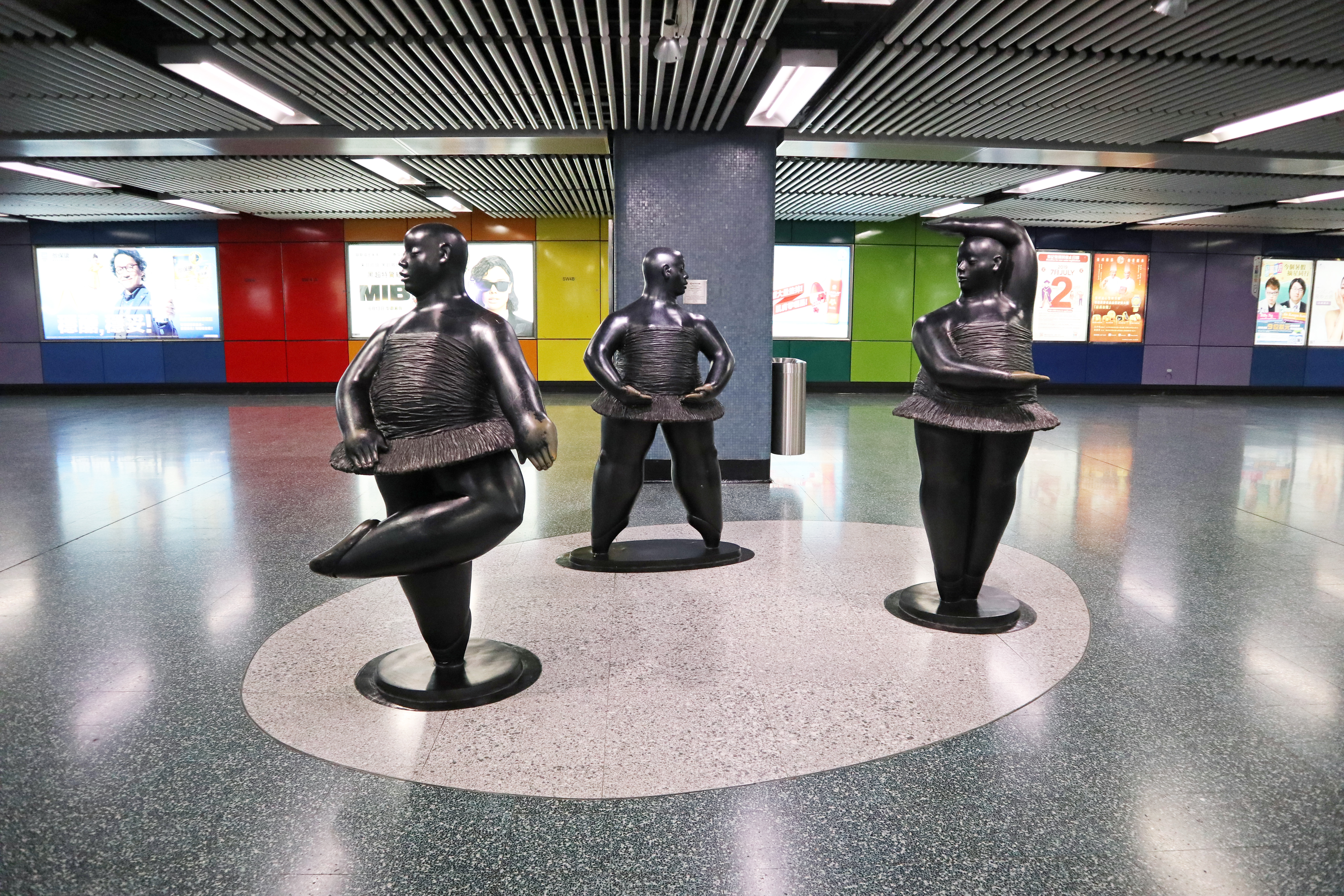
The Grace of Ballerinas

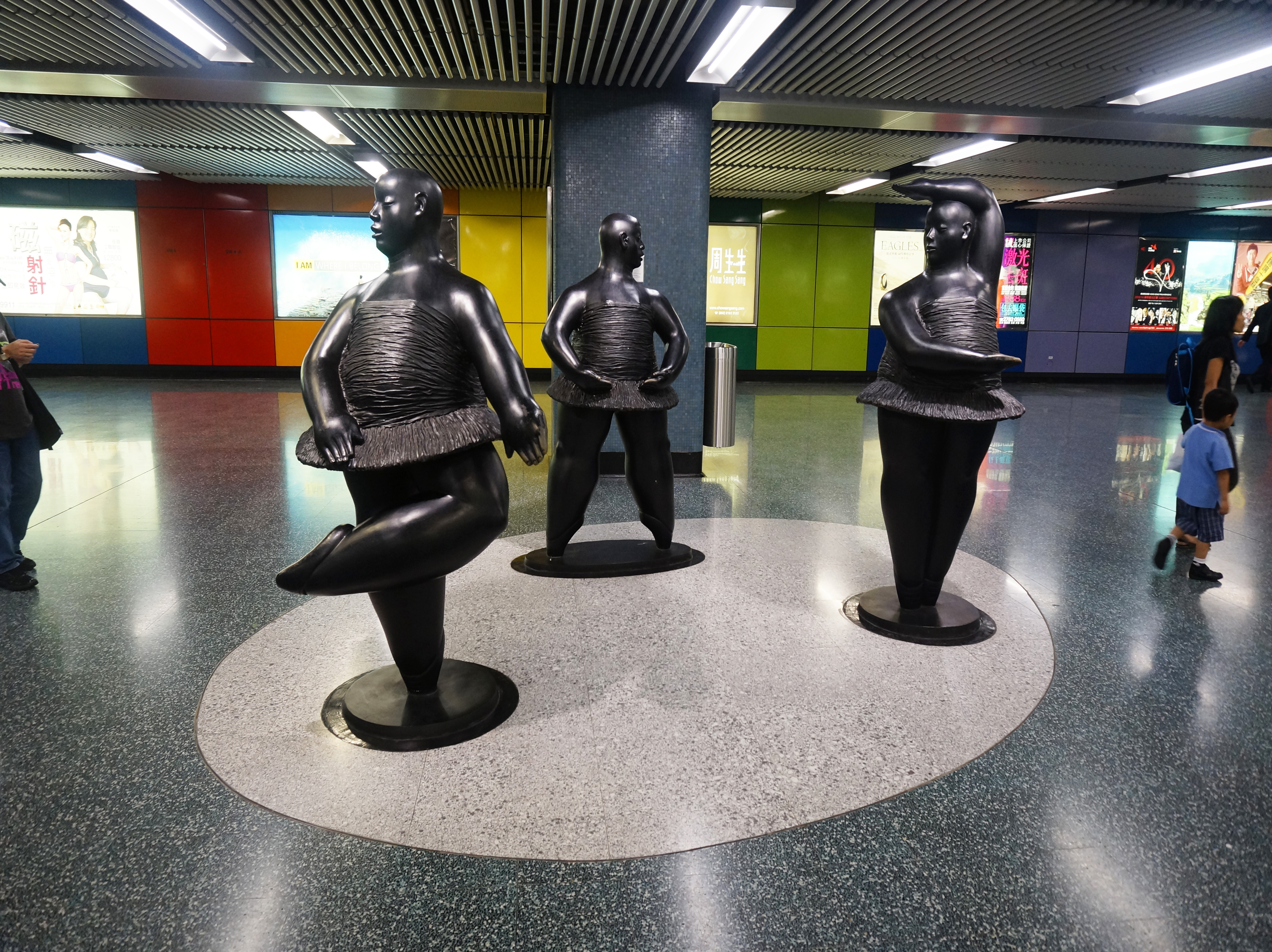
The Grace of Ballerinas on Choi Hung station concourse

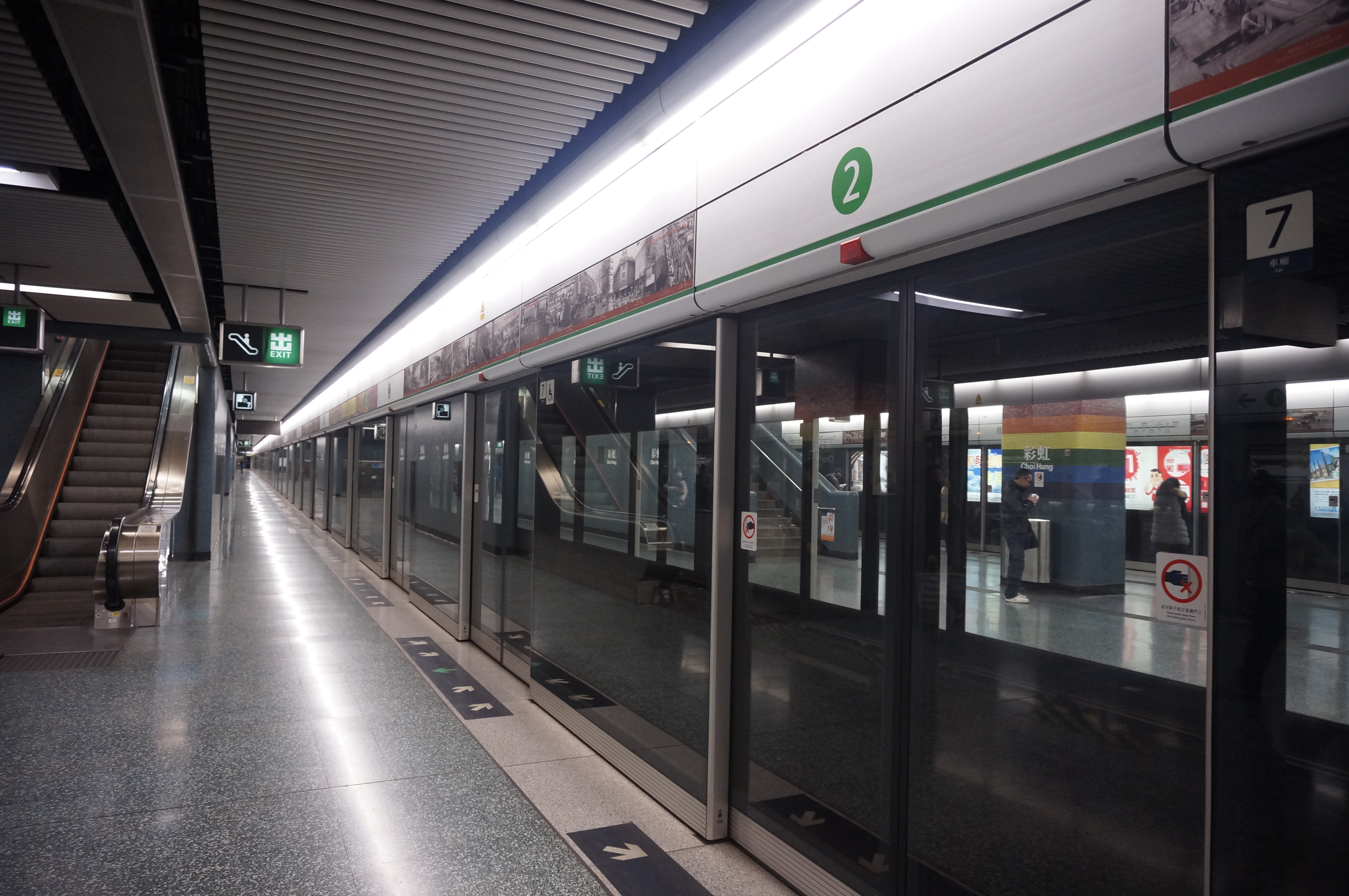
Looking through the centre platforms
