= Hammer Hill (Hong Kong) =

Peak in Hong Kong

- 斧山
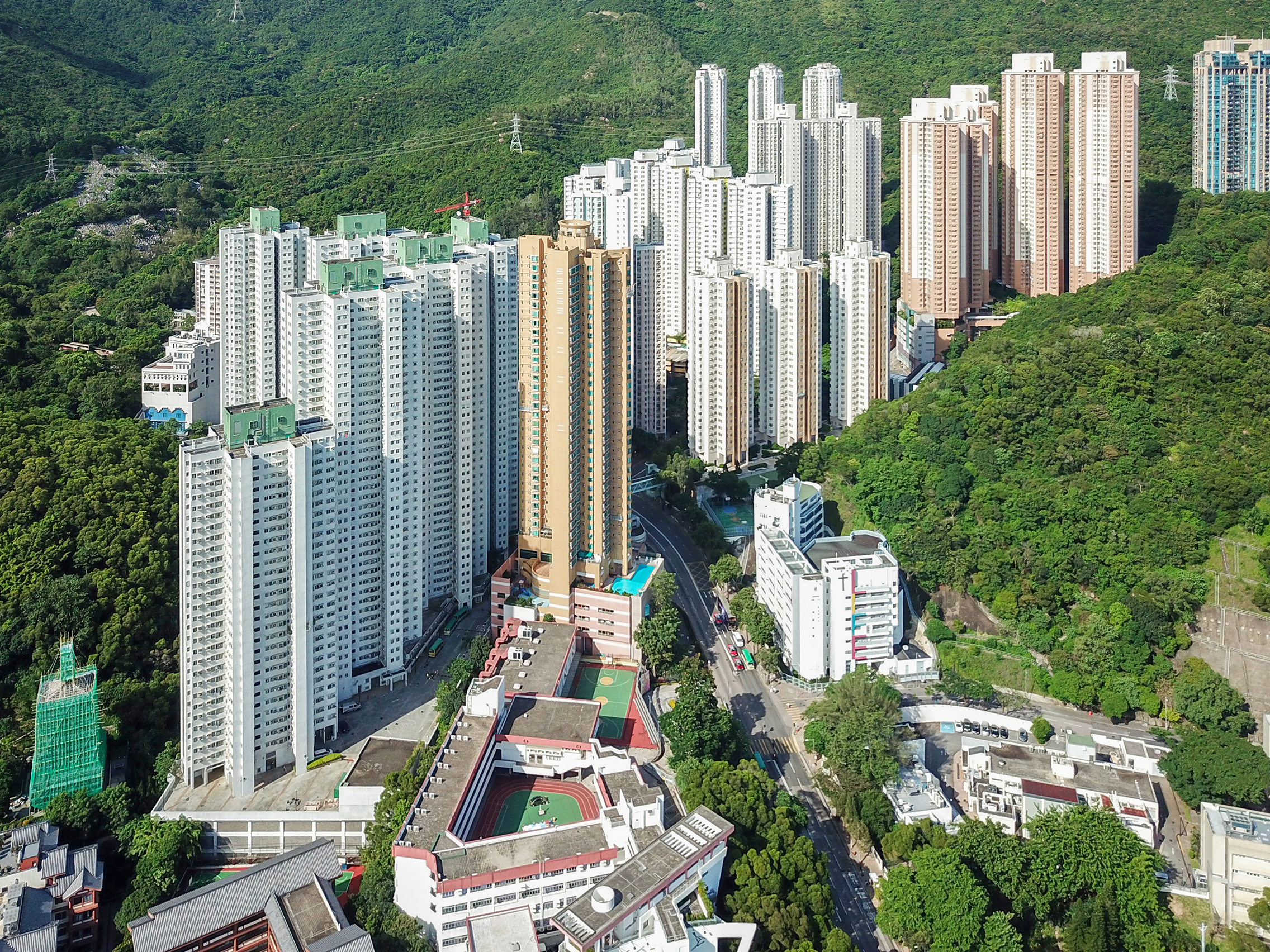
- Hammer Hill and surrounding area

Highest point
- Elevation: 140 m (460 ft)
- Coordinates: 22°20′18.67″N 114°12′41.1″E

Geography
- Location within Hong Kong
- Location: Hong Kong

Hammer Hill (Chinese: 斧山) is a 140m hill above Ngau Chi Wan in New Kowloon, Hong Kong. The Chinese name of the hill, named by the British, was mistranslated as the "Axe Hill".

== See also ==
- Geography of Hong Kong
- List of mountains, peaks and hills in Hong Kong
