= Ngau Chi Wan =

Neighborhood of Hong Kong

Coordinates: 22°20′N 114°12′E

- Traditional Chinese: 牛池灣
- Simplified Chinese: 牛池湾
- Cantonese Yale: Ngàuh chìh wāan
- Literal meaning: Cattle pond bay
Transcriptions
Standard Mandarin
- Hanyu Pinyin: Niú Chí Wān
Yue: Cantonese
- Yale Romanization: Ngàuh chìh wāan
- Jyutping: Ngau4 ci4 waan1

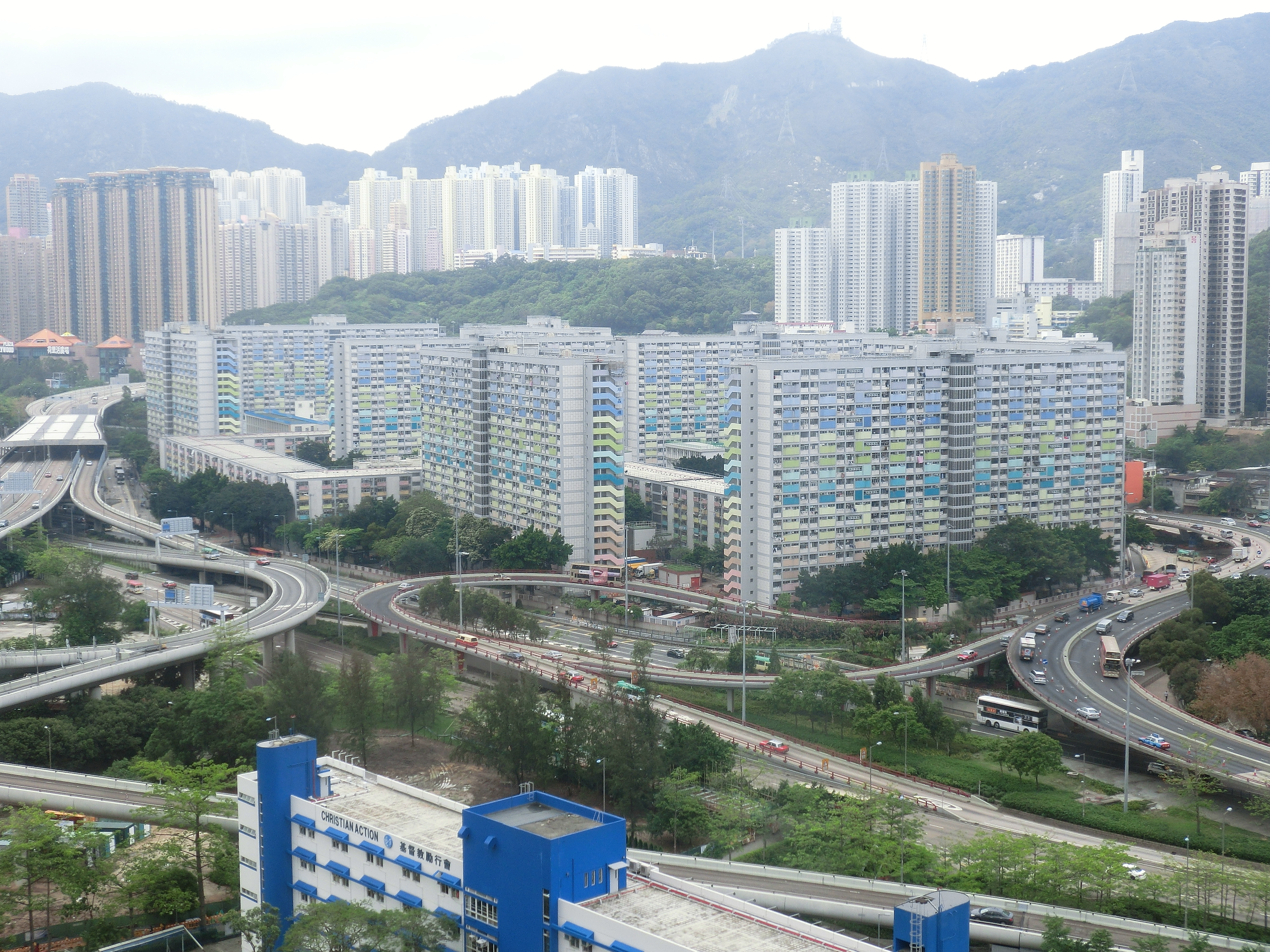
Choi Hung Estate in Ngau Chi Wan.

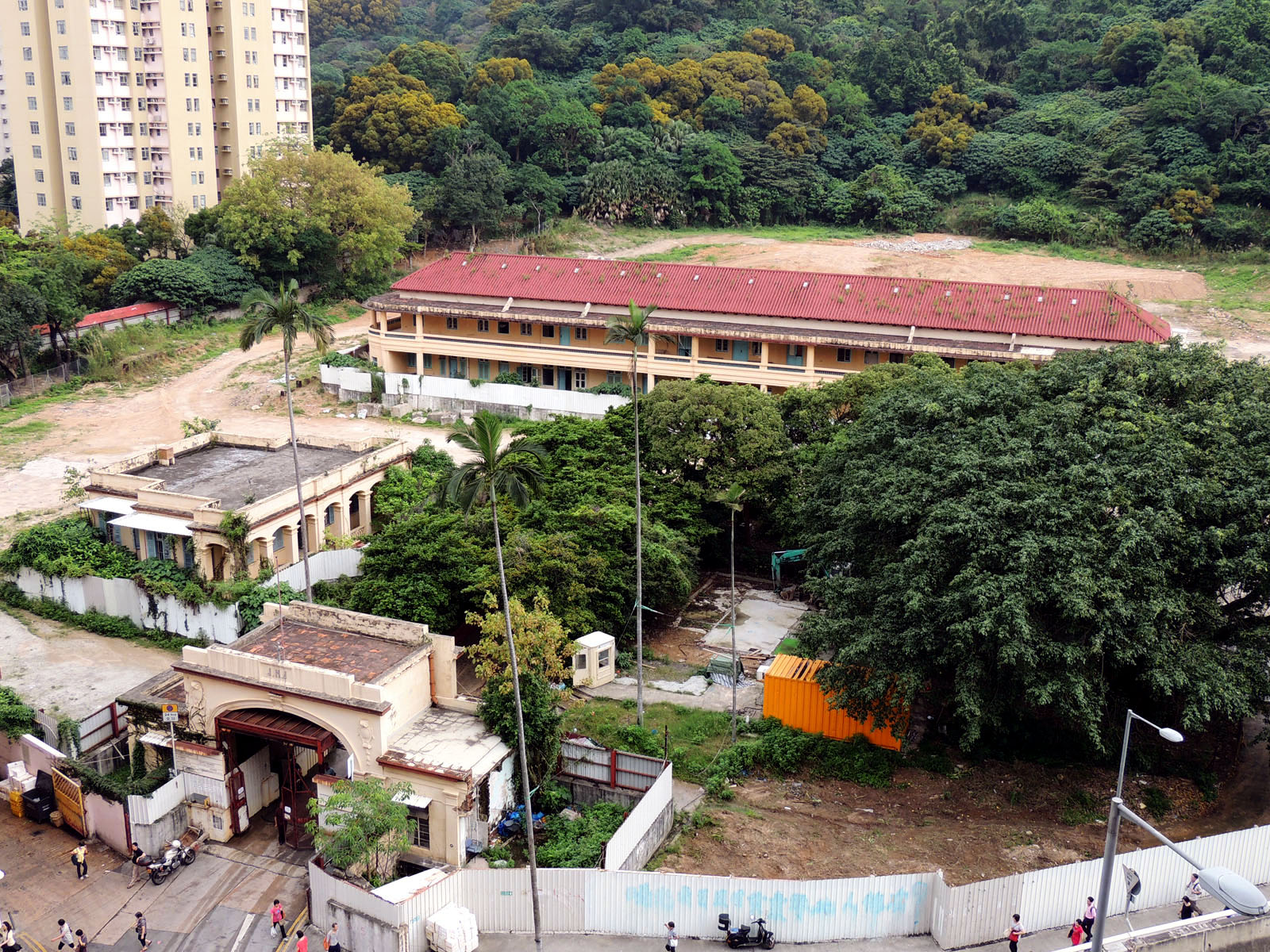
St. Joseph's Home for the Aged

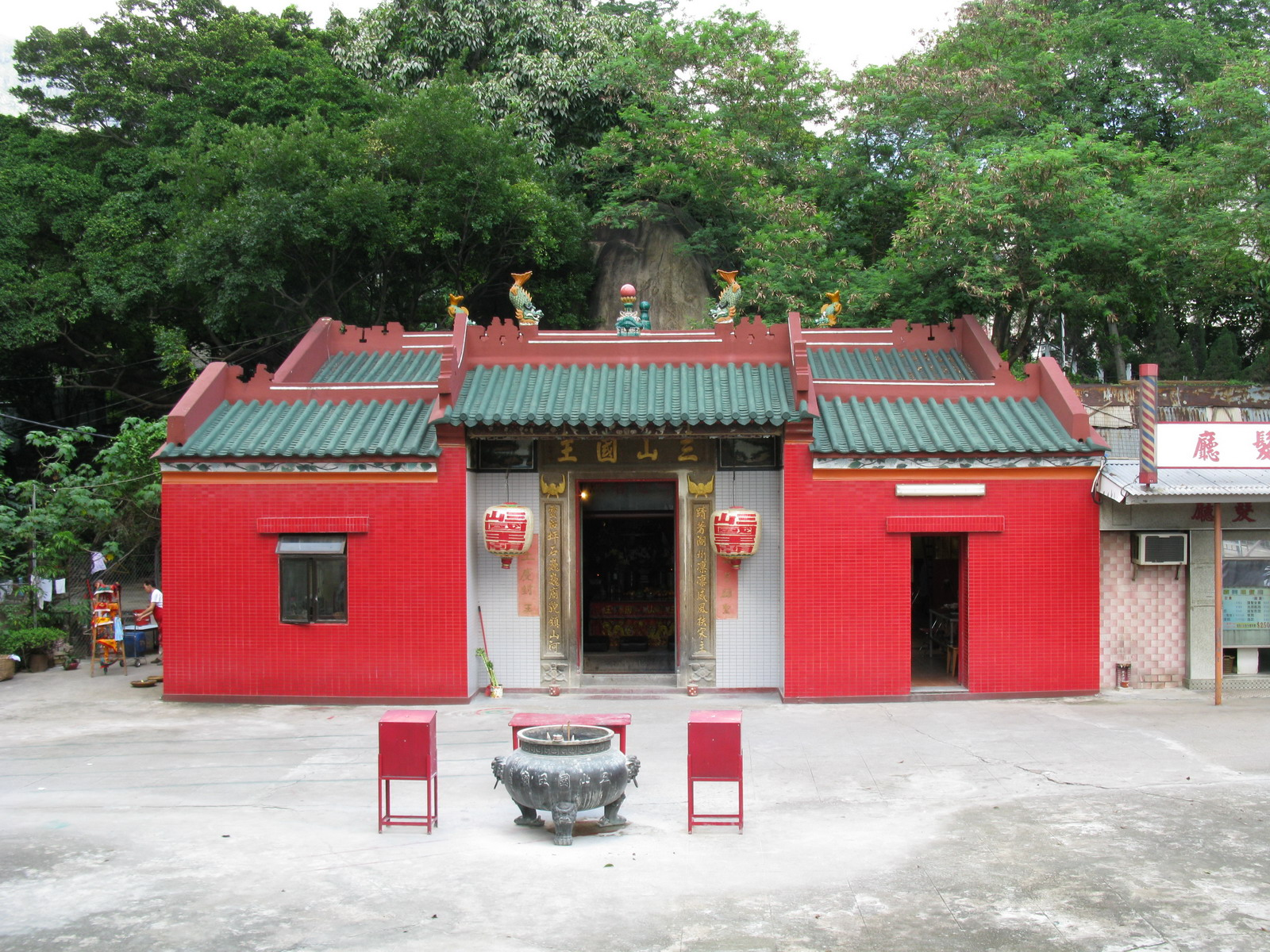
Sam Shan Kwok Wong Temple in Ngau Chi Wan, next to Ping Shek Estate.

Ngau Chi Wan (Chinese: 牛池灣) was a bay beneath Hammer Hill in New Kowloon, Hong Kong. It now refers to an area where Choi Hung Estate is situated.

== Features ==
Amidst in an urban built-up area, the original Ngau Chi Wan Village remains. St. Joseph's Home for the Aged is famous in the area and now under redevelopment. The cluster of Ngau Chi Wan Civic Centre, Ngau Chi Wan Municipal Services Building and Ngau Chi Wan Sports Centre serve the needs of neighbouring housing estates.

Sam Shan Kwok Wong Temple (三山國王廟) is located in Ngau Chi Wan, along Kwun Tong Road. "Sam Shan" refers to three famous mountains of Chaozhou in Guangdong, namely Du Shan, Ming Shan and Jin Shan. The Hakkas also worship the Lords of the Three Mountains and would build a temple in their new migrated place. The temple has been renovated for several times. At the end of the lunar year, there will also be a small flower fair at the open area outside the temple.

Ngau Chi Wan Park opened in 2011.

== Transport ==
The area is close to MTR Choi Hung station. There are also bus and minibus links, via routes to Sai Kung District and HKUST.

== Education ==
Good Hope Primary School and Kindergarten (Primary Section) is in the area. Factwire described it as "renowned" in 2021.

Hong Kong Public Libraries maintains the Ngau Chi Wan Public Library in the Ngau Chi Wan Municipal Services Building.
