= Choi Hung Estate =

Housing estate in Kowloon, Hong Kong

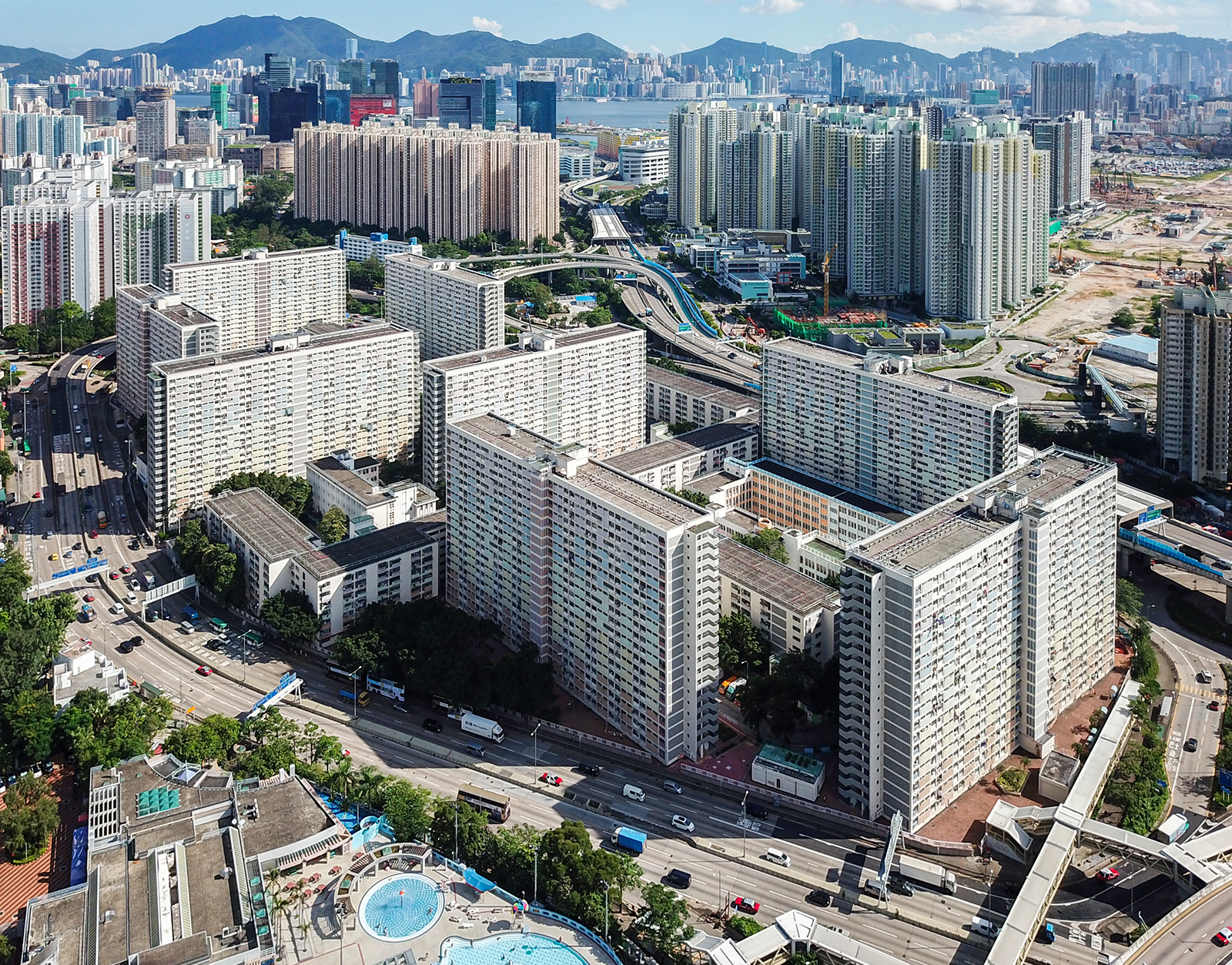
- Bird's-eye view (2018)
- Interactive map of Choi Hung Estate

General information
- Location: Ngau Chi Wan; Kowloon, Hong Kong
- Coordinates: 22°20′06″N 114°12′24″E
- Status: Completed, soon to be redeveloped
- Category: Public rental housing
- Population: 18,435 (2016)
- No. of blocks: 11
- No. of units: 7,400

Construction
- Constructed: 1962
- Authority: Hong Kong Housing Authority

Listing
- Demolished: Expected in 2028-2029

Choi Hung Estate
- Chinese: 彩虹邨
- Cantonese Yale: chói hùhng chyūn
Transcriptions
Standard Mandarin
- Hanyu Pinyin: Cǎihóng Cūn
Yue: Cantonese
- Yale Romanization: chói hùhng chyūn
- Jyutping: coi2 hung4 cyun1

Choi Hung Estate (Chinese: 彩虹邨; lit. 'rainbow estate') is a public housing estate in Ngau Chi Wan, Kowloon, Hong Kong. It was built by the former Hong Kong Housing Authority (屋宇建設委員會) and is now managed by the current Hong Kong Housing Authority. It received a Silver Medal at the 1965 Hong Kong Institute of Architects Annual Awards.

== Location ==
Choi Hung Estate is located in Ngau Chi Wan and is surrounded by several of eastern Kowloon Peninsula's major roads. To the north is Lung Cheung Road; to the south Prince Edward Road East; to the west Kwun Tong Bypass and to the east Clear Water Bay Road.

== History ==
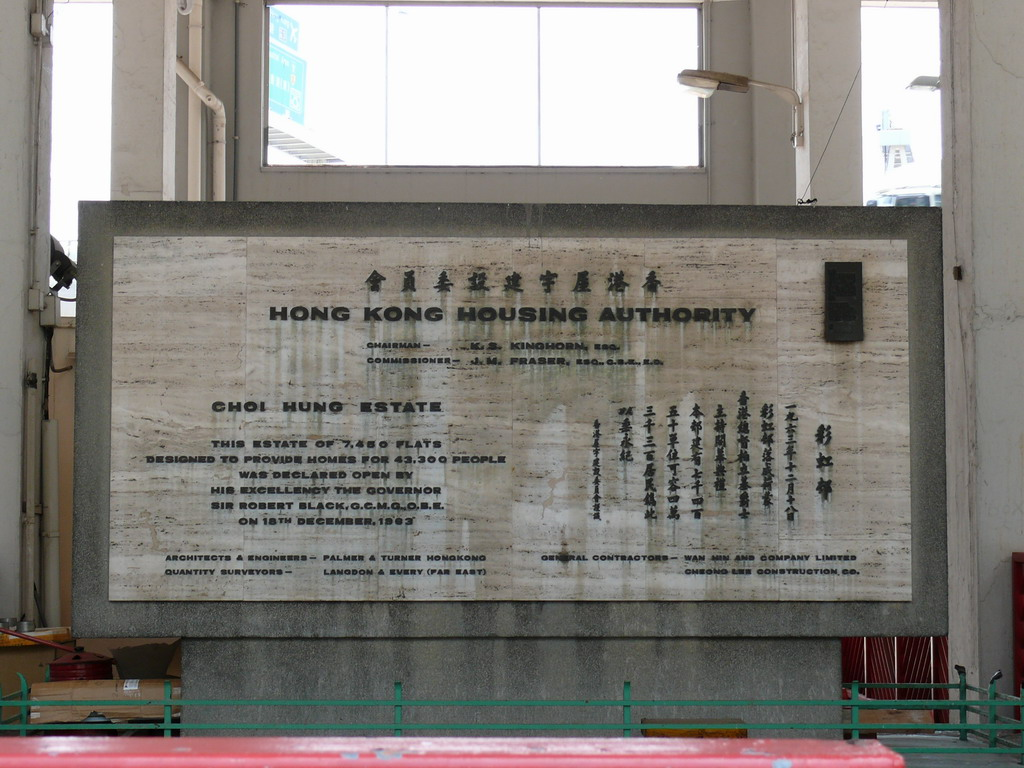
Opening ceremony plaque

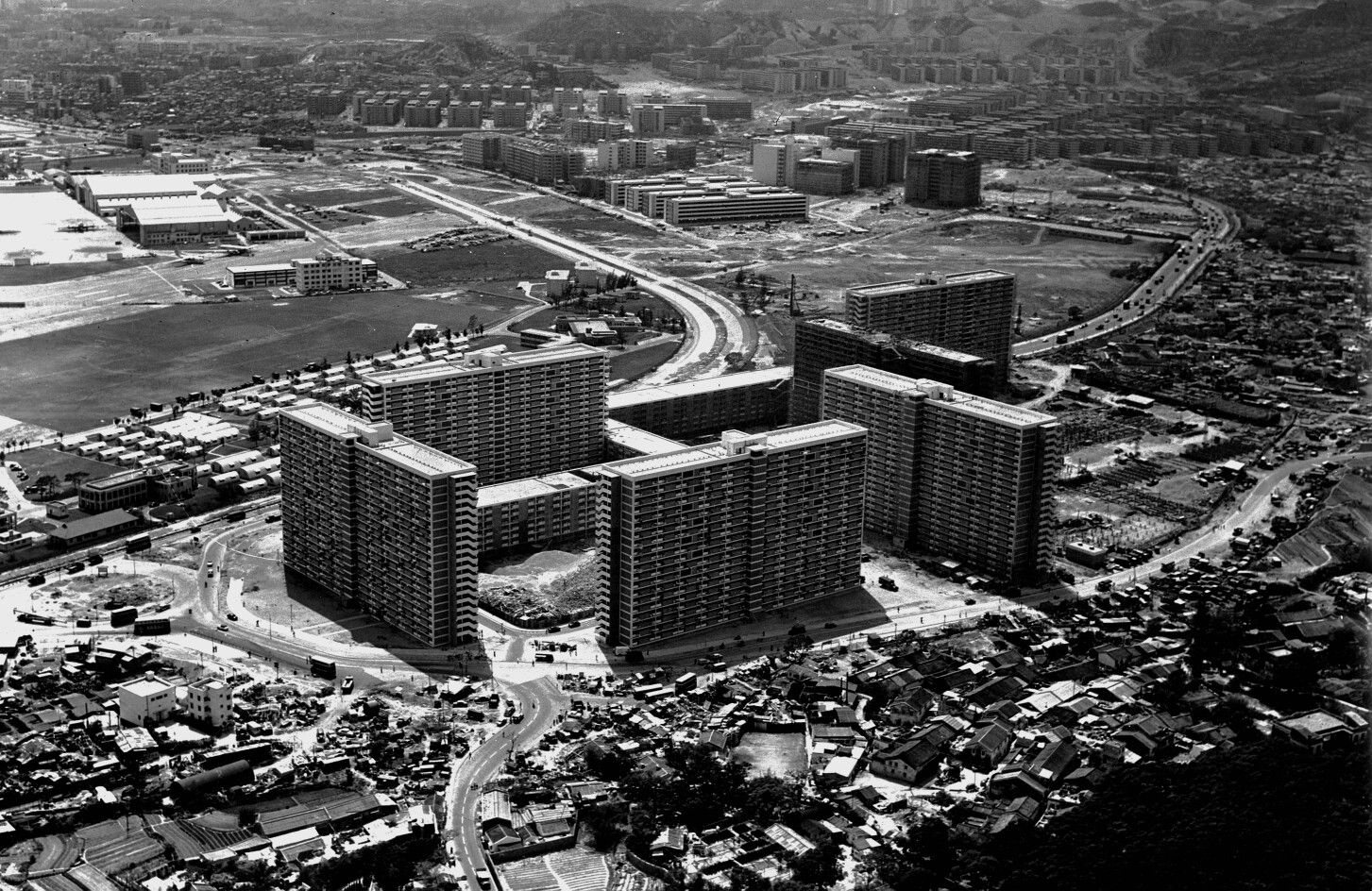
Choi Hung Estate in 1963.

The Hong Kong government granted the land to the Hong Kong Housing Authority to build a large housing estate in 1958. The blocks of the estate were completed between 1962 and 1964. An opening ceremony was held in 1963 with the presence of then Hong Kong Governor, Sir Robert Brown Black. A signboard commemorating the ceremony is located in the estate's Lam Chung Avenue.

Accommodating nearly 43,000 people, it was the largest public housing estate at the time. It subsequently attracted several prominent visitors, including Richard Nixon in 1964 (who became President of the United States in 1969), Britain's Princess Margaret in 1966, and Princess Alexandra in 1967.

In November 2023 it was reported that Choi Hung Estate was earmarked for redevelopment meaning that 43,000 residents will require rehoming.

In October 2024, the redevelopment plan was revealed in the Wong Tai Sin District Council.It was proposed to demolish Tan Fung House, Pik Hoi House, Kam Pik House, Market and two former Sheng Kung Hui primary schools buildings in between 2028 and 2029 as the first phase, residents in the three blocks will be settled to the new blocks in Mei Tung Estate. Once the first phase is expected to complete in between 2035 and 2036, the blocks will settle the residents in Pak Suet House, Hung Ngok House, Kam Wan House and Kam Wah House when the next phase begins. The final phase is expected to begin in between 2042 and 2043, the residents in the last remaining blocks (Chi Mei House, Luk Ching House, Chui King House and Kam Hon House) will be settled to the new blocks in the second phase. The number of units will be increased to 9200 once the entire redevelopment plan is completed in between 2048 and 2049.

== Buildings and facilities ==
The estate has 11 residential blocks, one car park, and five schools, with various shops and restaurants on the ground floor of each block. Roads in the estate connect the blocks to each other and to major roads.

=== Residential blocks ===
Name	Block	Type	Phase	Completed	Expected demolition year
Chi Mei House (紫薇樓)	1	Old Slab	1	1962	2042-2043
Tan Fung House (丹鳳樓)	2	Old Slab	1	1962	2028-2029
Luk Ching House (綠晶樓)	3	Old Slab	2	1963	2042-2043
Pak Suet House (白雪樓)	4	Old Slab	2	1963	2035-2036
Pik Hoi House (碧海樓)	7	Old Slab	2	1963	2028-2029
Chui King House (翠瓊樓)	5	Old Slab	3	1963	2042-2043
Kam Hon House (金漢樓)	9A	Old Slab	3	1964	2042-2043
Hung Ngok House (紅萼樓)	6	Old Slab	4	1964	2035-2036
Kam Wan House (錦雲樓)	8	Old Slab	5	1964	2035-2036
Kam Pik House (金碧樓)	9B	Old Slab	6	1964	2028-2029
Kam Wah House (金華樓)	9B	Old Slab	6	1964	2035-2036

=== Public facilities ===
- car park
- post office
- bus terminus
- 2 markets

== Demographics ==
According to the 2016 by-census, Choi Hung Estate had a population of 18,435. The median age was 48 and the majority of residents (96 per cent) were of Chinese ethnicity. Cantonese was the predominant usual spoken language (93 per cent), followed by other varieties of Chinese excluding Mandarin (4.5 per cent), non-English and non-Chinese languages (2 per cent), Mandarin (0.5 per cent), and English (0.3 per cent).

The average household comprised 2.5 persons. The median monthly household income of all households (i.e. including both economically active and inactive households) was HK$15,290.

== Photography ==
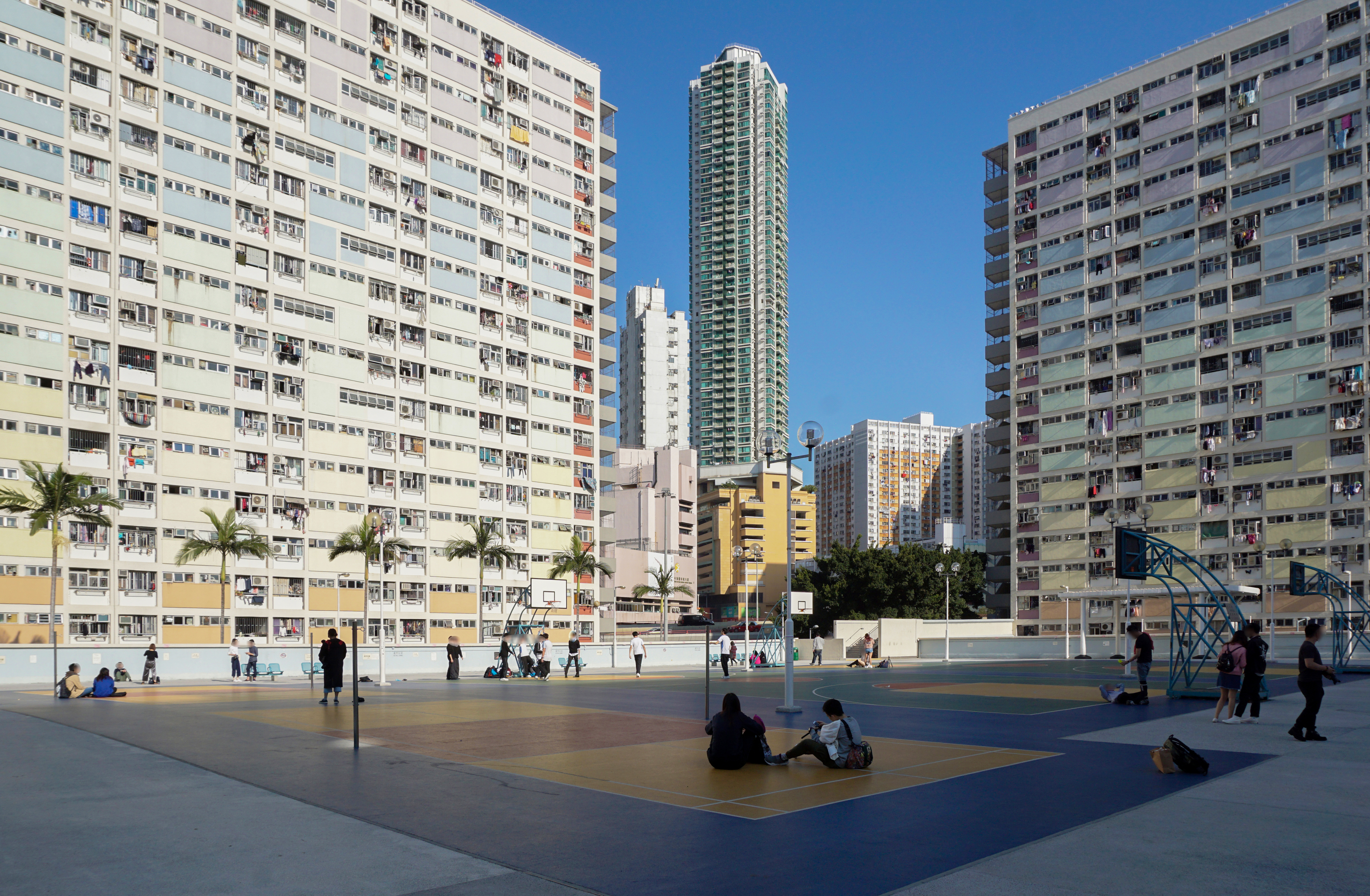
Basketball court at carpark rooftop has become a tourism hot-spot

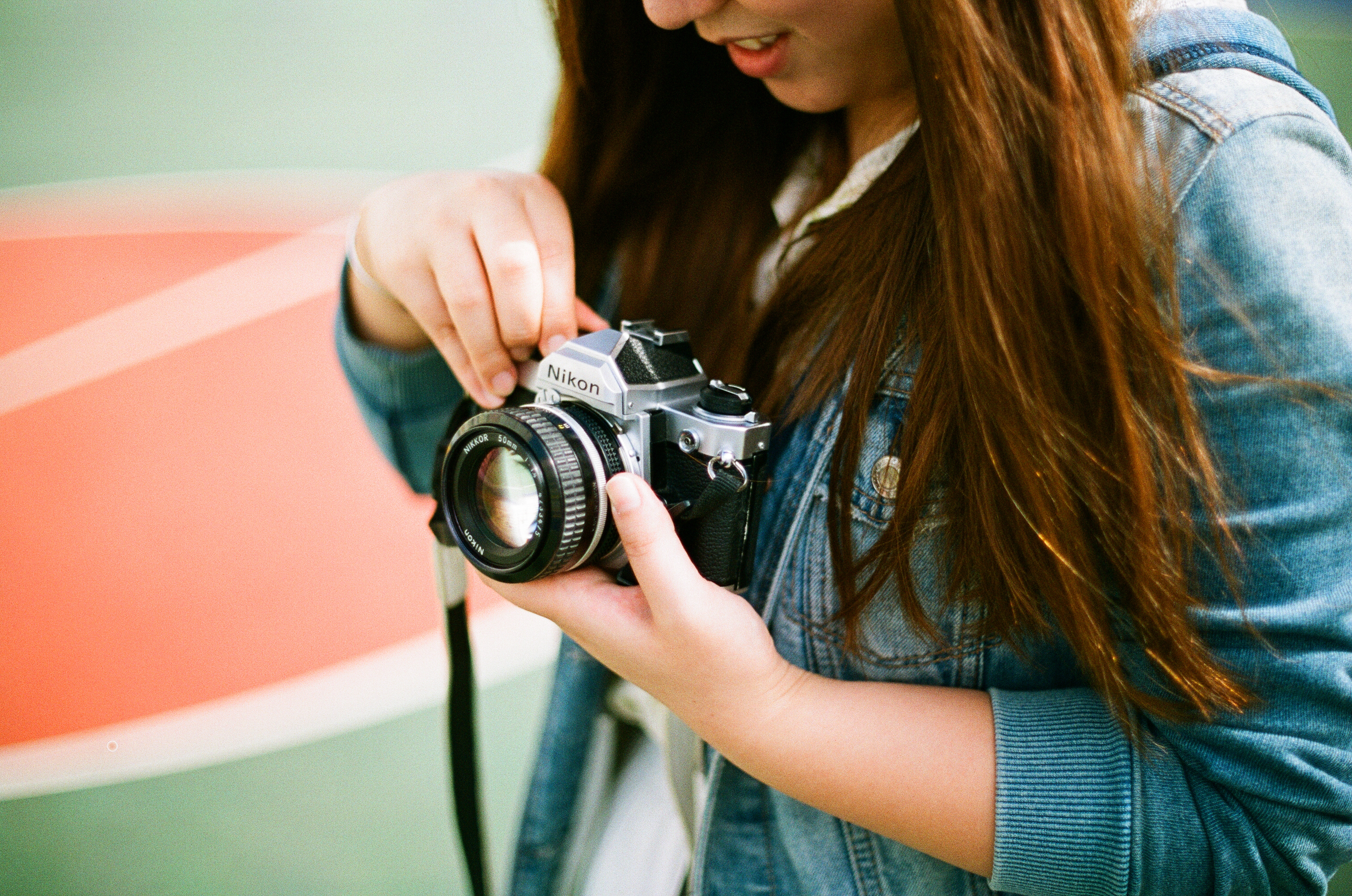
A photographer setting a vintage camera at the basketball court

The estate is photogenic and has become a tourism hot-spot. The most photographed view of the estate includes the basketball court and rainbow apartments behind. Some journalists and researchers have been vocal against the growing Instagram popularity of the area, criticising that it is a shallow view of the complex social history of the council estate in Hong Kong, as well as driving away locals who want to use the space. Though some locals have also begun selling photos for profit to tourists. It has been suggested that the location is popular not only for the aesthetics, but also because it allows the photographers and selfie-takers to feel as if they are in the middle of the world - compared to the more detached equally-aesthetic Hong Kong skyline shots. In 2017, a photograph of the building was shortlisted for the Arcaid Award, an architecture photography prize.

After featuring in a music video for Korean boyband Seventeen, the fame of the backdrop made the Hong Kong government tourist office begin heavily promoting it.

== Education ==
Choi Hung Estate is in Primary One Admission (POA) School Net 45. Within the school net are multiple aided schools (operated independently but funded with government money); no government primary schools are in this net.

=== Secondary schools ===
- Choi Hung Estate Catholic Secondary School (彩虹邨天主教中學)
- S.K.H. St. Benedict's School (聖公會聖本德中學)

=== Primary schools ===
- CCC Kei Wa Primary School (中華基督教會香港區會基華小學)
- S.K.H. Ching Shan Primary School (聖公會靜山小學) and S.K.H. Yat Sau Primary School (聖公會日修小學) (Closed in 2015, merged as S.K.H. Holy Cross Primary School)

== Transport ==
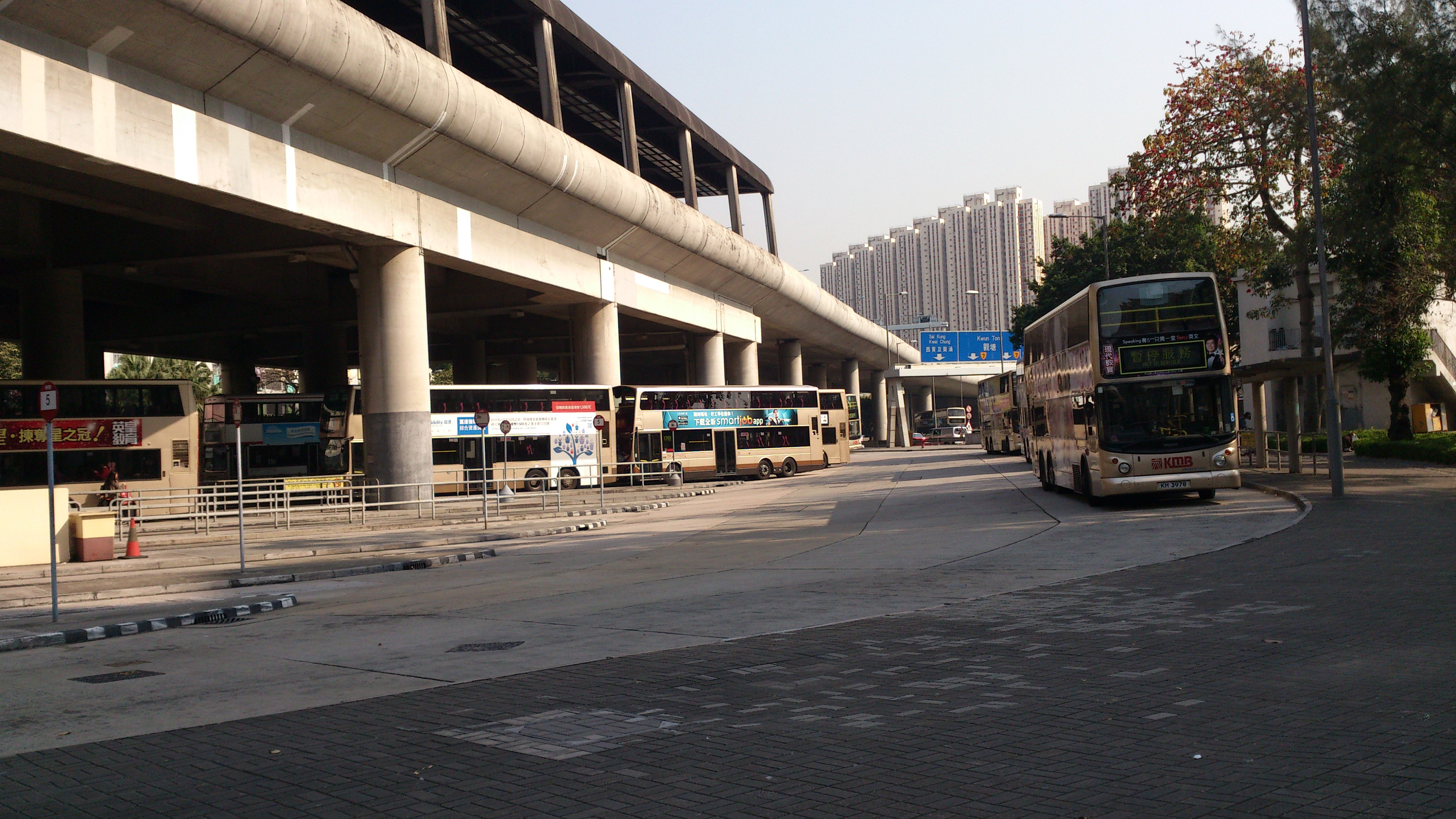
The bus terminal at Choi Hung

Because the estate is accessible from major roads of Kowloon, the bus network is very convenient.

=== MTR ===
The Choi Hung MTR station on the Kwun Tong line, which is named after the estate, is in the north of the estate. Exits C3 and C4 are available for access to the estate.

== In popular culture ==
The thumbnail of 'Love & Live' by Loona 1/3 Music Video on Youtube is Choi Hung Estate Badminton and Basketball Court.

== See also ==
- List of public housing estates in Hong Kong
- Public housing in Hong Kong
