= KMB Route 91M =

Bus route in Hong Kong

91M
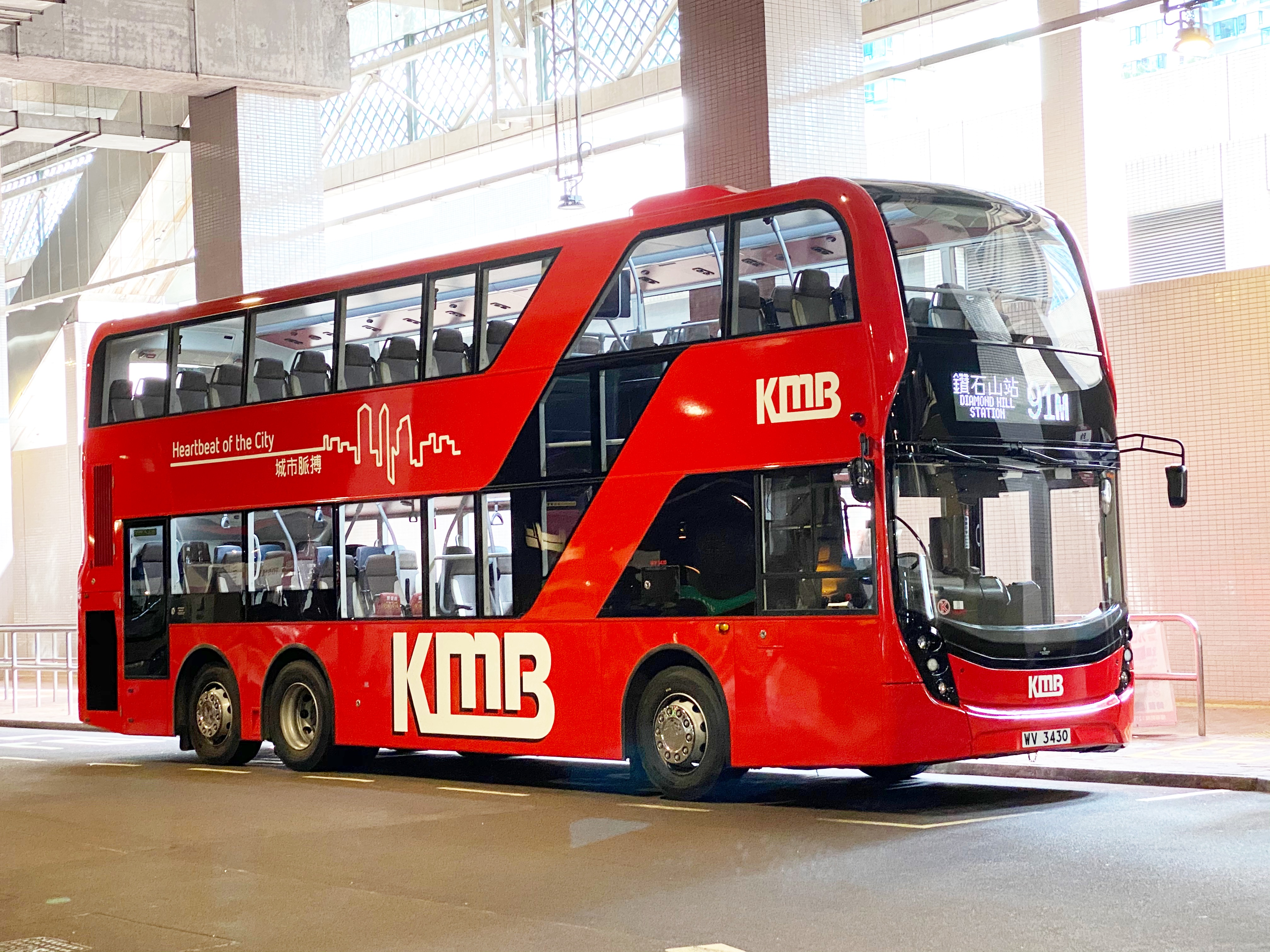
- A handful of Alexander Dennis Enviro500 MMCs were scheduled to route 91M in mid-2020s, including E6M53 (WV3430).

Overview
- Operator: Kowloon Motor Bus
- Garage: Kowloon Bay (K)
- Vehicle: Alexander Dennis Enviro500 MMC 11.3m (E6M)
- Peak vehicle requirement: 12

Route
- Start: Diamond Hill station
- Via: Choi Hung station Choi Wan Estate; Tseng Lan Shue; The Hong Kong University of Science and Technology; Hang Hau
- End: Po Lam
- Competition: NT Green Minibus routes 11 and 11M

Service
- Level: Daily

Air-Conditioned New Territories Route No. 91M is a Hong Kong bus route operated by Kowloon Motor Bus, plying between Diamond Hill station in New Kowloon and Po Lam in Tseung Kwan O, New Territories, via Clear Water Bay Road and The Hong Kong University of Science and Technology (HKUST).

To cater the demand of HKUST passengers, short-working trips by the number of 91P are provided on weekdays (except HKUST student holidays), during the morning peak from Diamond Hill to HKUST (North), and PM peak from HKUST (South) to Choi Hung station.

== History ==
Located at the eastern edge of the present-day Tseung Kwan O New Town, the district of Hang Hau was a collection of traditional villages with a market town facing Junk Bay before the 1970s. Transportation to and from Hang Hau then relied on kai-to ferries.

Route 91A, the first bus route serving Hang Hau Town, was introduced on 1 April 1976, serving between Hang Hau and Chuk Yuen (now known as Wong Tai Sin). After the city's Mass Transit Railway system commenced operation, the route was renamed 91M and truncated to Diamond Hill MTR station with effect from 16 December 1979; it was further curtailed to Choi Hung MTR station just 4 years later, on 3 November 1983. The Kowloon-side terminus of route 91M would return to Diamond Hill 14 years later, on 2 November 1997, this time to tie in with the opening of Diamond Hill Station Public Transport Interchange inside Plaza Hollywood shopping centre.

The development of Tseung Kwan O New Town (TKO) has changed route 91M a lot, as Hang Hau became part of the new town in the early 1990s. 91M was no longer the only route serving Hang Hau with the advent of the Tseung Kwan O Tunnel, which brought residents numerous new routes connecting TKO with the urban area. As the population of Hang Hau district was initially expected to dwindle during the development, KMB once proposed the withdrawal of this route in 1988 and obtained permission from the Government's Transport Department. The latter responded by inviting tenders to the operation rights of a new green minibus route running almost the same route with 91M. However, plans of cancelling route 91M was ultimately shelved, and the green minibus route (present route 11) went into operation anyway. It was eventually extended to On Ning Garden inside the newly reclaimed and -developed part of Hang Hau in 1991.

The establishment of the Hong Kong University of Science and Technology (HKUST) in 1991 also changed the prospect of route 91M. Peak-hour departures of the route started serving the newly founded university in March 1992, and by 1994, all 91M departures throughout the day would call at HKUST's bus station on University Road. The major group of passengers served by this route gradually shifted from Hang Hau inhabitants to HKUST faculty and students since then.

Route 298M, serving between Po Lam and HKUST, was cancelled with effect from 19 June 2004 due to low patronage. Route 91M was extended from Hang Hau (On Ning Garden) to Po Lam effective from the same day as a replacement.

== Vehicles ==
This route uses 11 buses.

Vehicles used in route 91M
Fleet number	License plate number of the bus	Depot
E6M27	WU6335	Kowloon Bay Depot (K)
E6M52	WV1435	Kowloon Bay Depot (K)
E6M53	WV3430	Kowloon Bay Depot (K)
E6M55	WV2856	Kowloon Bay Depot (K)
E6M56	WV3037	Kowloon Bay Depot (K)
E6M61	WV8002	Kowloon Bay Depot (K)
E6M63	WV8370	Kowloon Bay Depot (K)
ATENU116	SG4185	Kowloon Bay Depot (K)
ATENU117	SG2567	Kowloon Bay Depot (K)
ATENU120	SG4825	Kowloon Bay Depot (K)
ATENU290	ST5670	Kowloon Bay Depot (K)

There will be an extra bus from route 290 at 17:45 serving this route from The Hong Kong University of Science and Technology (the running schedule is S01).

== Route ==
The route serves the following locations:

- Diamond Hill station Bus Terminus Plaza Hollywood
- San Po Kong
- Choi Hung Estate
- Choi Hung station
- Choi Wan Estate
- Shun Lee Estate (Po Lam direction only)
- Good Hope School
- Tseng Lan Shue
- Pik Uk
- The Hong Kong University of Science and Technology
  - Po Lam bound journeys calls at North Gate of HKUST; Diamond Hill bound journeys at South Gate
- Tai Po Tsai
- Hang Hau Road
- Hau Tak Estate / Tseung Kwan O Hospital
- Hang Hau station (Nan Fung Plaza)
- King Lam Estate
- Po Lam station Metro City II

== See also ==
- List of bus routes in Hong Kong
