= Gilwell Campsite =

Scout campsite in Hong Kong

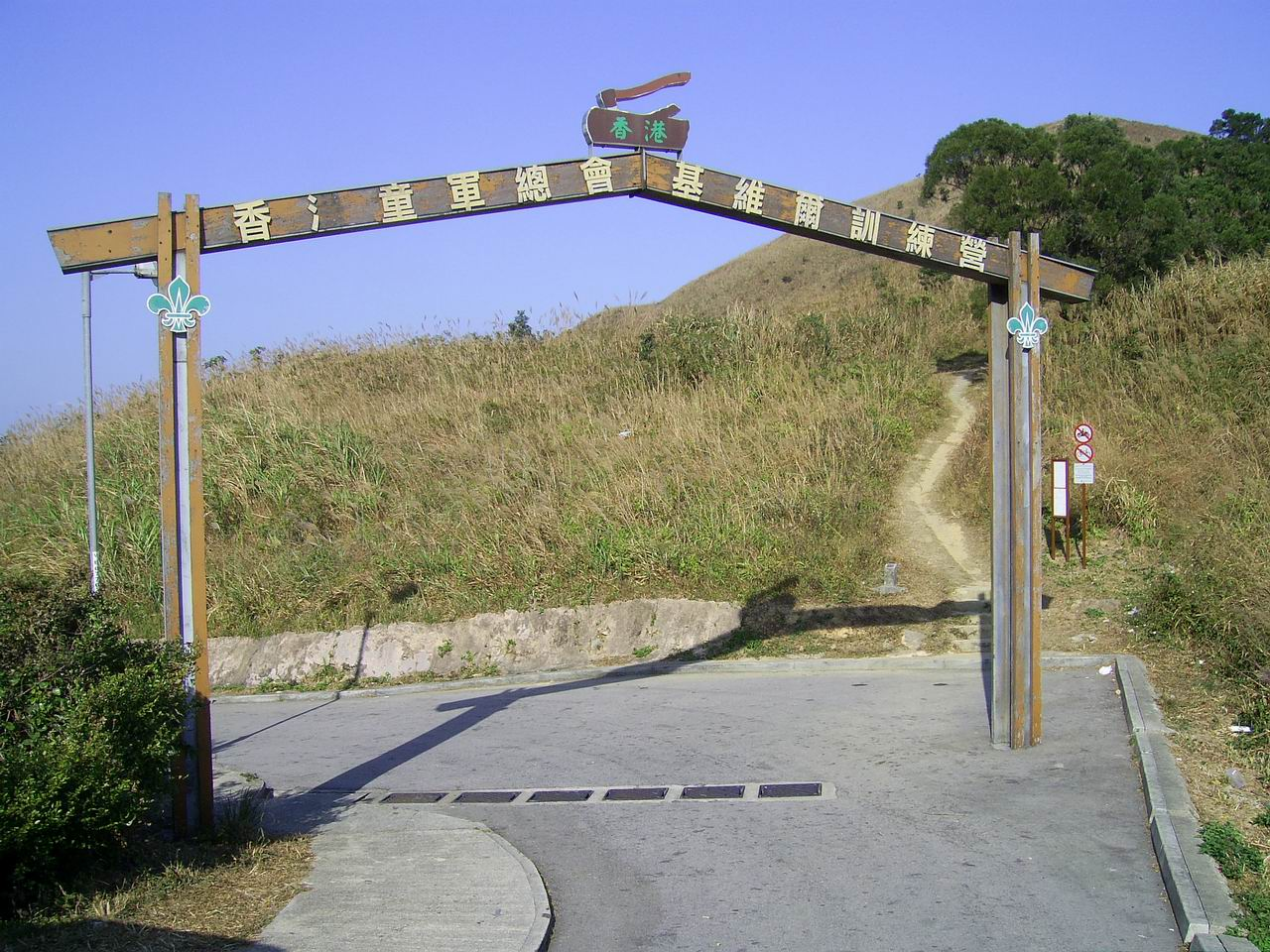
- Gilwell Campsite Archway
- Interactive map of Gilwell Campsite
- Location: Kowloon Peak (Fei Ngo Shan) area in New Kowloon, Hong Kong
- Coordinates: 22°21′37″N 114°13′19″E
- Website: www.scout.org.hk/en/venue/cac/gilwell/

Chinese name
- Traditional Chinese: 基維爾營地
- Simplified Chinese: 基维尔营地
Transcriptions
Standard Mandarin
- Hanyu Pinyin: Jīwéiěr Yíngdì
Yue: Cantonese
- Jyutping: gei1 wai4 ji5 jing4 dei6

Gilwell Campsite (Chinese: 基維爾營地) is a major campsite run by the Scout Association of Hong Kong for wild camping and other scouting activities in the Kowloon Peak (Fei Ngo Shan) area in New Kowloon, Hong Kong The campsite is near MacLehose Trail with road access through an unnamed road that joins with Fei Ngo Shan Road. Its altitude is 430 m (1,410 ft) above sea level. A few minutes walk from the site, there are viewpoints over Kowloon, the Victoria Harbour and Hong Kong Island. The campsite is managed by Kowloon Region. The campsite is located within the boundaries of Sha Tin District, very close to its borders with Wong Tai Sin District and Sai Kung District, and much closer to Tung Yeung Shan rather than the summit of Kowloon Peak, which is about 1.7 kilometres (1.1 mi) to the south.

== History ==
Before the opening of the campsite, scouts in Kowloon set up an unofficial campsite in Diamond Hill in the New Kowloon in 1940s. The campsite was proved to be too small when number of scouts increased rapidly. Another campsite of the association, Chaiwan campsite, by the transportation at that time was too far from Kowloon where is not a good choice for Scouts in Kowloon.

In 1957, the Prince of Wales Banner Competition for Venture Scout was held between Mau Tso Ngam (茂草岩) and Lo Shue Tin (老鼠田) in Sha Tin. The Scouters found a good place for camping at the south of Mau Tso Ngam, open and with water nearby. They soon recommended it to the association and the association applied for the use of land through Tai Po District Office (大埔理民府). In 1960 the land was granted by Hong Kong Government and the Gilwell campsite was established at that time. It takes three years to prepare the site for camping. Facilities for campfire and camping, and bridges were built. Typhoon Mary destroyed Golden Jubilee House in 1960. The house was rebuilt in 1968 and a ceremony was held on 23 November of the year.

The first major camping event was a jamboree held in 1967 to celebrate 60 anniversary of the World Scout Movement. The summer of 1967 is also in the midst of 1967 riots in Hong Kong. At that time, the jamboree lasted for 5 days and 4 nights, with support from Hong Kong Government and Royal Hong Kong Jockey Club, inviting all Scouts in the territory and children from children's homes. The jamboree was deemed as a support for improving social services in government policy during the period of unrest.

The camp site is named for Gilwell Park, an important Scouting camp site and international leader training place in England.

== Environment ==
At 430 metres (1,410 ft) above sea level, the land was granted by Hong Kong Government with an area of 200,000 square metres (49 acres). The campsite is located in a valley between Tung Yeung Shan (東洋山) and Tate's Cairn. Several streams runs nearby. A road from Kowloon leads from Tate's Pass in the south which continues north to Mau Tso Ngam and Fu Yung Pei (芙蓉泌).

The campsite is the only site in Hong Kong run by the Scout Association for wild camping only. Unlike other campsites managing by the Scout Association, the camp does not provide catering services. The site has only a few buildings for offices, lectures and activities.

== Transport ==
- The campsite is 45 minutes walk from the nearest bus stop of route 91, 91M, 92, 96R of Kowloon Motor Bus at Clear Water Bay Road near Anderson Road.

== See also ==
- Gilwell Park
- Larch Hill
