= Jat's Incline =

Coordinates: 22.343821°N 114.216026°E

Jat's Incline (Chinese: 扎山道; Jyutping: zaat3 saan1 dou6; pinyin: Zhāshān Dào) is a road in Wong Tai Sin District, Kowloon, Hong Kong.

== Location ==
Jat's Incline connects Clear Water Bay Road in the south to the junction of Shatin Pass Road and the western end Fei Ngo Shan Road, next to the top of Tate's Cairn in the north.

== History ==
The road was built in 1907 by the 119th Infantry (later renamed the 2nd Battalion of the 9th Jat Regiment, abbreviated to “2/9 Jat Regt”) and repaired in 1932 by the 3rd Battalion of the 9th Jat Regiment (abbreviated to “3/9 Jat Regt”).

== See also ==
- Good Hope School
