= Ta Ku Ling =

Area in Hong Kong

Coordinates: 22.3453°N 114.2545°E

Ta Ku Ling (Chinese: 打鼓嶺) is an area in the New Territories, Hong Kong, at the junction of Hiram's Highway and Clear Water Bay Road. Northeast of Razor Hill and south of a hill of same name, the area administratively belongs to Sai Kung District.

Ta Ku Ling Village and Ta Ku Ling New Village (打鼓嶺新村, Ta Ku Ling San Tsuen) are both located in this area.
