= Tung Yeung Shan =

Mountain in Hong Kong

Tung Yeung Shan, Hong Kong
- 東洋山
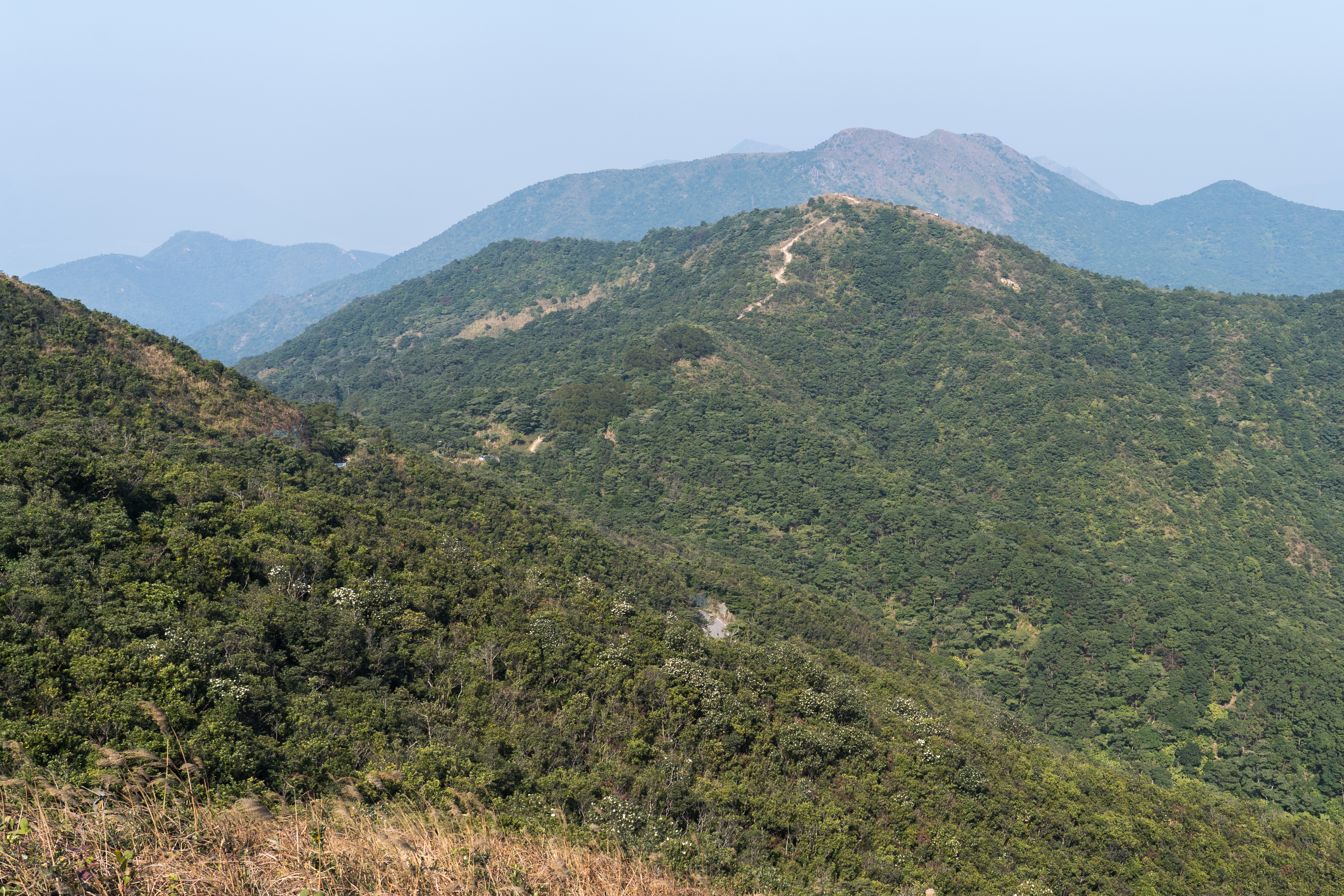

Highest point
- Elevation: 533 m (1,749 ft)
- Coordinates: 22°21′31″N 114°13′28″E

Geography
- Location within Hong Kong
- Location: Hong Kong

Tung Yeung Shan (Chinese: 東洋山; lit. 'East Ocean Mountain') is a mountain in Hong Kong at 533 metres (1,749 ft) in height. It is close to Tate's Cairn, one of the peaks of the Kowloon Ridge.

Stage 4 of the Wilson Trail passes over the mountain, while stage 4 of MacLehose Trail passes just below the summit of this peak to the north.

== See also ==
- Fei Ngo Shan Road
- Eight Mountains of Kowloon
