= Cheung Shan (Kowloon) =

Mountain in Hong Kong

Cheung Shan / Middle Hill
- 象山
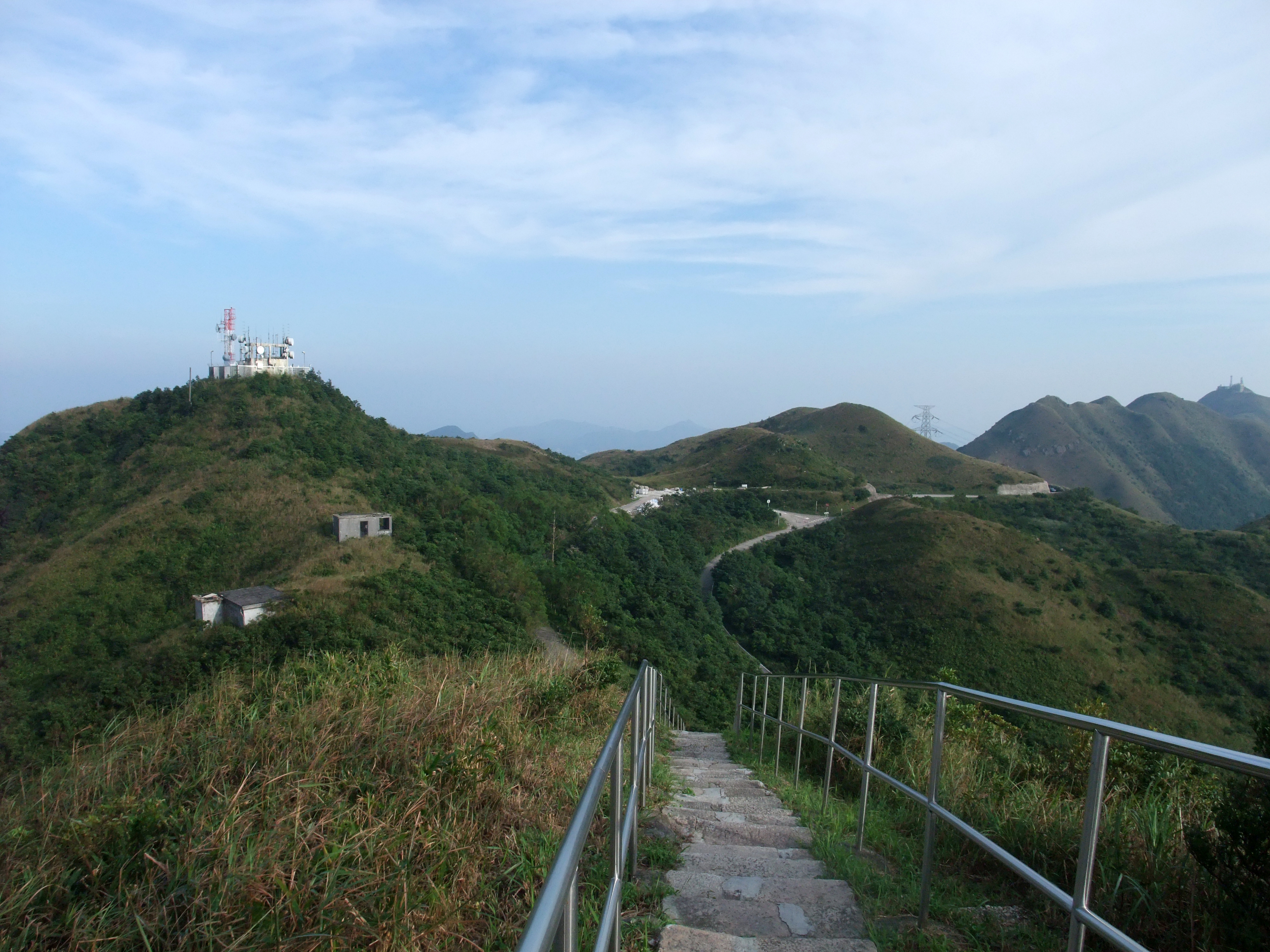
- Cheung Shan is on the right. A subpeak of Tate's Cairn is on the left.

Highest point
- Elevation: 585 m (1,919 ft)
- Coordinates: 22°21′28.78″N 114°13′5.85″E

Geography
- Location within Hong Kong
- Location: Hong Kong

Cheung Shan
- Chinese: 象山
- Literal meaning: Elephant Mountain
Transcriptions
Standard Mandarin
- Hanyu Pinyin: Xiàngshān
Yue: Cantonese
- Jyutping: zoeng6 saan1

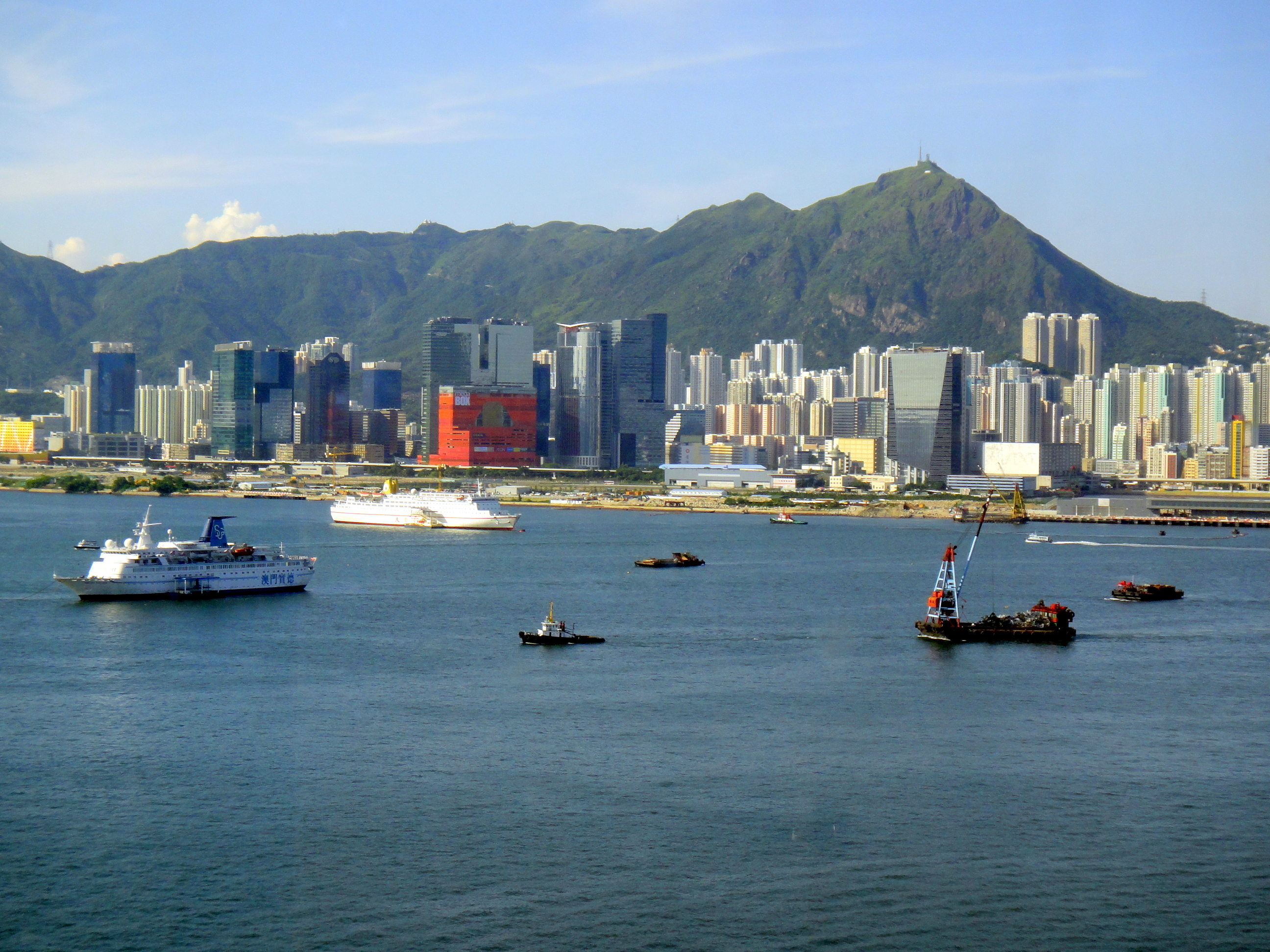
Tate's Cairn, Middle Hill and Kowloon Peak viewed from the Hong Kong Island.

Middle Hill, also known as Cheung Shan (Chinese: 象山; lit. 'Elephant Mountain'), is a mountain in Hong Kong at 585 metres (1,919 ft) in height. Located to the north of Kowloon Peak (Fei Ngo Shan) and to the south of Tung Shan, it falls within the Ma On Shan Country Park and straddles the border between Wong Tai Sin and Sai Kung districts.

== Landscape ==
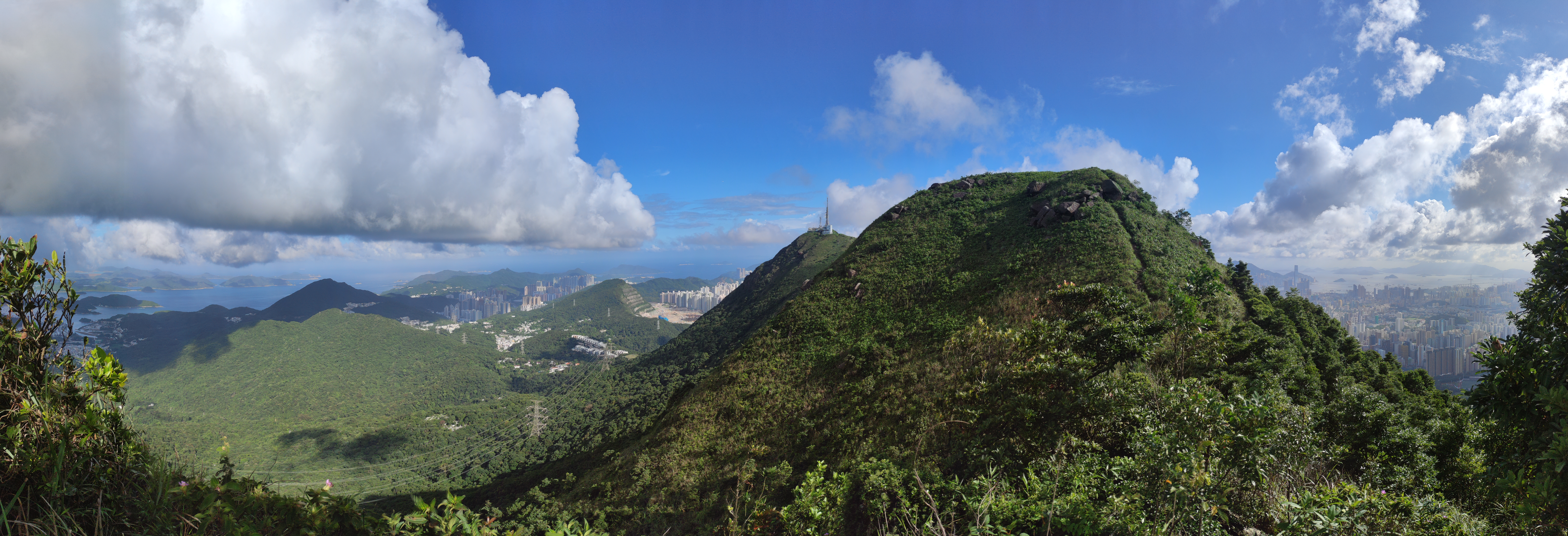
Cheung Shan (Elephant Mountain) viewed from the north. Behind it is Fei Ngo Shan, the highest peak in Kowloon.

== See also ==
- Fei Ngo Shan Road
- List of mountains, peaks and hills in Hong Kong
- Tate's Cairn
