= Razor Hill =

Hill in Hong Kong

- 鷓鴣山
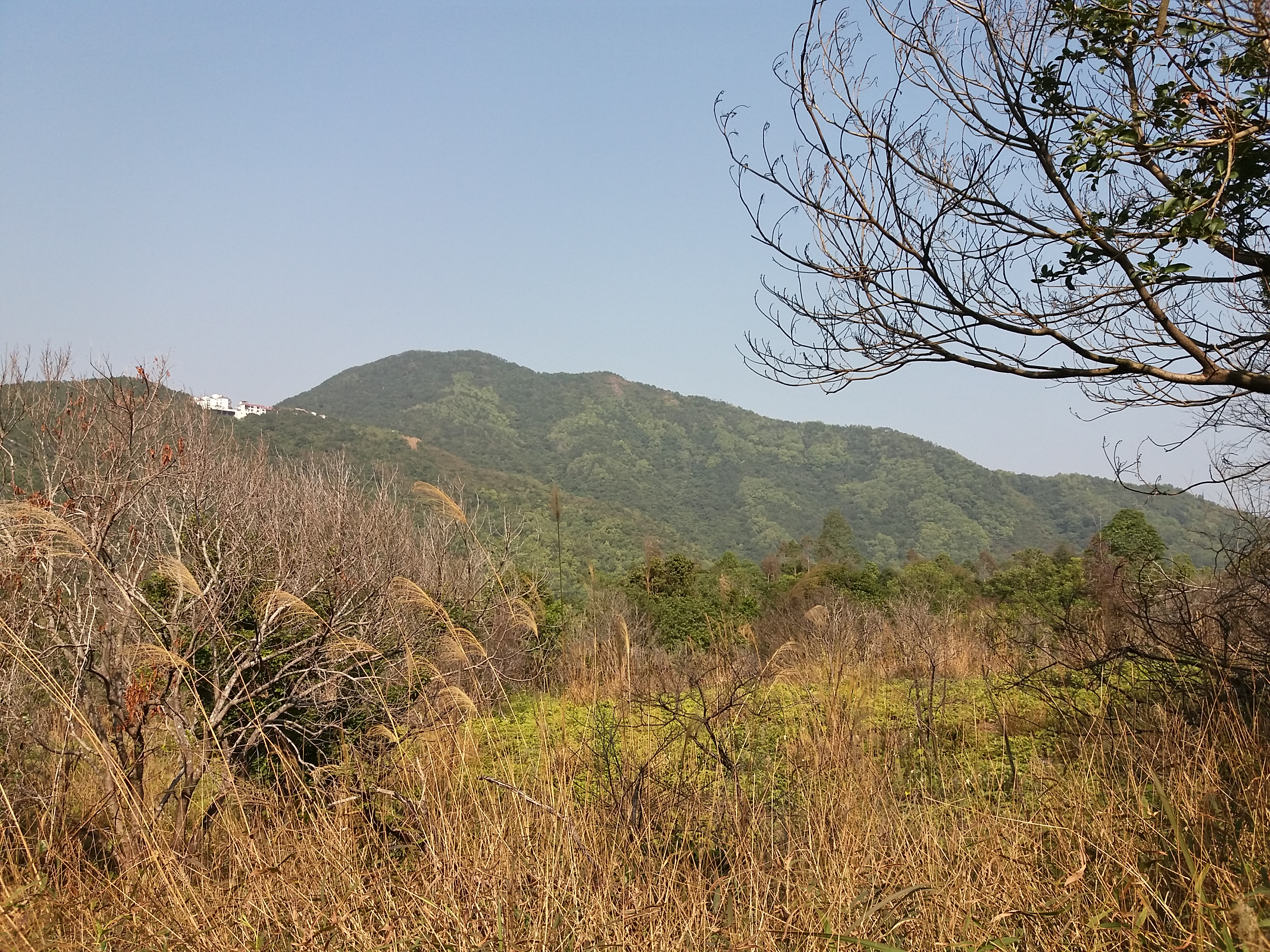
- Western slope of Razor Hill, from Au Tau / Tseng Lan Shue

Highest point
- Elevation: 432 m (1,417 ft)
- Listing: List of mountains, peaks and hills in Hong Kong
- Coordinates: 22°19′51.1″N 114°15′12.64″E

Naming
- English translation: Francolin hill

Geography
- Location within Hong Kong
- Location: Eastern New Territories, Hong Kong

Razor Hill, also locally known as Che Kwu Shan (Chinese: 鷓鴣山), is a hill between Pik Uk, Ta Ku Ling, Tseung Kwan O, and Tai Po Tsai in the New Territories of Hong Kong. It is 432 metres tall.

The north and east mid slopes are skirted by Clear Water Bay Road.

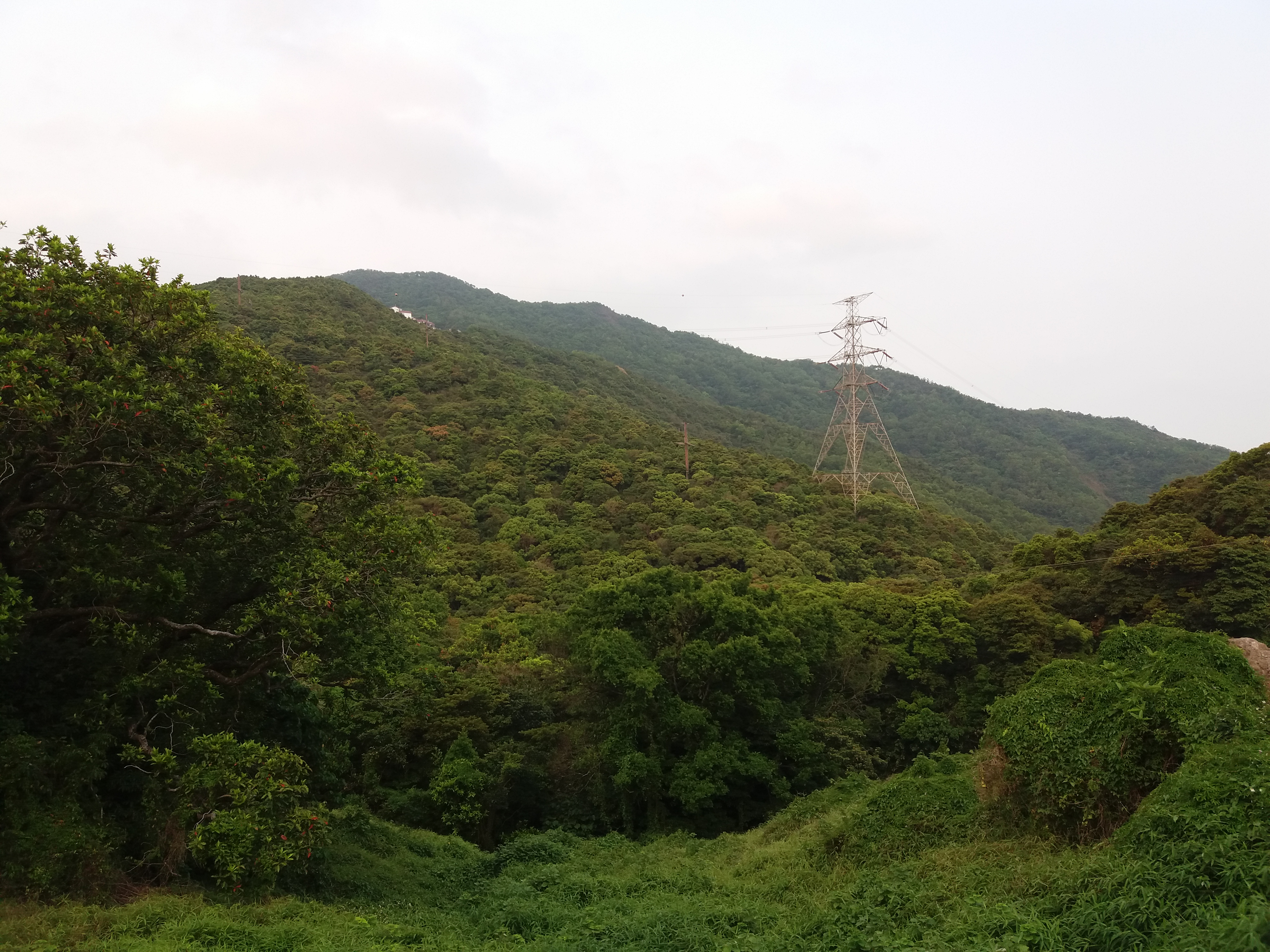
Western slope of Razor Hill, from Little Hawaii Trail, Tseng Lan Shue

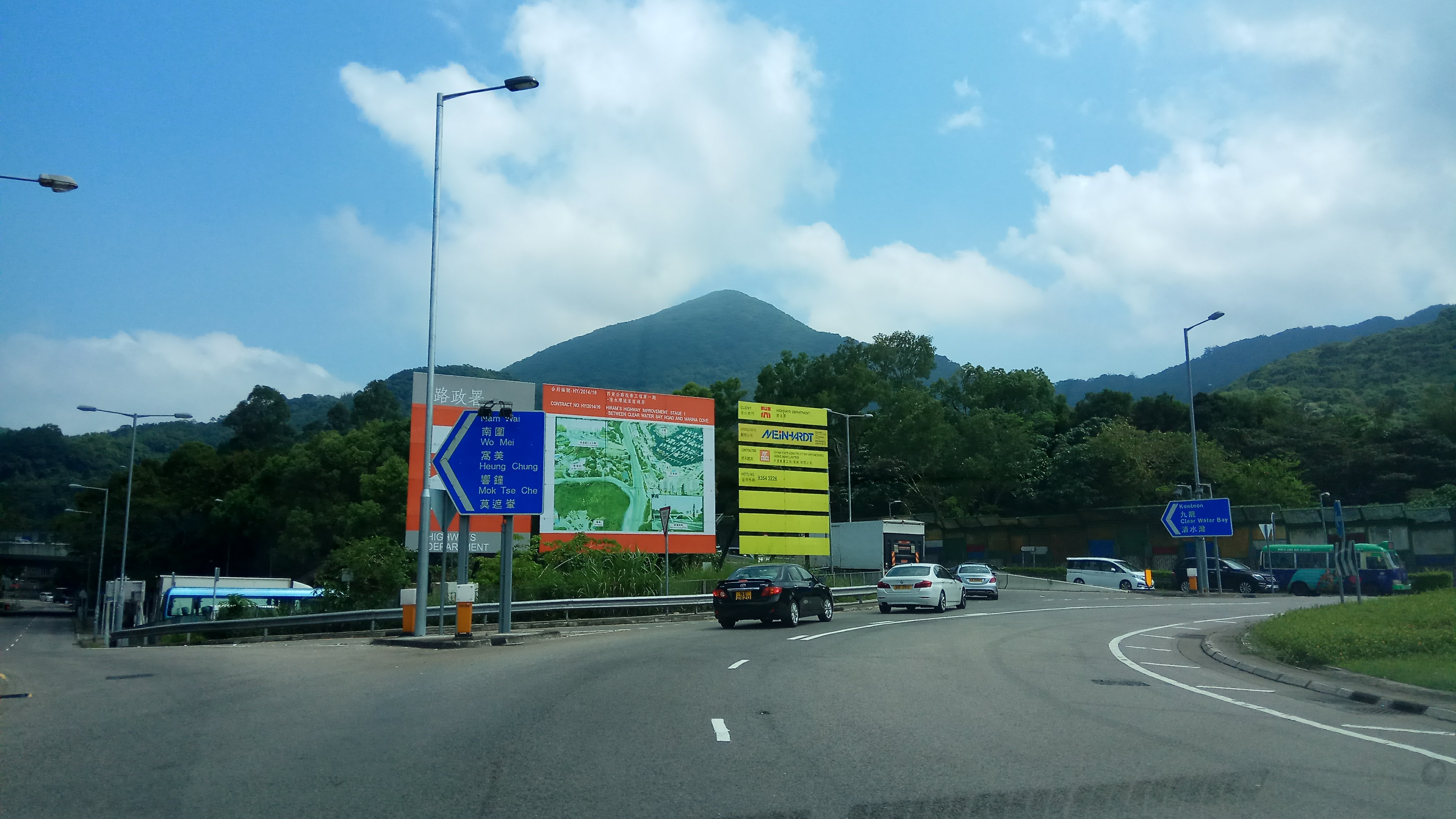
Razor Hill

== See also ==
- Geography of Hong Kong
- Clear Water Bay Road
