= Mau Tso Ngam =

Coordinates: 22.365707°N 114.221142°E

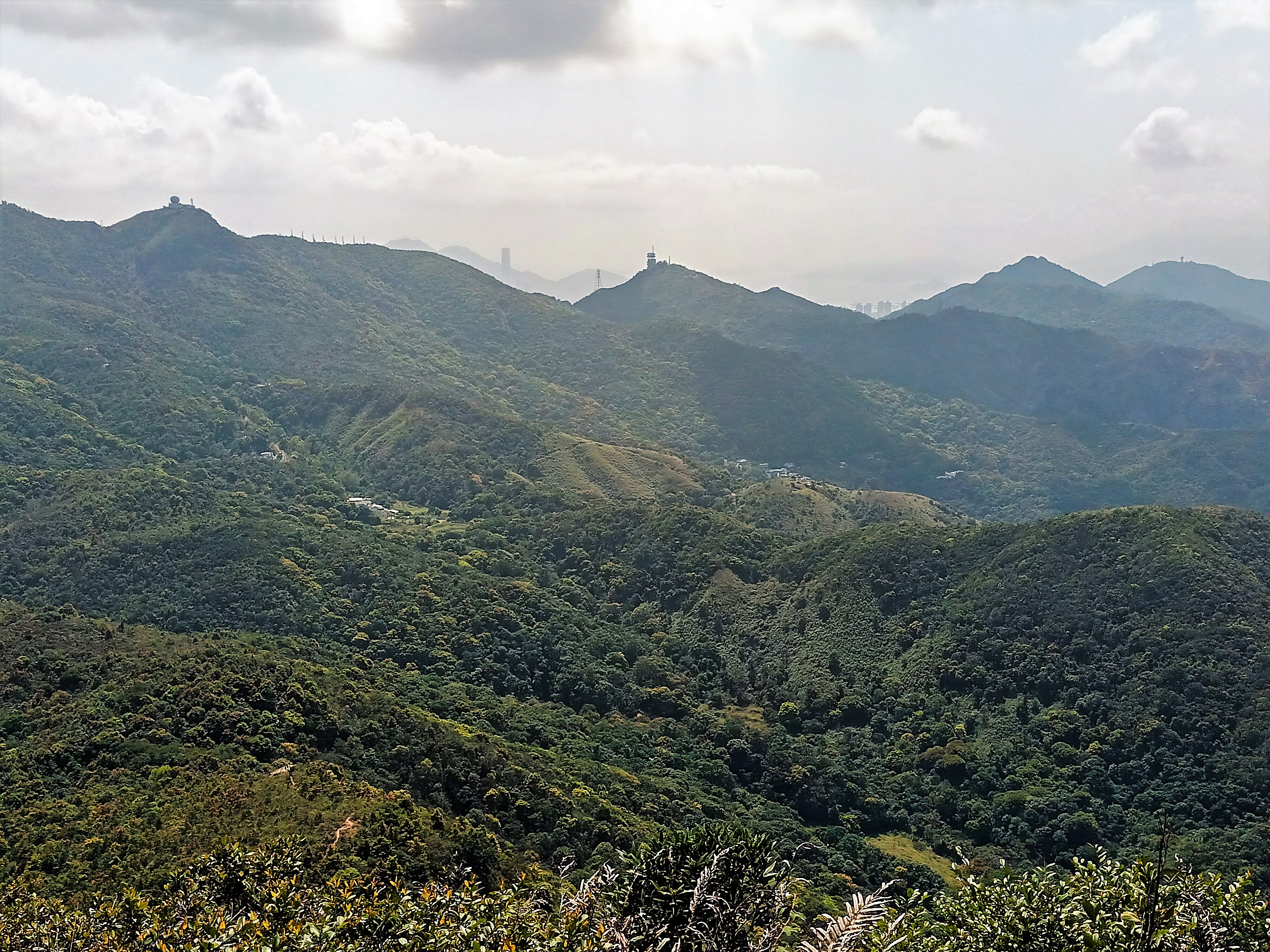
Distant view of the villages of Mau Tso Ngam and Kwun Yam Shan from West Buffalo Hill. The hills Tate's Cairn and Temple Hill are visible in the background.

Mau Tso Ngam (Chinese: 茂草岩) is a village in Sha Tin District, Hong Kong.

== Administration ==
Mau Tso Ngam is a recognized village under the New Territories Small House Policy.

== History ==
As of 1986, Mau Tso Ngam was one of the few villages in the New Territories which were still growing and preparing their own tea in the traditional way.

== See also ==
- Gilwell Campsite
- Kau Yeuk (Sha Tin)
