= Tung Shan (mountain) =

Mountain in Hong Kong

- 東山
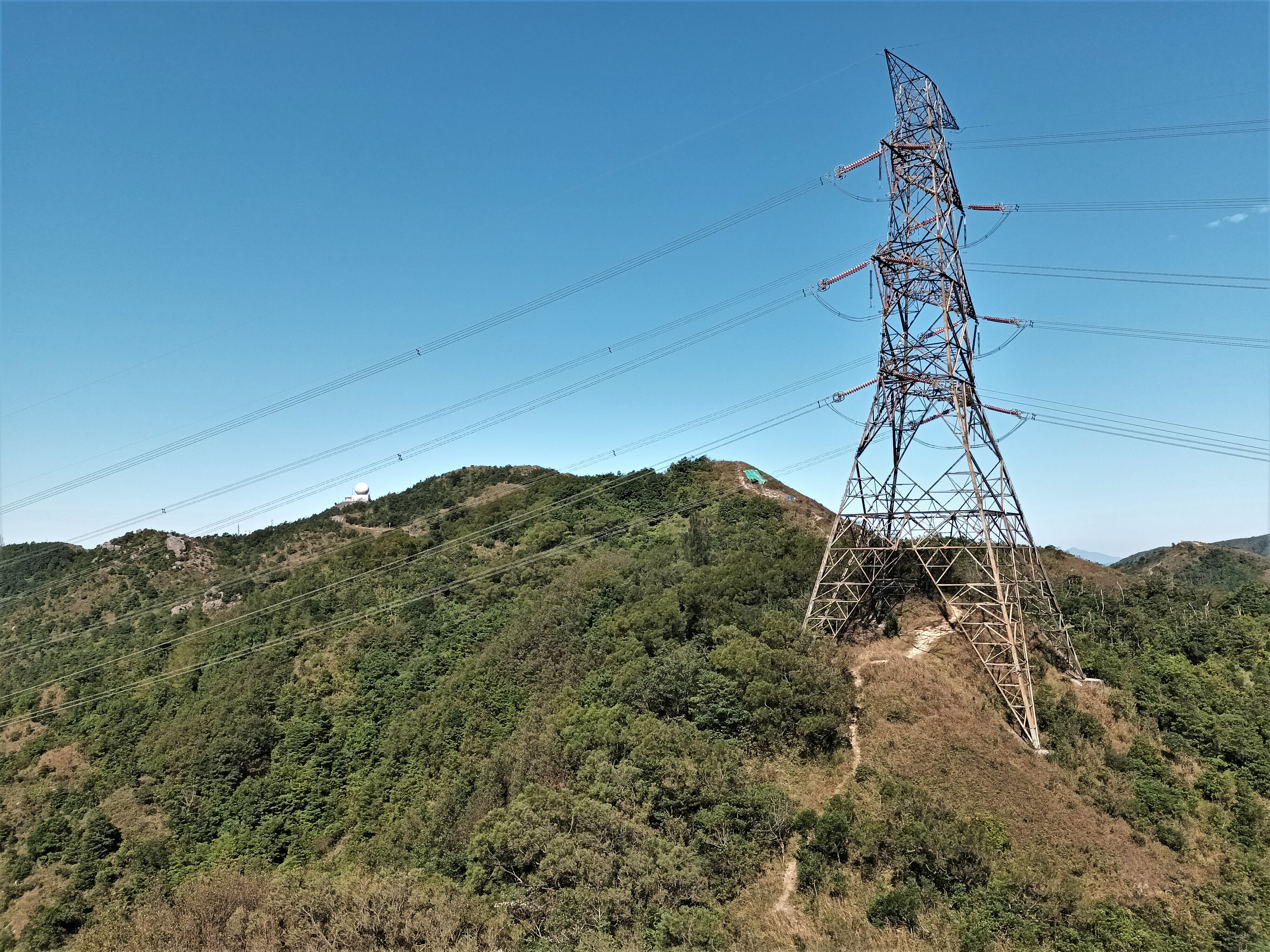
- Tung Shan viewed from the northern slope of Middle Hill.

Highest point
- Elevation: 544 m (1,785 ft)
- Coordinates: 22.352812°N 114.221495°E

Geography
- Location within Hong Kong
- Location: Hong Kong

Tung Shan (Chinese: 東山; Cantonese Yale: dūng shāan; lit. 'East Mountain') is a mountain between Tate's Cairn and Kowloon Peak in Kowloon, Hong Kong. Its summit is 544 m (1,818 ft) high.

== See also ==
- List of mountains, peaks and hills in Hong Kong
- Eight Mountains of Kowloon
