= Fu Yung Pei =

Village in Hong Kong

Coordinates: 22.367048°N 114.219283°E

Fu Yung Pei (Chinese: 芙蓉泌) aka. Fu Yung Pit (芙蓉別) is a village in Sha Tin District, Hong Kong.

== Administration ==
Fu Yung Pit is a recognized village under the New Territories Small House Policy.

== See also ==
- Kau Yeuk (Sha Tin)
- Gilwell Campsite
- Fu Yung Pit, a nearby hill with the same name as the alternate name of the village

== Notes ==
- A hamlet in Sai Kung District is also called 'Fu Yung Pit' (芙蓉別). It is located to the northwest of Nam Shan (Sai Kung District).
