= Lo Shue Tin =

Coordinates: 22.3709598°N 114.2230413°E

Lo Shue Tin, sometimes transliterated as Lo Shu Tin (Chinese: 老鼠田) is a village in Sha Tin District, Hong Kong.

== Administration ==
Lo Shu Tin is a recognized village under the New Territories Small House Policy.

== See also ==
- Gilwell Campsite
- Kau Yeuk (Sha Tin)
