= Pik Uk =

Village in Hong Kong

Coordinates: 22°20′31.10″N 114°14′49.69″E

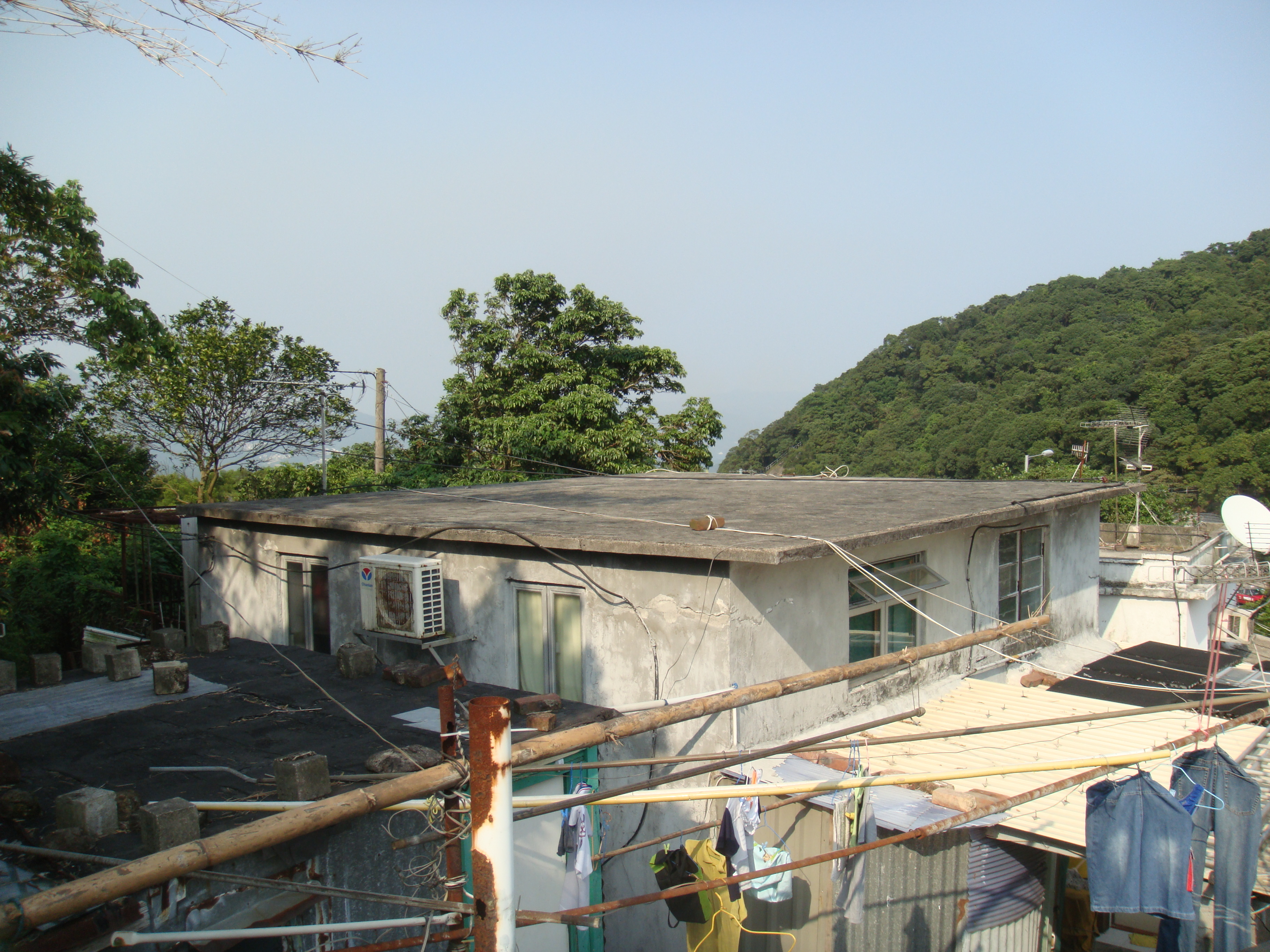
Typical scenery at Pik Uk

Pik Uk (Chinese: 壁屋) is a small village in Sai Kung District, New Territories, Hong Kong.

== Location ==
Pik Uk is located on Clear Water Bay Road, roughly halfway between Ping Shek Estate and the Hang Hau Road roundabout, adjacent to Razor Hill, and not far from Tseng Lan Shue. The village is located to the east of Pik Uk Correctional Institution and Pik Uk Prison.

== Administration ==
Pik Uk is a recognized village under the New Territories Small House Policy.

== History ==
At the time of the 1911 census, the population of Pik Uk was 25. The number of males was 5.

== Layout ==
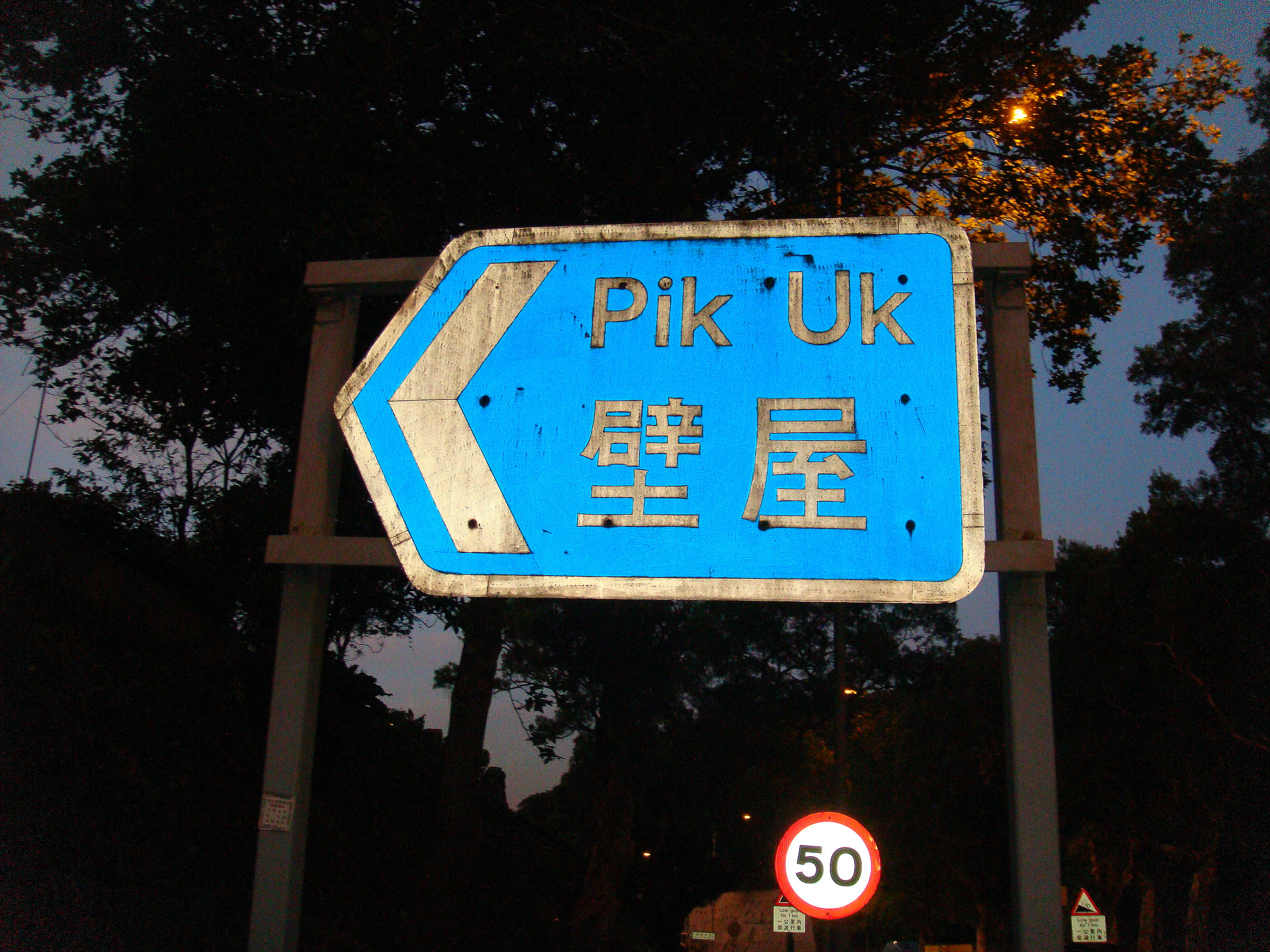
The Pik Uk sign beside Clear Water Bay Road

There are approximately 150 settlements in the village and vacant land that surround the village are regulated by the government. Although home ownership is allowed in the village, the village is regulated by the government in the same manner as the public building estates (like Choi Hung Estate), in which the building estates are only for rent. There are occasionally police that patrol the village.

Pik Uk is divided into New and Lower villages. The houses at Pik Uk New Village are older than the ones on the Lower. There is a 20-space parking lot roughly in between the New and Lower villages. There is also a rest area beside the parking lot with a roof on top, and a bulletin board beside the parking lot posting immediate news and information. The parking lot is connected by a road to Clear Water Bay Road, and a road that leads to the Lower village.

Around the mid-1980s both the New and the Lower villages are one whole village according to mailing codes. But as time went, the New and Lower villages gradually separated and the mailing codes are now different. So, writing "Pik Uk New Village", is not equal to writing "Pik Uk Lower Village", since omitting the New or Lower in the address (e.g. Pik Uk Village) will make the mailing services think that it will go to the Lower village, and also the Lower village has more population.

== Transport ==
Kowloon Motor Bus routes 91, 91M, 92, and several green minibuses and red minibuses serve the village at a nearby bus stop.
