= Kowloon Peak =

Mountain in Kowloon, Hong Kong

- 飛鵝山
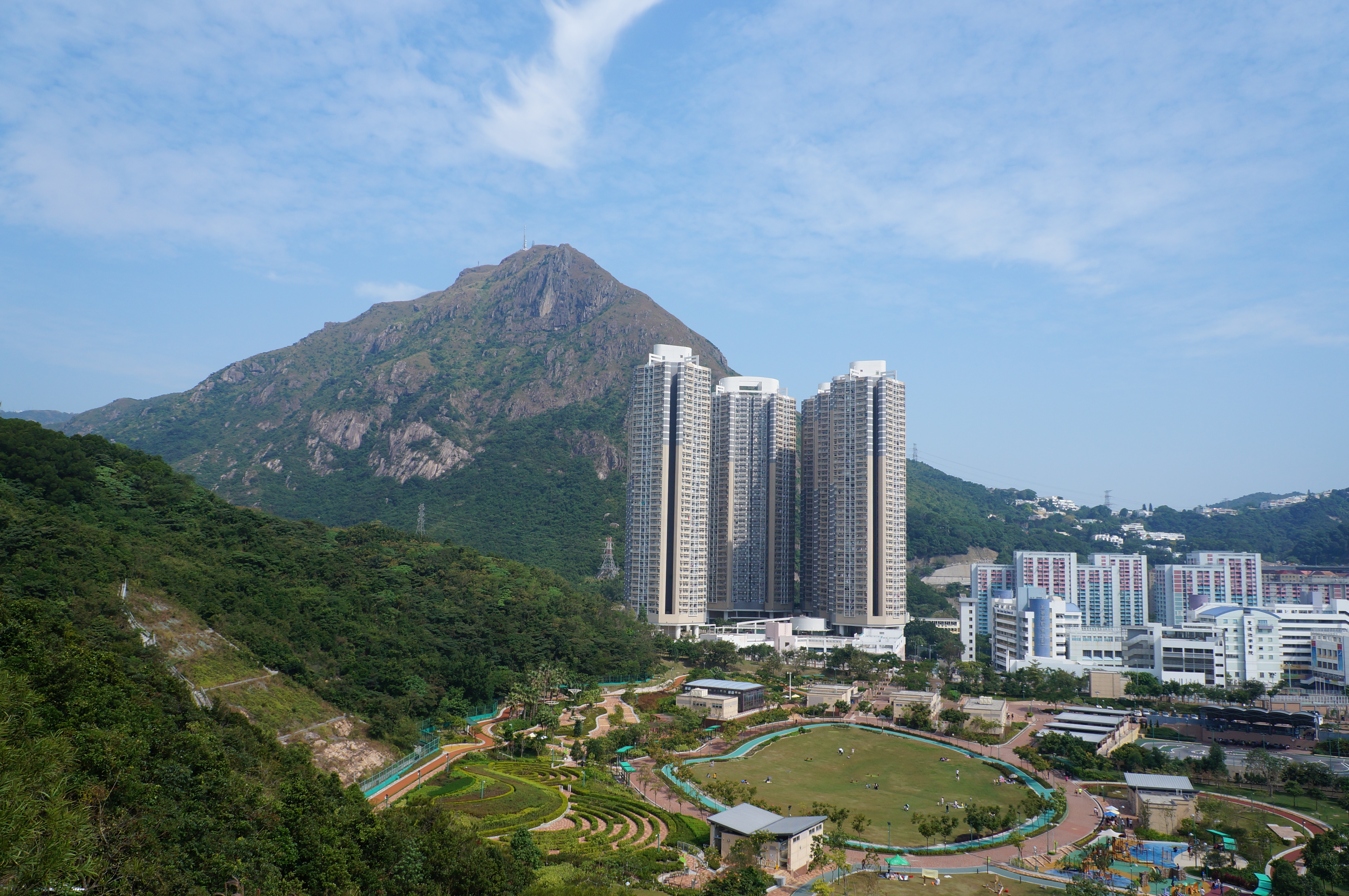
- View of Kowloon Peak

Highest point
- Elevation: 602 m (1,975 ft); HKPD
- Coordinates: 22°20′27.16″N 114°13′23.64″E

Geography
- Location within Hong Kong
- Location: Hong Kong

Kowloon Peak
- Traditional Chinese: 飛鵝山
- Simplified Chinese: 飞鹅山
- Cantonese Yale: Fēi ngòh shāan
- Literal meaning: Soaring Goose Mountain
Transcriptions
Standard Mandarin
- Hanyu Pinyin: Fēié Shān
Hakka
- Romanization: Fei1 Ngo2 San1 / Fei Ngo4 San1
Yue: Cantonese
- Yale Romanization: Fēi ngòh shāan
- Jyutping: Fei1 ngo4 saan1

Kowloon Peak, also known as Fei Ngo Shan (literally: "Soaring Goose Mountain", 飛鵝山), is a 1,975-foot-tall (602 m) mountain in the northeast corner of New Kowloon, Hong Kong, situated in Ma On Shan Country Park. With the summit located just to the east of the border between Wong Tai Sin and Sai Kung districts, it is the tallest mountain in Kowloon, and is crossed by both the Wilson Trail and the MacLehose Trail.

On the lower slopes of Tung Yeung Shan about 1.1 miles (1.8 kilometres) to the north is the Gilwell Campsite, belonging to The Scout Association.

== Geography ==
Kowloon Peak has a steep slope facing south towards northwestern Kowloon, while having a relatively smooth curve towards the east and west. The peak connects with Middle Hill (象山), known also as Cheung Shan, and Tung Shan (東山) in the north, forming a ridge of mountains. Despite being in an easily accessible location by car and walks, there are occasional sighting reports of Burmese pythons, East Asian porcupines, red muntjacs and wild boars.

== Geology ==
Kowloon Peak consists mainly of volcanic rocks (many of which are tuffs), and blocks of granite at the base of the mountain.

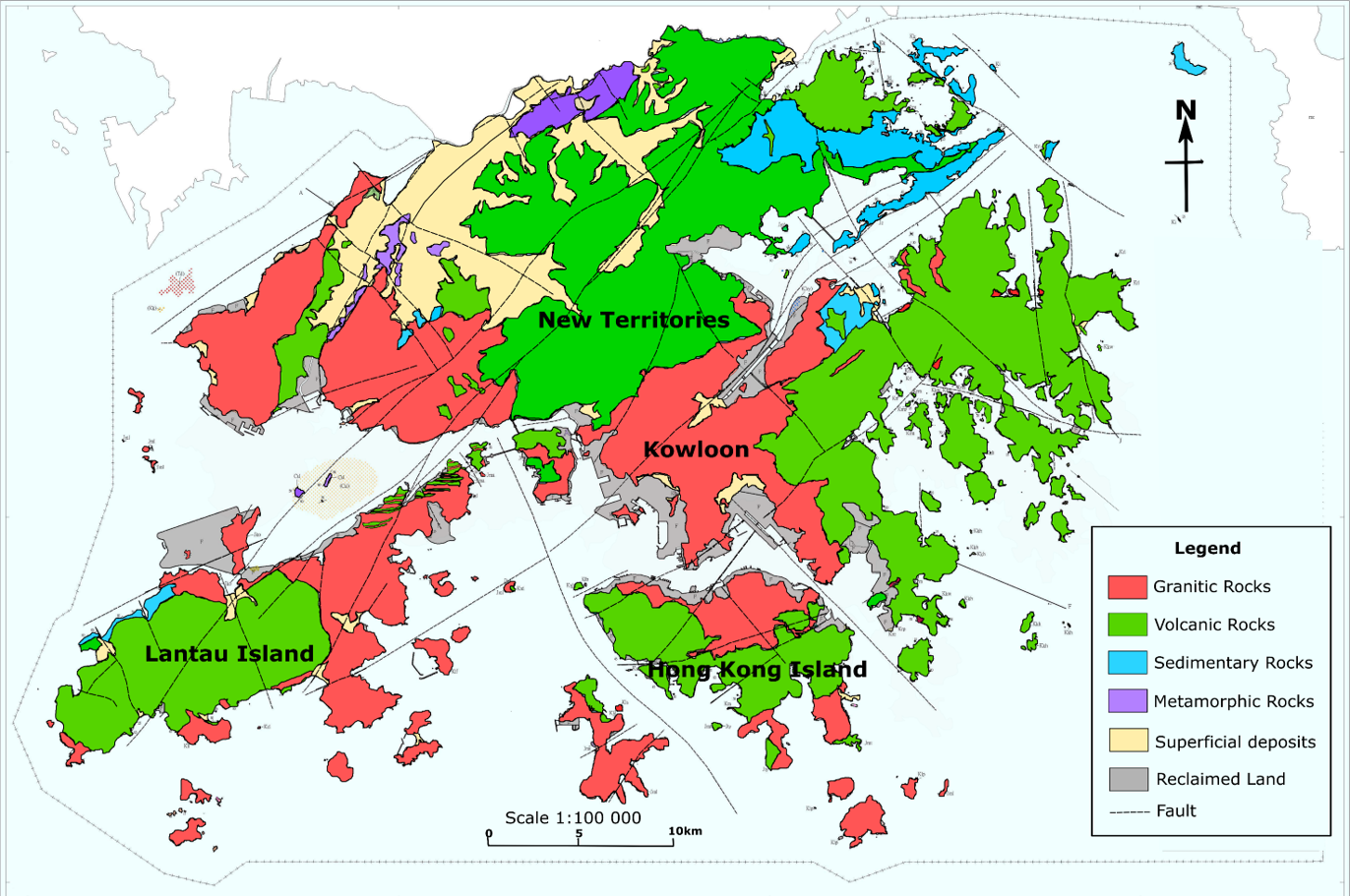
A Hong Kong Geographical Map showing the types of rocks there. Kowloon Peak is in between the red and green areas, which shows it consists of volcanic and granitic rocks.

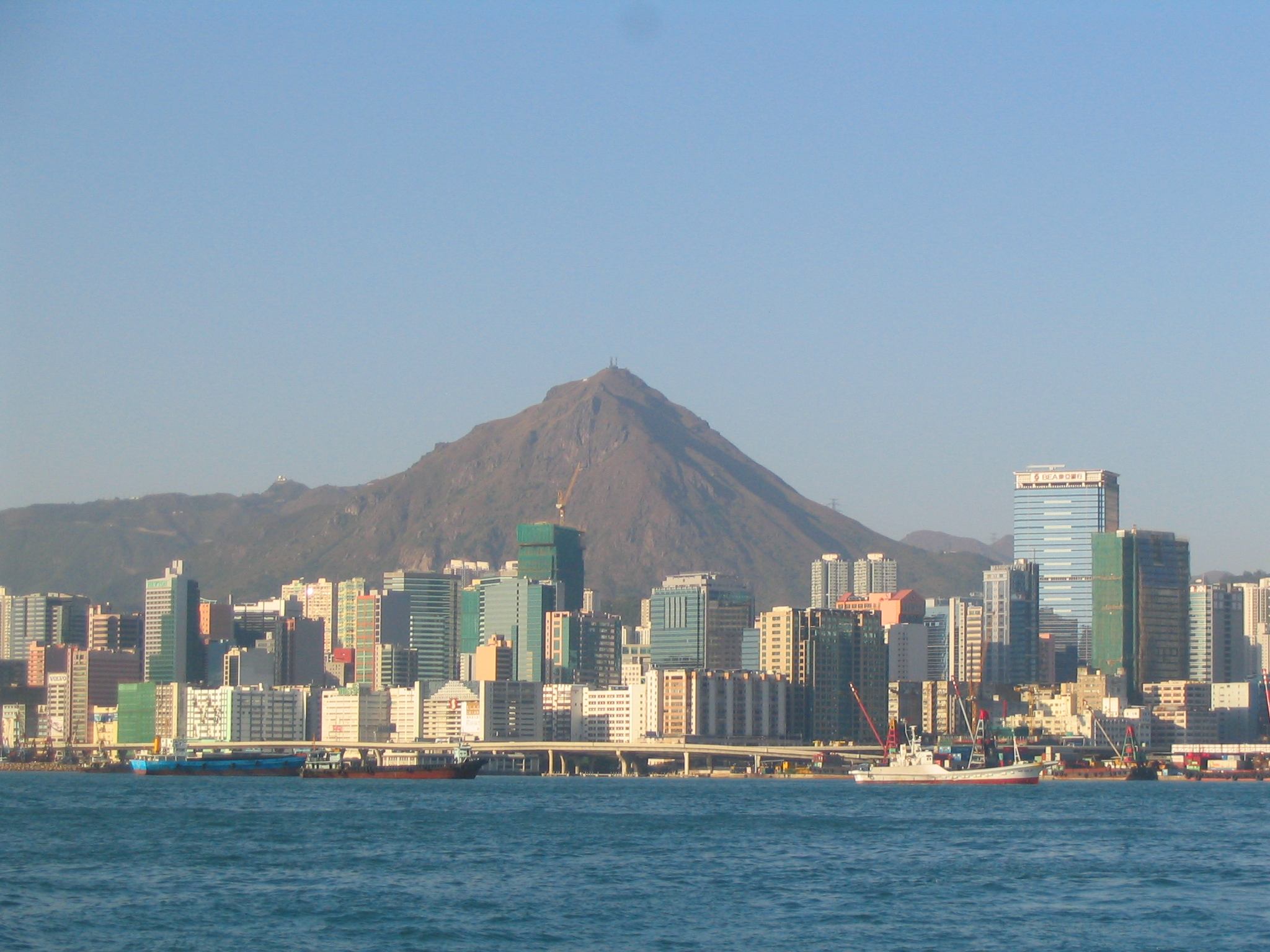
Kowloon Peak and Kwun Tong from Hong Kong Island in December 2006.

== Hiking and access ==
There are several paths from Jat's Incline and Fei Ngo Shan Road that lead to the summit. One of Hong Kong's most treacherous and dangerous climbs is the rock climb from Clear Water Bay Road to Kowloon Peak's summit through Suicide Cliff.

Suicide Cliff is not necessarily a place where people commit suicide, but it is such named most likely because the climb is so treacherous, it is akin to committing suicide. The hike has also seen numerous injuries and fatalities. In one instance, two Chinese tourists sought assistance on Kowloon Peak's Suicide Cliff and caused an extensive rescue operation involving 160 firefighters.

For casual hikers, choosing the easiest path to the summit through Fei Ngo Shan Road is recommended.

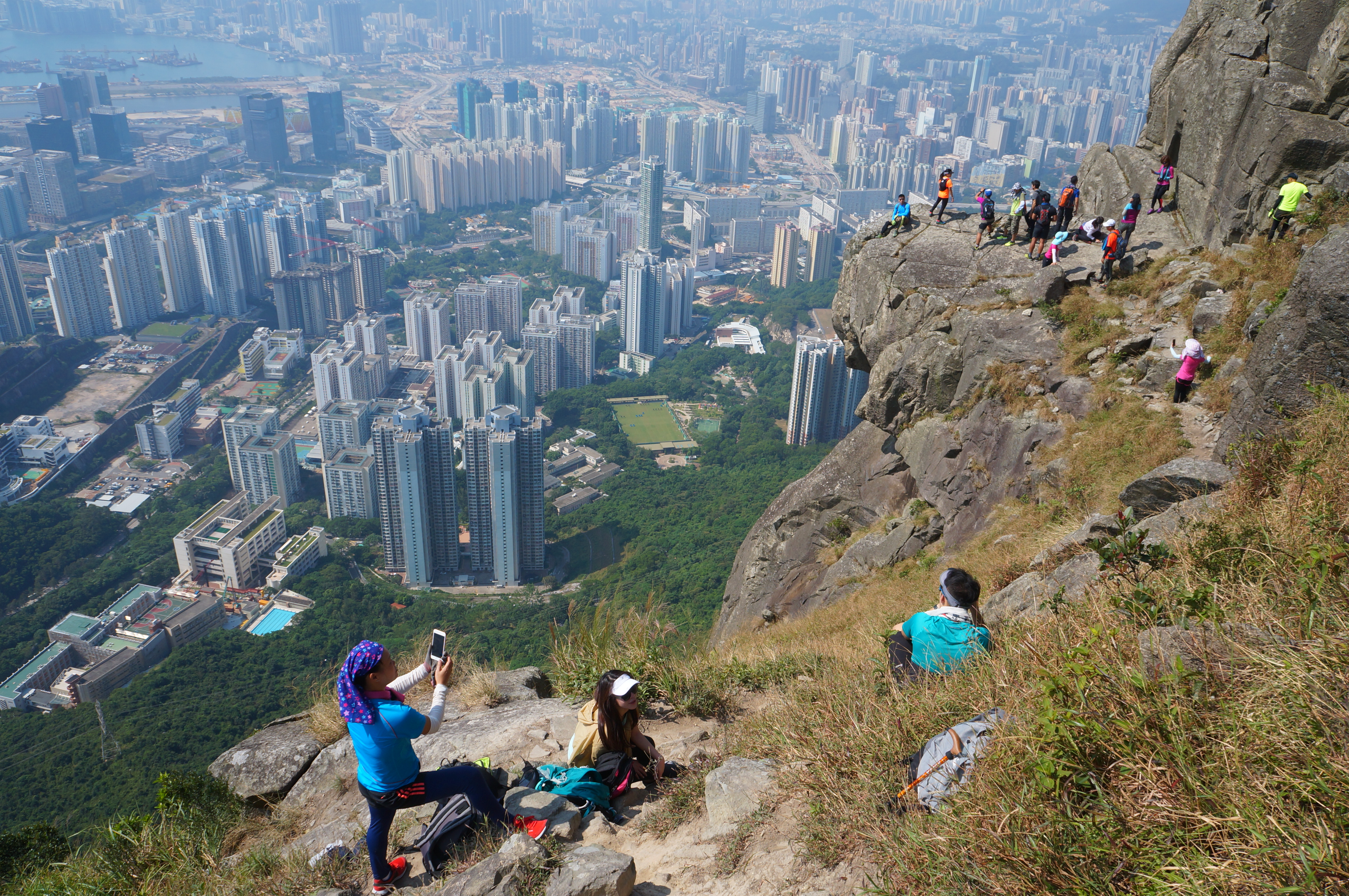
Suicide Cliff, Kowloon Peak in October 2017. No barrier fencing means a slip could result in fatality

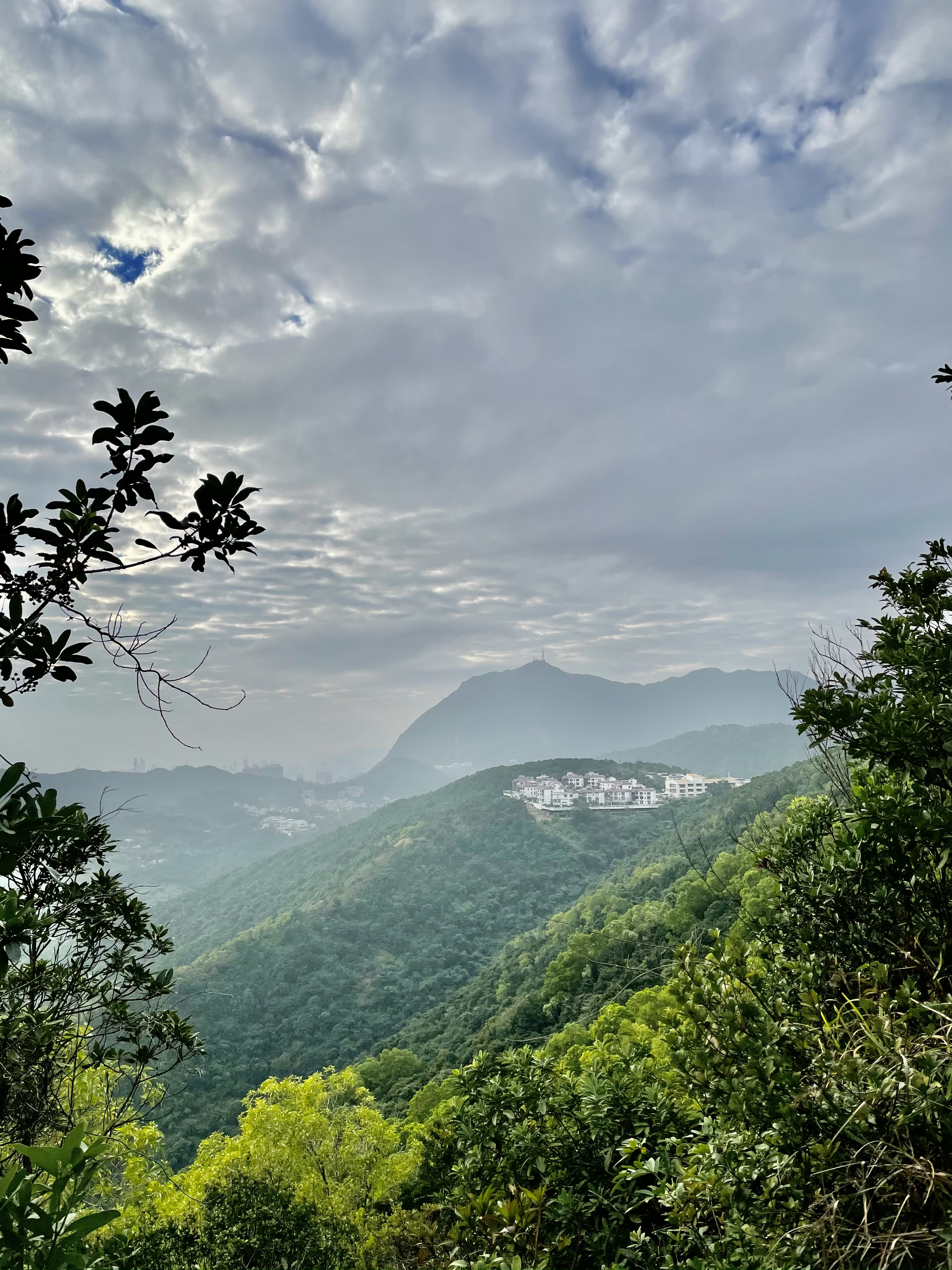
Kowloon Peak in the mist viewed from the Razor Hill Ridge in December 2020

== Transport ==
=== Fei Ngo Shan Road ===
Fei Ngo Shan Road (飛鵝山道; literally meaning Soaring Goose Hill Road) is a road in the New Territories, between Cha Liu Au and Tate's Cairn within Sai Kung District.

It traverses the eastern slopes of Kowloon Peak, Middle Hill and Tung Shan, and the western slope of Cham Tin Shan. "Fei Ngo Shan" is the name of Kowloon Peak in the Cantonese language.

The stretch of the road between Tate's Pass (Tai Lo Au) and the junction with Jat's Incline and Sha Tin Pass Road near Tiu Tso Ngam lies within Wong Tai Sin District of New Kowloon. This northwesternmost stretch of Fei Ngo Shan Road is part of Stage 4 of the Wilson Trail.

Houses along Fei Ngo Shan Road are among the most expensive in the New Territories.

== See also ==
- List of mountains, peaks and hills in Hong Kong
- Eight Mountains of Kowloon
- Customs Pass
- Gilwell Campsite
- Pak Kung Au
- List of streets and roads in Hong Kong
