= Tseng Lan Shue =

Village in Hong Kong

Coordinates: 22°20′3.57″N 114°14′15.56″E

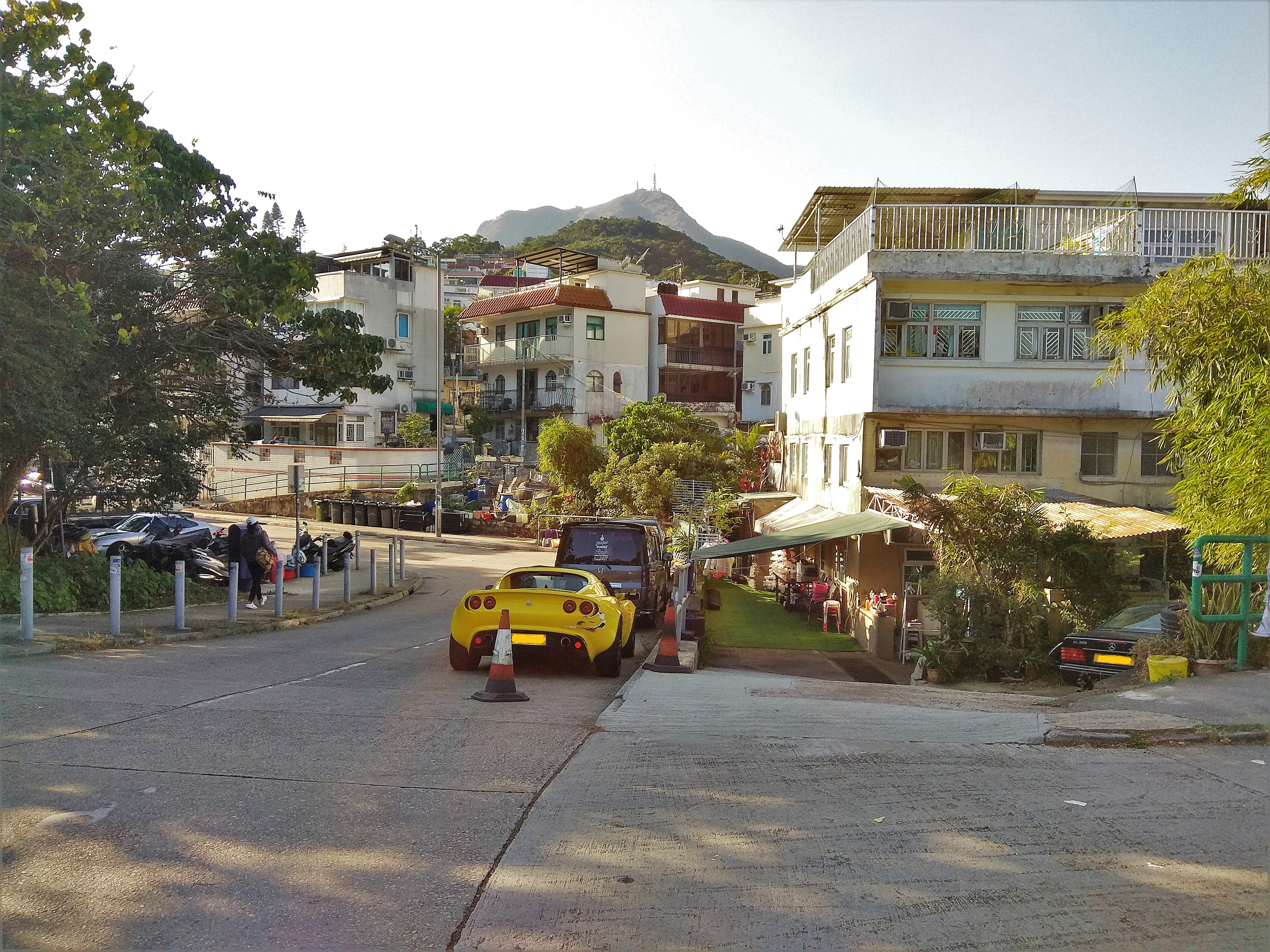
Tseng Lan Shue viewed from Clear Water Bay Road. Kowloon Peak is visible in the background.

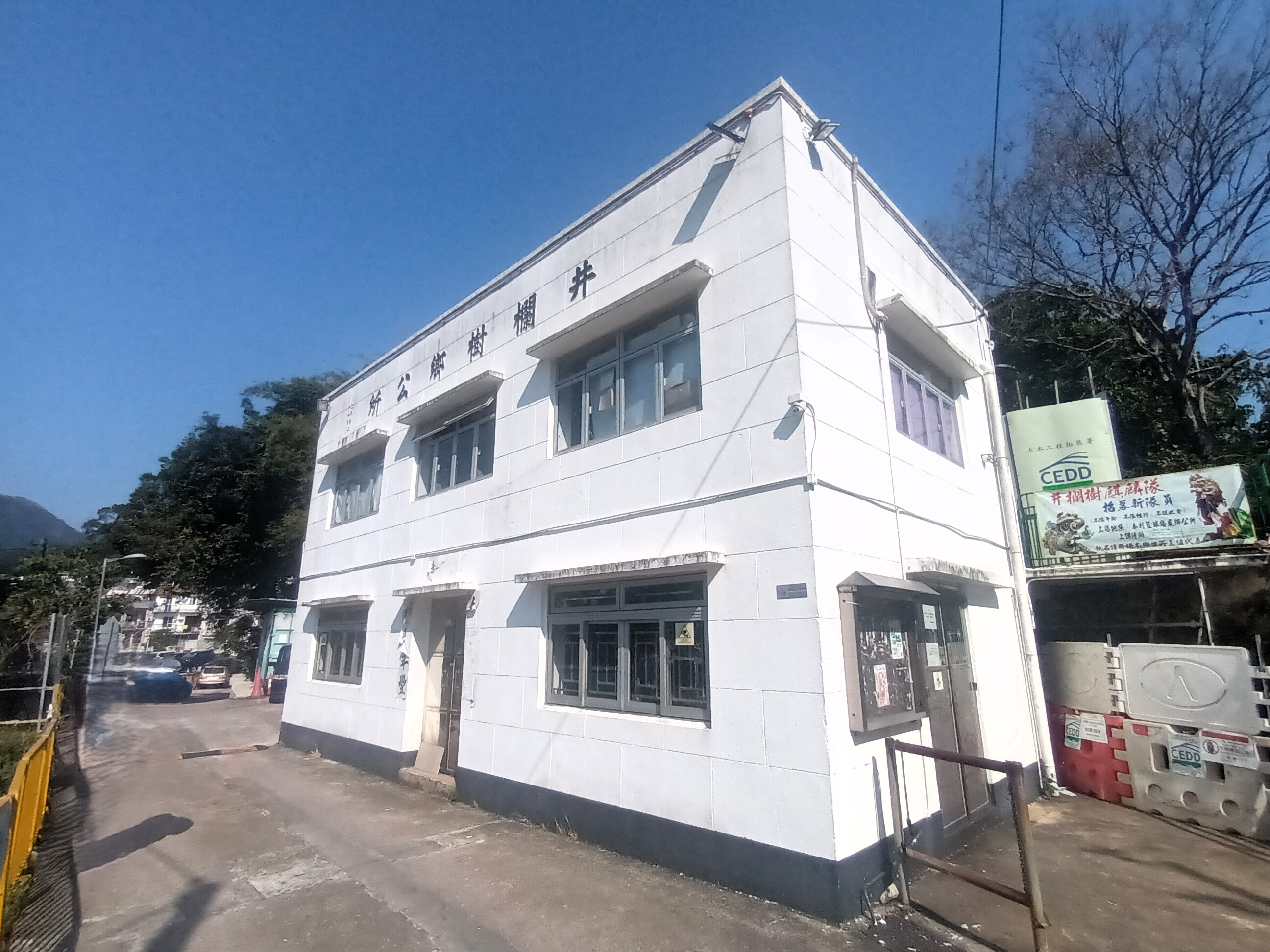
Tseng Lan Shue Village Office

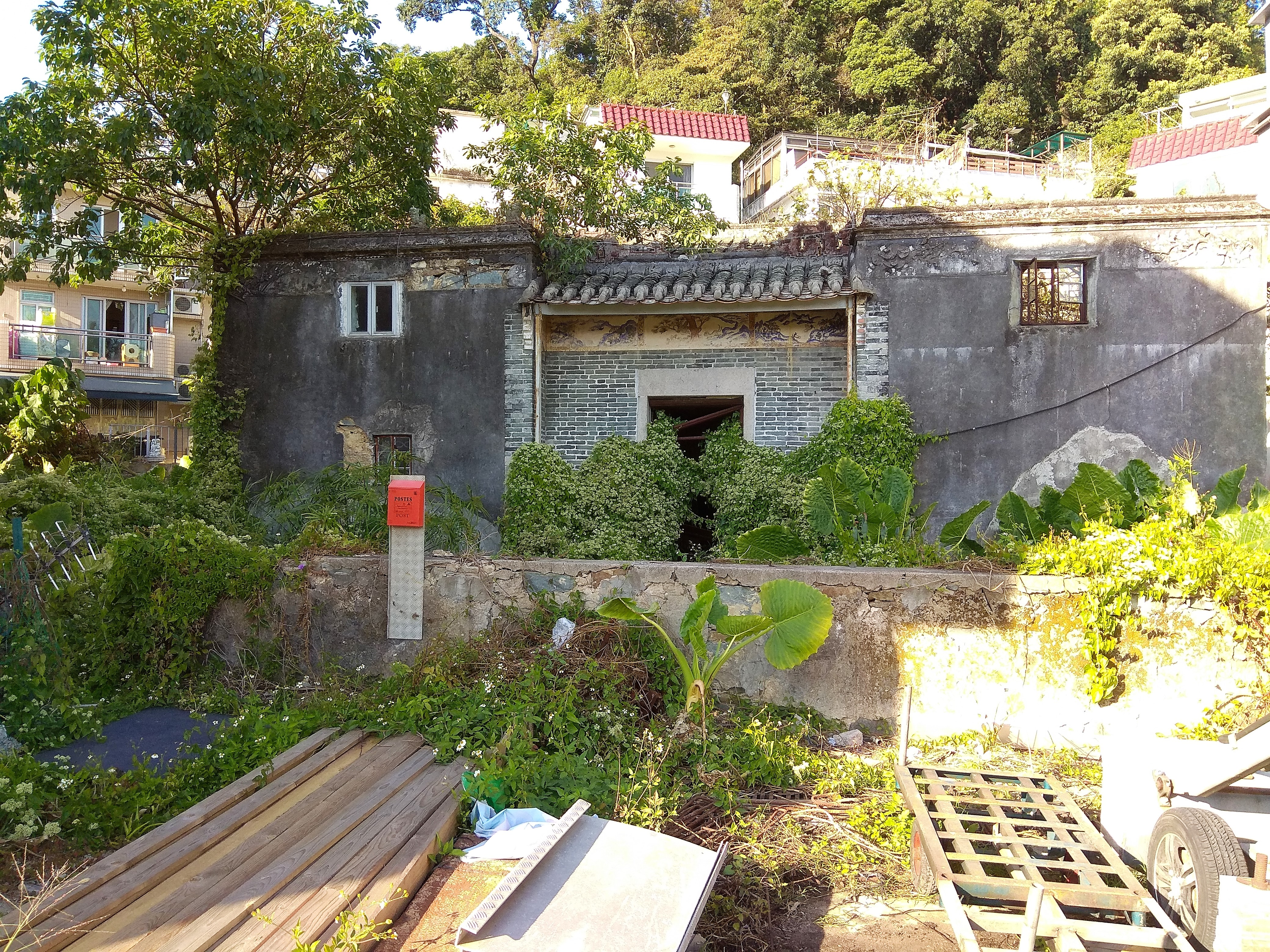
House at No. 43 Tseng Lan Shue, a Grade III historic building.

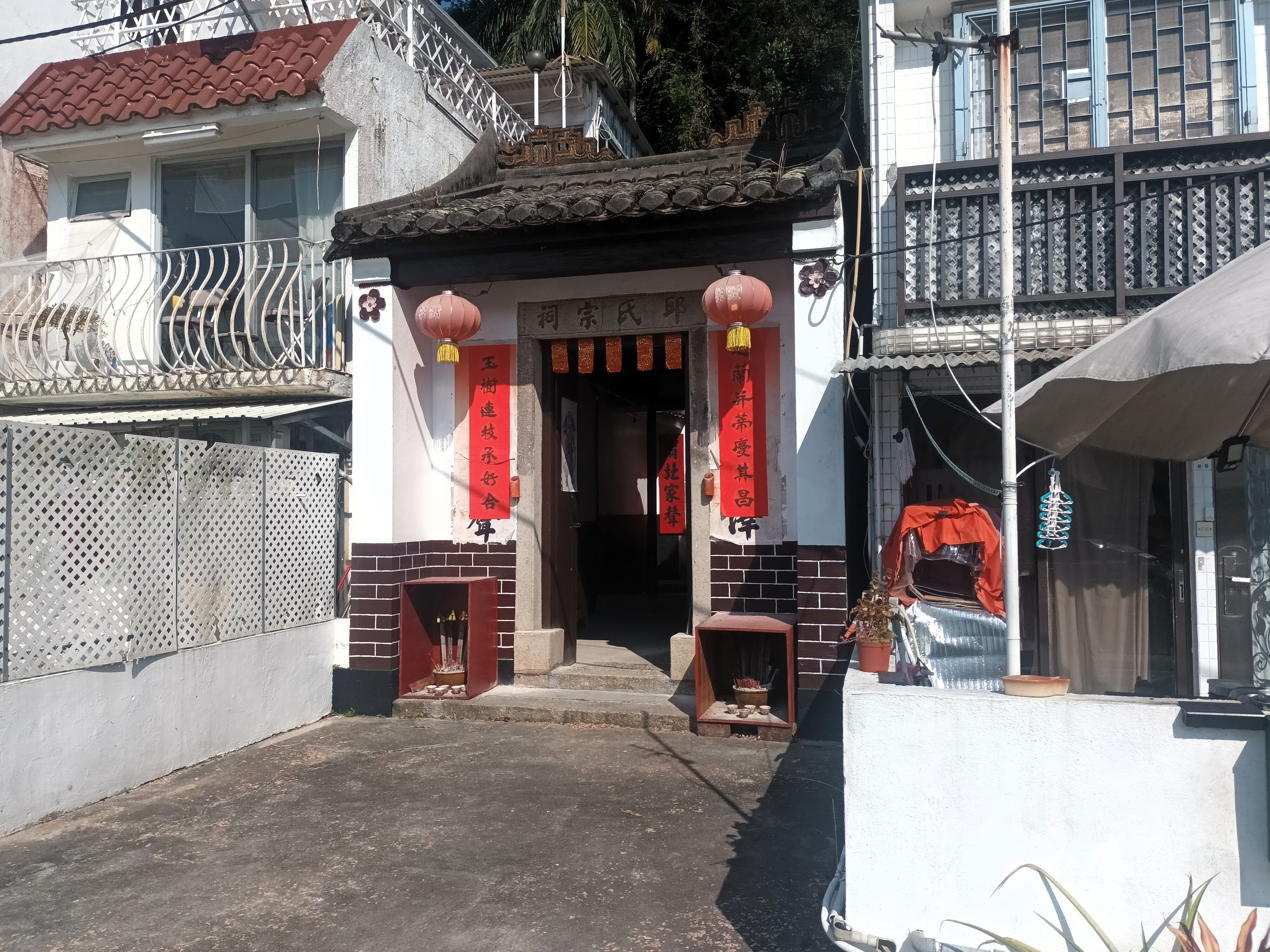
Yau Ancestral Hall, at No. 53 Tseng Lan Shue

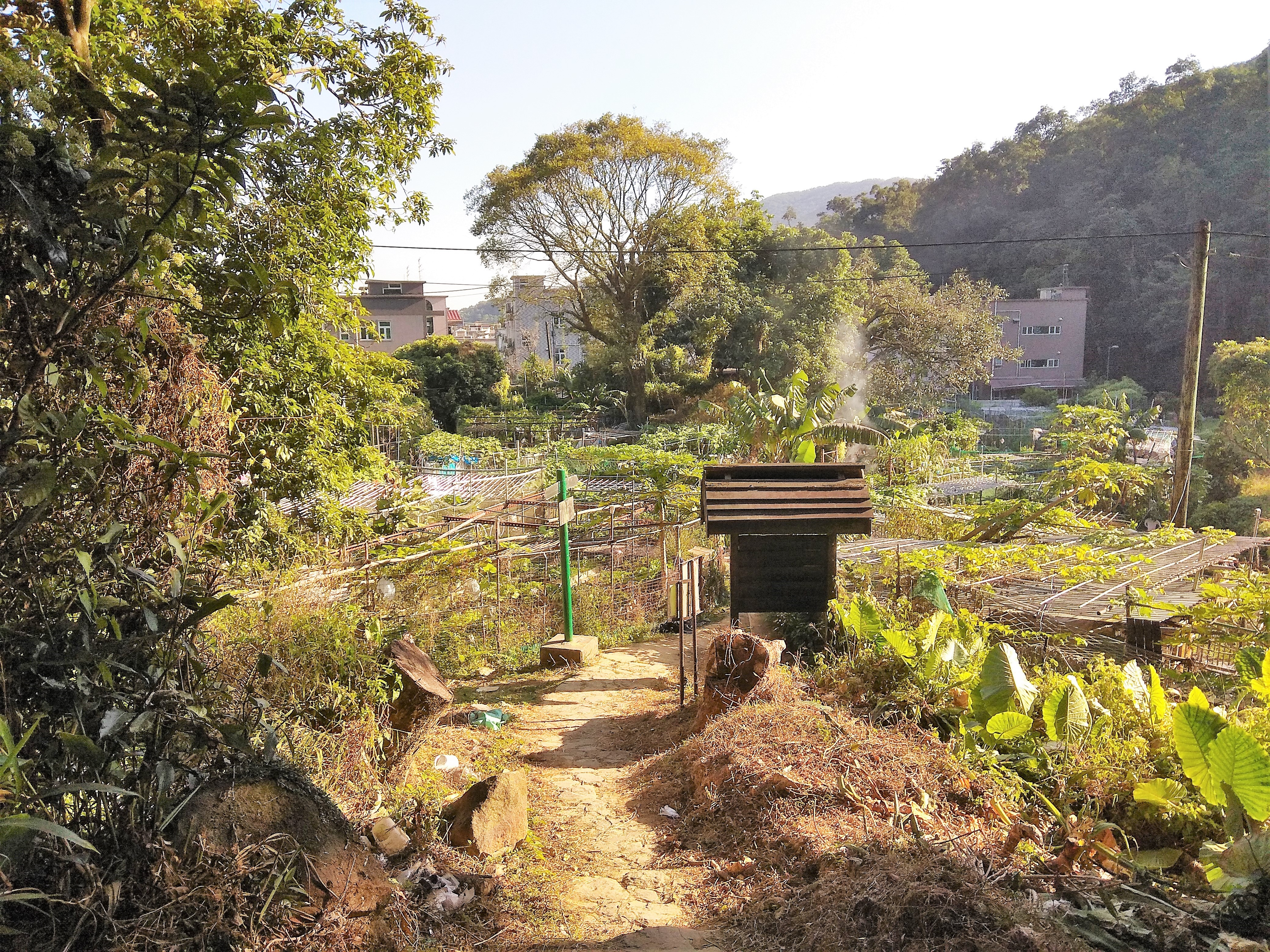
Cultivated land at Tseng Lan Shue, along Wilson Trail Stage 4

Tseng Lan Shue (Chinese: 井欄樹) is a village in Clear Water Bay, Sai Kung District, Hong Kong.

== Location ==
Tseng Lan Shue is located on Clear Water Bay Road, 3 kilometres (1.9 miles) east of Kowloon Peak and 2 kilometres (1.2 miles) southwest of Pik Uk.

== Administration ==
Tseng Lan Shue is a recognized village under the New Territories Small House Policy.

== History ==
At the time of the 1911 census, the population of Tseng Lan Shue was 276. The number of males was 124.

== Buildings and amenities ==
The village has about 250 residential settlements and a basketball court. There are some shops on the roadside.

The house at No. 43 Tseng Lan Shue, built around the 1900s, has been listed as a Grade III historic building.

== Environment ==
A small river runs through the village. In 2007, a 3-meter snake, Burmese python, killed a goat in front of villagers. Since this type of snake is considered endangered in Hong Kong, it was put in a wildlife conservation. In 2026, 3-meter python, believed to have swallowed a goat, was found near a farm in Tseng Lan Shue village.

== Nearby hamlets ==
The nearby hamlets of Au Tau (凹頭) and Pak Shek Wo (白石窩) have been described as subsidiary villages of Tseng Lan Shue.

== Education ==
Tseng Lan Shue is in Primary One Admission (POA) School Net 95. Within the school net are multiple aided schools (operated independently but funded with government money) and one government school: Tseung Kwan O Government Primary School (將軍澳官立小學).

== Public transport ==
Kowloon Motor Bus routes 91, 91M, 92, and several green minibuses and red minibuses serve the village at a nearby bus stop on Clear Water Bay Road. Services run along Clear Water Bay Road to/from Choi Hung station (3.4 kilometres (2.1 miles) to the east) and beyond. Choi Hung is the most accessible station on the Hong Kong MTR to Tseng Lan Shue.

The village is one of the benchmarks for hikers on the Wilson Trail, which crosses the village. Clear Water Bay Road marks the separation between stage 3 and stage 4 of the Wilson Trail.
