= George Passman Tate =

George Passman Tate, FRGS, (1856–1941) was an Anglo-Indian surveyor and authority on the history of Afghanistan.

== Career as Surveyor ==
Tate was employed as Assistant Superintendent of the Surveyor General of India and was deployed to conduct critical surveys in Afghanistan such as Baluch-Afghan Boundary Commission (1895‒96) and Seistan Arbitration Mission (1903‒5).

Tate (along with J.W. Newland) also conducted surveys in Hong Kong in 1899 to 1900 and believed to be the namesake of Tate's Cairn (the hill was renamed sometime after Tate's time in Hong Kong).

== Personal ==
Born in 1856 in Bengal, beyond his surveyor career little is known about Tate. After departing Hong Kong he worked in Afghanistan and retired in 1911, moving to Uttar Pradesh in 1913 with his wife Charlotte Leonora Still and died in Bengal in 1941. He was a member of The Asiatic Society and a fellow of the Royal Geographical Society.

== Selected publications ==
- The frontiers of Baluchistan: Travels on the borders of Persia and Afghanistan. Witherby & Co., London, 1909.
- Seistan: A memoir on the history, topography, ruins, and people of the country, in four parts. Superintendent Government Printing, Calcutta, 1910–1912.
- The Kingdom of Afghanistan: A historical sketch. Printed by Bennett Coleman & Co., Published at the Times of India offices, Bombay & Calcutta, 1911.
- Kalat: A memoir on the country and family of the Ahmadzai Khans of Kalat &c. Calcutta, 1896.
