= Tai Po Tsai =

Village and area in Hong Kong

Coordinates: 22.337383°N 114.259653°E

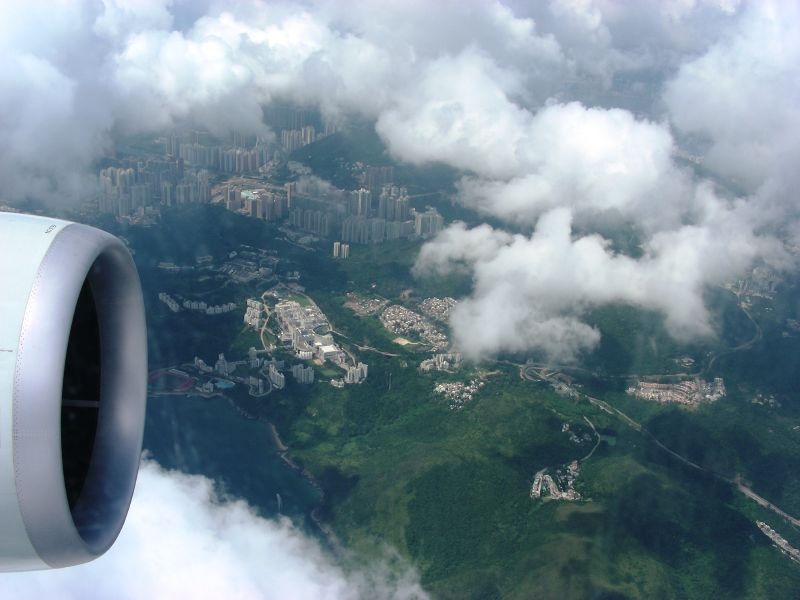
Aerial view of Tai Po Tsai (centre) and surrounding area. The buildings in the upper part belong to Tseung Kwan O New Town. Those on the left belong to HKUST.

Tai Po Tsai (Chinese: 大埔仔) is an area and a village, clustering in a small plain around Clear Water Bay Road in Clear Water Bay Peninsula, Sai Kung District, Hong Kong.

== Geography ==
Tai Po Tsai is located northeast of Tseung Kwan O New Town on the east mid slope of Razor Hill (Che Kwu Shan) and faces Port Shelter. Pak Shui Wun (白水碗), a beach off Tai Po Tsai, is on the shore of Port Shelter.

== Tai Po Tsai Village ==
Tai Po Tsai Village is a recognized village under the New Territories Small House Policy.

The indigenous Punti (本地) villagers all have the Chinese surname of Wan (溫).

Because of its proximity to Shaw Studios and TVB many of their artists rent apartments in the village. Simon Yam Tat-Wah was a long term resident among others. In the 1960s due to its isolation and lack of transport facility, the local villagers set up a primary school for its inhabitants. The school was called Kwong Pui Primary School.

== History ==
Tai Po Tsai is a Cantonese village founded in 1629, making it one of the older villages in Sai Kung. Tai Po Tsai was part of the inter-village grouping, the Ho Chung Tung (蠔涌洞) or Ho Chung Seven Villages (蠔涌七鄉), which had its centre in Ho Chung.

At the time of the 1911 census, the population of Tai Po Tsai was 172. The number of males was 77.

The British Army sited Erskine Barracks adjacent to the village. Among some of the army units stationed there were The Black Watch, The Duke of Edinburgh's Royal Regiment and the Royal Cheshire regiments.

The Diamond Scouting Jubilee Jamboree (27 Dec 1986-01 Jan 1987) was held on the site (Kohima Camp) that was to become the future home of The Hong Kong University of Science and Technology.

== Features ==
The Hong Kong University of Science and Technology and TVB City are major facilities within Tai Po Tsai.
