= Nam Shan (Sai Kung District) =

Hong Kong village

Coordinates: 22.389915°N 114.26336°E

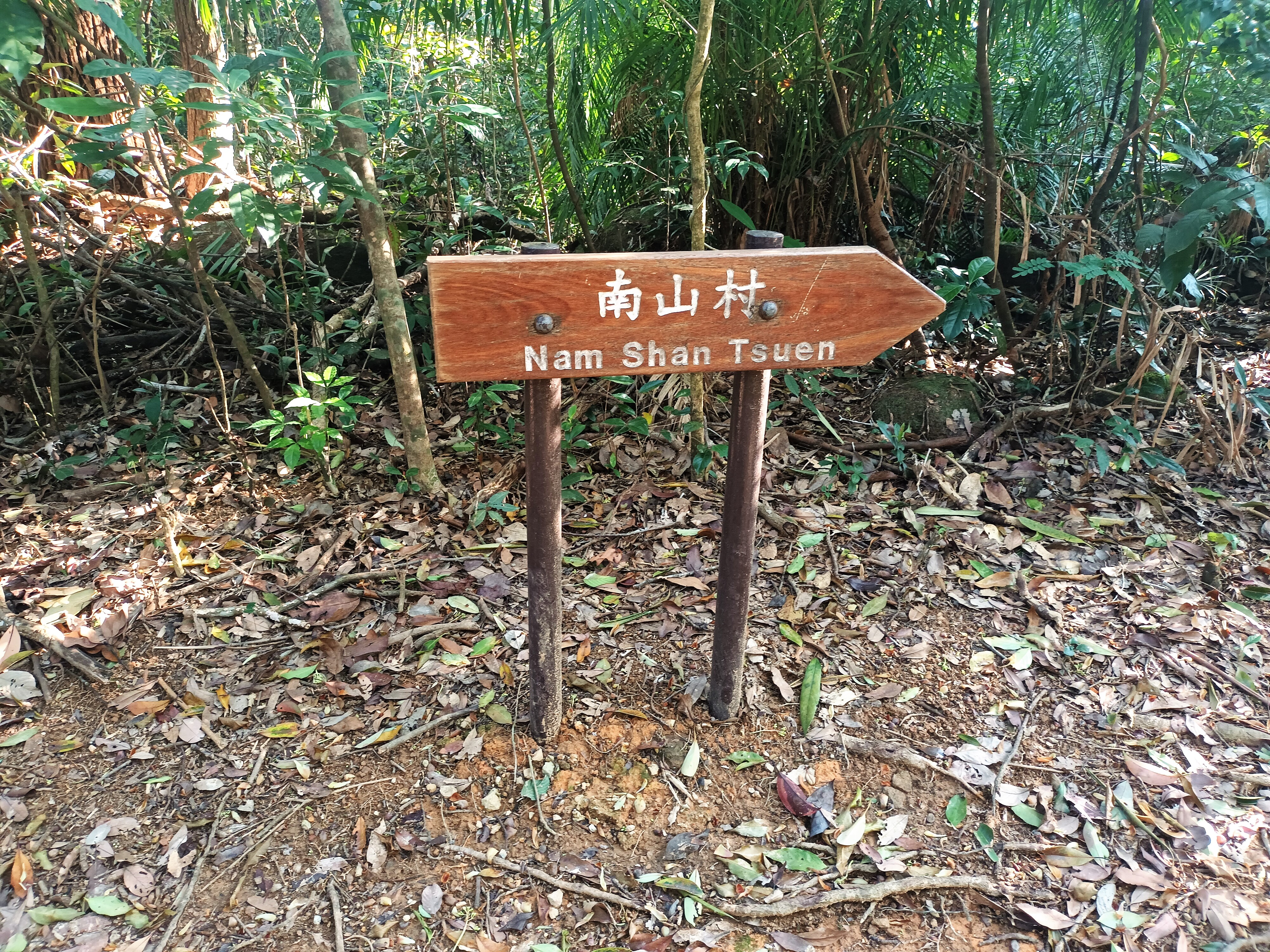
Signpost indicating Nam Shan. Located off MacLehose Trail Section 4, on the eastern slope of Ma On Shan.

Nam Shan (Chinese: 南山) is a village in Sai Kung District, Hong Kong.

== Recognised status ==
Nam Shan, including Kak Hang Tun (隔坑墩) and Long Mei (朗尾), is a recognised village under the New Territories Small House Policy.

== History ==
At the time of the 1911 census, the population of Nam Shan was 86. The number of males was 36.
