= Eight Mountains of Kowloon =

Mountain group in Hong Kong

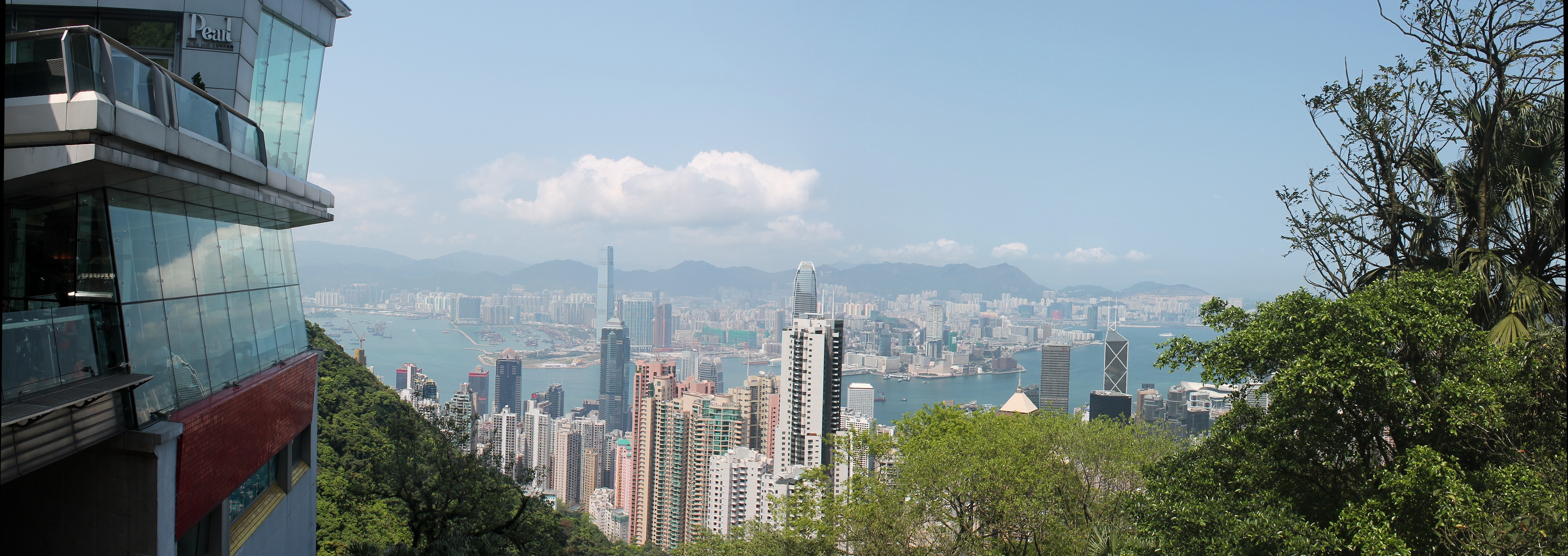
View of the Mountains of Kowloon from Hong Kong Island

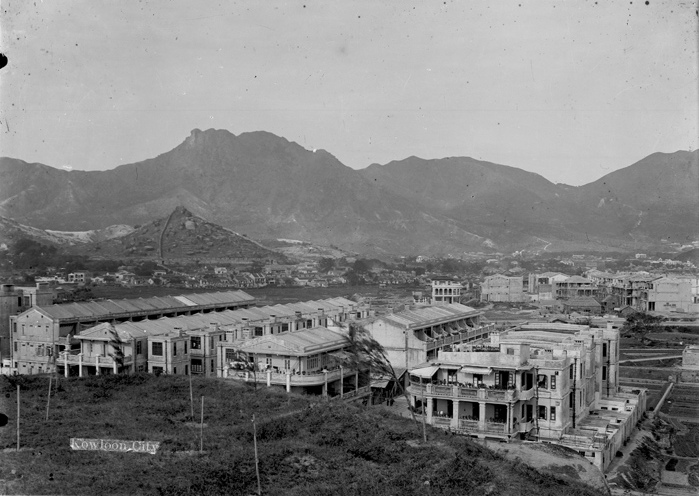
Kowloon City in front of Lion Rock and other Mountains of Kowloon

The Eight Mountains of Kowloon (Chinese: 九龍群山) are eight prominent mountains in Hong Kong that serve as a natural border between the Kowloon area and the New Territories. The eight mountains are: Kowloon Peak, Tung Shan, Tate's Cairn, Temple Hill, Unicorn Ridge, Lion Rock, Beacon Hill and Crow's Nest.

Incidentally, the name Kowloon stems from the term nine (kow) dragons (loon) (Chinese: 九龍), alluding to the eight mountains plus a Chinese emperor, the Emperor Bing of Song, who had fled to Hong Kong after being targeted by Mongol troops. In Ancient China, the Emperor used to be revered like a dragon and was the only person who could wear robes depicting a dragon.

== See also ==
- List of mountains, peaks and hills in Hong Kong
- Wilson Trail
- Gin Drinker's Line
