= Tate's Cairn =

Mountain in Hong Kong

- 大老山
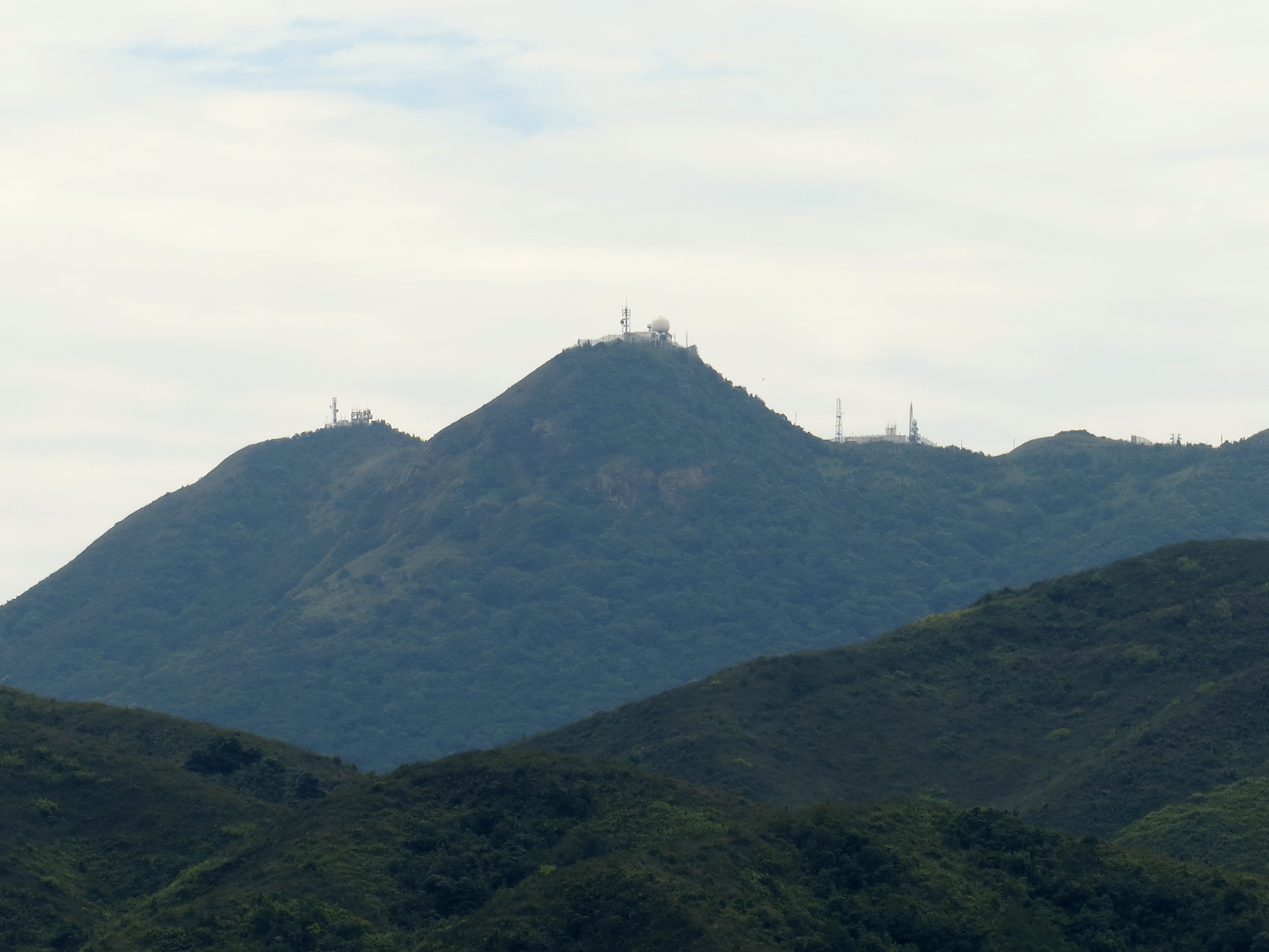
- Tate's Cairn, viewed from the north. Tate's Cairn Meteorological Station is at the centre.

Highest point
- Elevation: 583 m (1,913 ft); HKPD
- Coordinates: 22°21′28.78″N 114°13′3.85″E

Geography
- Location within Hong Kong
- Location: Hong Kong

Tate's Cairn or Tai Lo Shan (Chinese: 大老山; lit. 'Big Brother Mountain') is a mountain in Hong Kong at 583 metres (1,913 ft) in height. It is one of the peaks of the Kowloon Ridge and falls within Ma On Shan Country Park. The peak began to appear on colonial maps in the 1860s but remained unnamed until the beginning of the 20th century.

== Background ==
The origins of the peak's English name is unknown, but it may originate from maps created by a surveyor named George Passman Tate, Assistant Superintendent of Indian Survey Department who is responsible for government maps of Hong Kong and New Territories in 1899 and 1900.

Built in 1991 at a cost of HK$2 billion, Tate's Cairn Tunnel is a 3.9 kilometres (2.4 mi)-long twin-tube vehicular tunnel running north–south beneath the peak.

The Stage 4 to 5 transition of the MacLehose Trail is located beneath the Cairn.

== Weather radar ==
The first Hong Kong Observatory weather radar was installed at Tate's Cairn in 1959 at approximately 580 metres (1,900 ft) above sea level. It was a Decca 41 X-band radar. The antenna was exposed and reduced the radar's effectiveness during heavy rain or high winds. In 1966, the second weather radar, Plessey 43S, was also installed at Tate's Cairn next to the Decca 41. The second weather radar was protected by radome and could detect storms up to 450 kilometres (280 mi) away.

In 1983, the Decca 41 radar was replaced by a digital weather radar which enabled image archival and displayed rainfall intensity in different colours. During Typhoon Wayne's second approach to Hong Kong in 1986, the weather radar was damaged by lightning strike but was quickly repaired.

In 1994, the third radar, which is the first Doppler radar in Hong Kong, was installed here, with a detection range of 500 kilometres (310 mi). It worked in tandem with the second Doppler radar installed at Tai Mo Shan in 1999.

The current S band dual-polarization radar, the fourth radar at this location, was installed in early 2015 to replace the old Doppler radar at a cost of $19 million.

== Climate ==
Climate data for Tate's Cairn, elevation 572 m (1,877 ft), (2007–2020)
Month	Jan	Feb	Mar	Apr	May	Jun	Jul	Aug	Sep	Oct	Nov	Dec	Year
Mean daily maximum °C (°F)	14.9 (58.8)	16.1 (61.0)	18.3 (64.9)	21.7 (71.1)	24.7 (76.5)	26.7 (80.1)	27.9 (82.2)	28.0 (82.4)	26.5 (79.7)	23.6 (74.5)	20.2 (68.4)	16.2 (61.2)	22.1 (71.7)
Daily mean °C (°F)	11.9 (53.4)	12.9 (55.2)	15.3 (59.5)	18.8 (65.8)	22.0 (71.6)	24.0 (75.2)	24.8 (76.6)	24.7 (76.5)	23.5 (74.3)	20.8 (69.4)	17.3 (63.1)	13.1 (55.6)	19.1 (66.4)
Mean daily minimum °C (°F)	9.4 (48.9)	10.7 (51.3)	13.1 (55.6)	16.8 (62.2)	20.3 (68.5)	22.3 (72.1)	22.8 (73.0)	22.6 (72.7)	21.6 (70.9)	18.8 (65.8)	15.2 (59.4)	10.6 (51.1)	17.0 (62.6)
Average precipitation mm (inches)	44.0 (1.73)	44.3 (1.74)	77.9 (3.07)	143.3 (5.64)	338.3 (13.32)	602.7 (23.73)	389.6 (15.34)	454.2 (17.88)	336.6 (13.25)	145.6 (5.73)	53.7 (2.11)	35.3 (1.39)	2,665.5 (104.93)
Average relative humidity (%)	82.8	87.8	89.9	92.1	93.5	94.7	92.8	91.9	89.5	85.3	83.7	77.3	88.4
Source: Hong Kong Observatory (humidity 1999-2020)

== See also ==
- Gin Drinkers Line
- Gilwell Campsite
- Fei Ngo Shan Road
- Eight Mountains of Kowloon
