= Clear Water Bay Road =

Street in Hong Kong

Coordinates: 22.33456°N 114.22966°E

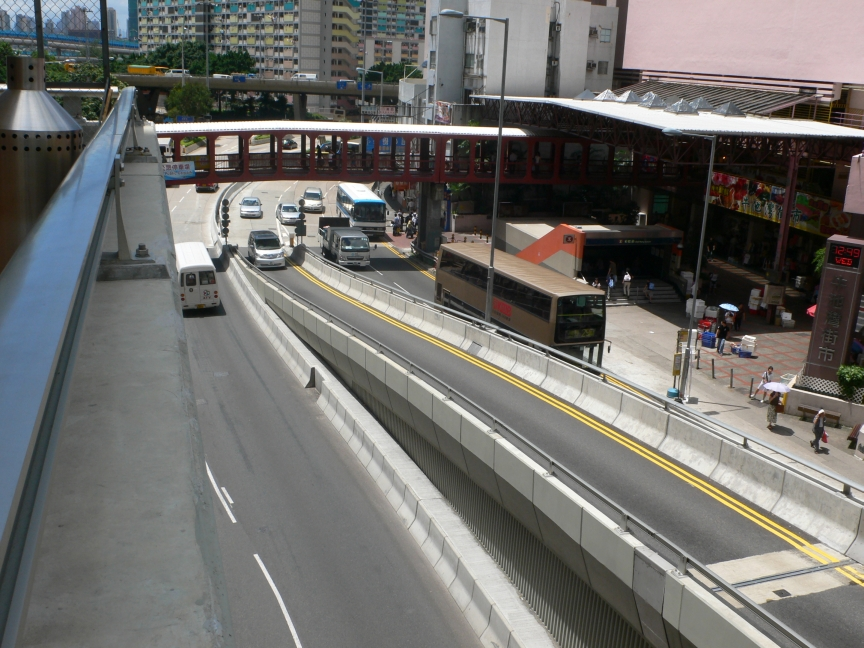
- The Start of Clear Water Bay Road in Ngau Chi Wan in August 2006.
- Interactive map of Clear Water Bay Road
- Length: 14.2 km (8.8 mi)
- South end: Clear Water Bay Country Park
- Major junctions: Hiram's Highway
- North end: Lung Cheung Road

Construction
- Completion: 1932; 94 years ago

Clear Water Bay Road (Chinese: 清水灣道) is a major road from Choi Hung Interchange in Ngau Chi Wan to Clear Water Bay, Sai Kung District. It also is a route to Sai Kung Town and Tseung Kwan O via Hiram's Highway and Hang Hau Road / Ying Yip Road respectively. An expressway deviation, New Clear Water Bay Road (新清水灣道), bypasses a steep, winding, 1 in 6 alignment of Clear Water Bay Road near Shun Lee and Fei Ngo Shan.

In 1932, Clear Water Bay Road began from Kowloon City. In 1963, part of the road was renamed Choi Hung Road and Prince Edward Road East.

== Description ==
Clear Water Bay Road begins at Ngau Chi Wan at the junction with Lung Cheung Road, Prince Edward Road East and Kwun Tong Road near MTR Choi Hung station. It then is bypassed by the newer deviation, running past Choi Wan Estate and Fei Ngo Shan south of Kowloon Peak and reaches Cha Liu Au (茶寮凹). It then merges with the new road then continues as a four-lane expressway east to Tseng Lan Shue, Pak Shek Wo (白石窩) and Pik Uk and runs downhill to Tai Po Tsai. There is an interchange to Sai Kung with the Hiram's Highway. It continues southward toward the Clear Water Bay Peninsula and junctions Ying Yip Road and Hang Hau Road (to Tseung Kwan O) at a complex roundabout near Silverstrand. The road continues south-east to Sheung Sze Wan, and reaches Tai Au Mun. The road ends south in Tai Hang Tun (大坑墩).

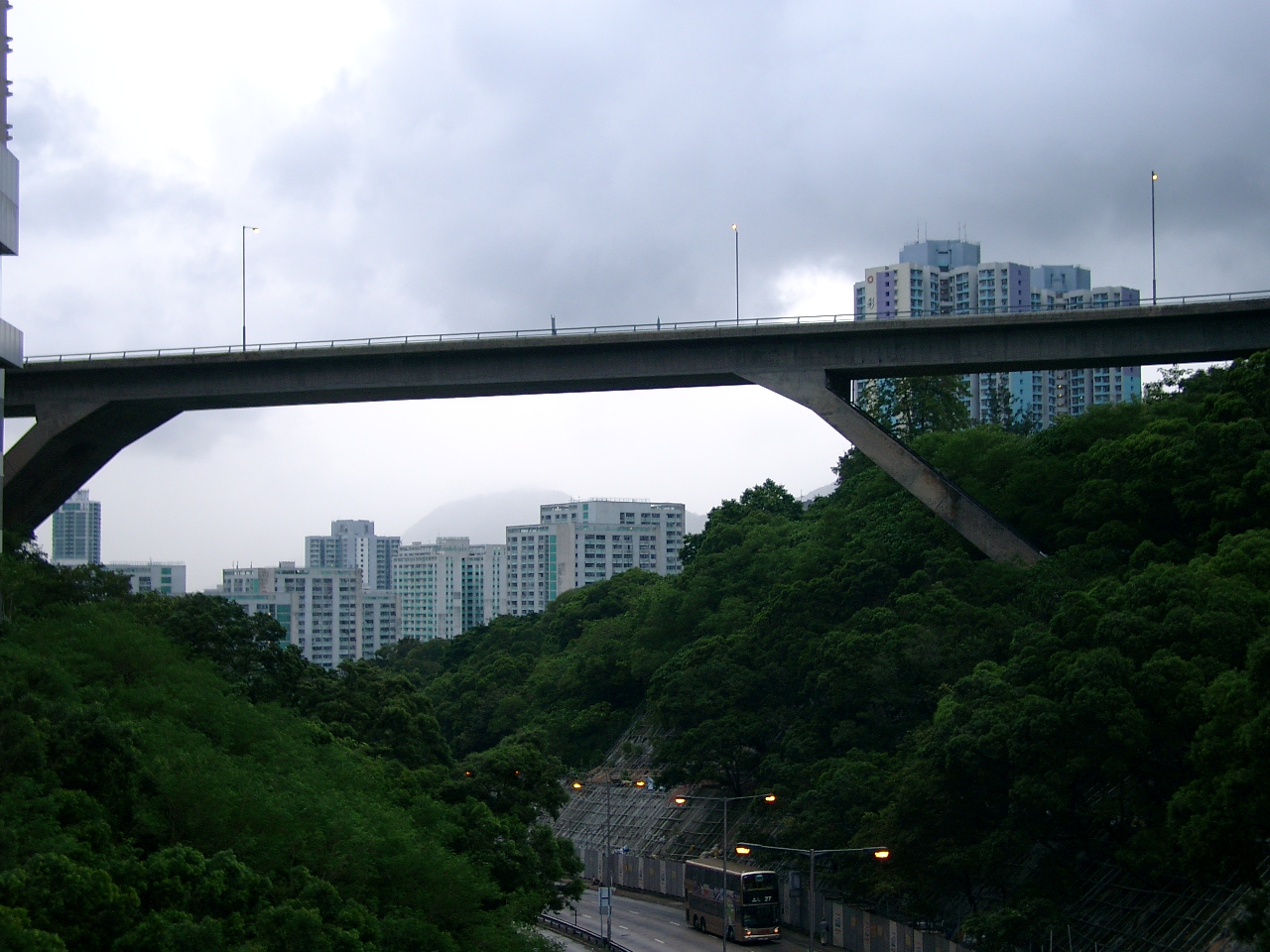
The spiral loop of New Clear Water Bay Road in August 2006

=== New Clear Water Bay Road ===
New Clear Water Bay Road is an expressway deviation of Clear Water Bay Road in Kowloon near Choi Wan Estate and Shun Lee Estate. For the section below Kowloon Peak, Clear Water Bay Road is very steep and reaches the ratio of 1 in 6 It is difficult for buses ascending the incline. With the ever-increasing usage of the road due to population increases and the establishment of a country park in Sai Kung, the Hong Kong Government decided to build a new expressway diverging from the junction near Choi Wan Estate, then junctions with Shun Lee Tsuen Road at Shun Lee, then loops back over itself to climb the steep hill and then rejoins the original road at the junction with Anderson Road near Cha Liu Au. The new road was completed in 1980. The loop flyover runs from the hill north of Jordan Valley to Kowloon Peak, and it was the highest bridge in Hong Kong at that time.

== Intersections ==
District	Location	km	mi	Destinations	Notes
Sai Kung		0.0	0.0	Clear Water Bay Country Park	Cul-de-sac
Sai Kung		1.3	0.81	Lung Ha Wan Road	
Sai Kung		1.4	0.87	Tai Au Mun Road	Roundabout
Sai Kung		1.7	1.1	Sheung Sze Wan Road	
Sai Kung		1.9	1.2	Ha Yeung San Tsuen Road	
Sai Kung		2.2	1.4	Leung Fai Tin Lower Road	
Sai Kung		2.3	1.4	Leang Fai Tin Upper Road	
Sai Kung		2.5	1.6	Ha Yeung Road	
Sai Kung		3.0	1.9	Pak To Avenue	
Sai Kung		3.5	2.2	Pan Lo Wan Road	
Sai Kung		4.2	2.6	Hang Hau Wing Lung Road	
Sai Kung		4.9	3.0	Mang Kung Uk Road	
Sai Kung	Hang Hau	5.1	3.2	Pik Sha Road	
Sai Kung	Hang Hau	5.4	3.4	Silver Cape Road	
Sai Kung	Hang Hau	5.8	3.6	Hang Hau Road / Ying Yip Road / Silverstrand Beach Road	Roundabout
Sai Kung		6.7	4.2	A Kung Wan Road	
Sai Kung		7.0	4.3	Ngan Ying Road	
Sai Kung		8.0	5.0	University Road	Roundabout
Sai Kung		8.2– 8.6	5.1– 5.3	Hiram's Highway	Directional-T interchange
Sai Kung	Pik Uk	9.7	6.0	Razor Hill Road	
Sai Kung	Pik Uk	10.0	6.2	Pak Shek Toi Road	Westbound only
Sai Kung	Tseng Lan Shue	10.4	6.5	Pak Shek Wo Shan Tsuen Road	
Sai Kung	Tseng Lan Shue	10.5	6.5	Ka Shue Road	Eastbound only
Sai Kung	Tseng Lan Shue	10.6	6.6	Kam Shue Road	Westbound only
Sai Kung	Tseng Lan Shue	11.1	6.9	Tan Shan Road	Eastbound only
Sai Kung–Kwun Tong district border	Jordan Valley	11.9	7.4	On Sau Road	
Sai Kung–Kwun Tong district border	Jordan Valley	12.1	7.5	New Clear Water Bay Road	
Sai Kung–Kwun Tong district border	Jordan Valley	12.3	7.6	Fei Ngo Shan Road	
Kwun Tong–Wong Tai Sin district border	Jordan Valley	12.6	7.8	New Clear Water Bay Road	Westbound lane to eastbound New Clear Water Bay Road
Kwun Tong–Wong Tai Sin district border	Jordan Valley	13.0	8.1	Jat's Incline	
Wong Tai Sin	Ngau Chi Wan	13.3	8.3	Fung Shing Street	
Kwun Tong–Wong Tai Sin district border	Ngau Chi Wan	13.7	8.5	New Clear Water Bay Road	
Wong Tai Sin	Ngau Chi Wan	14.2	8.8	Lung Cheung Road to Route 7	
1.000 mi = 1.609 km; 1.000 km = 0.621 mi: Incomplete access

== See also ==
- List of streets and roads in Hong Kong
- 8 Clearwater Bay Road
