= Buffalo Hill =

Buffalo Hill may refer to:

- Buffalo Hill, California, an unincorporated community in El Dorado County, California
- Buffalo Hill (Hong Kong), a hill in Ma On Shan Country Park, Hong Kong
