= MacLehose Trail =

Hiking trail that crosses the New Territories, Hong Kong

MacLehose Trail 麥理浩徑
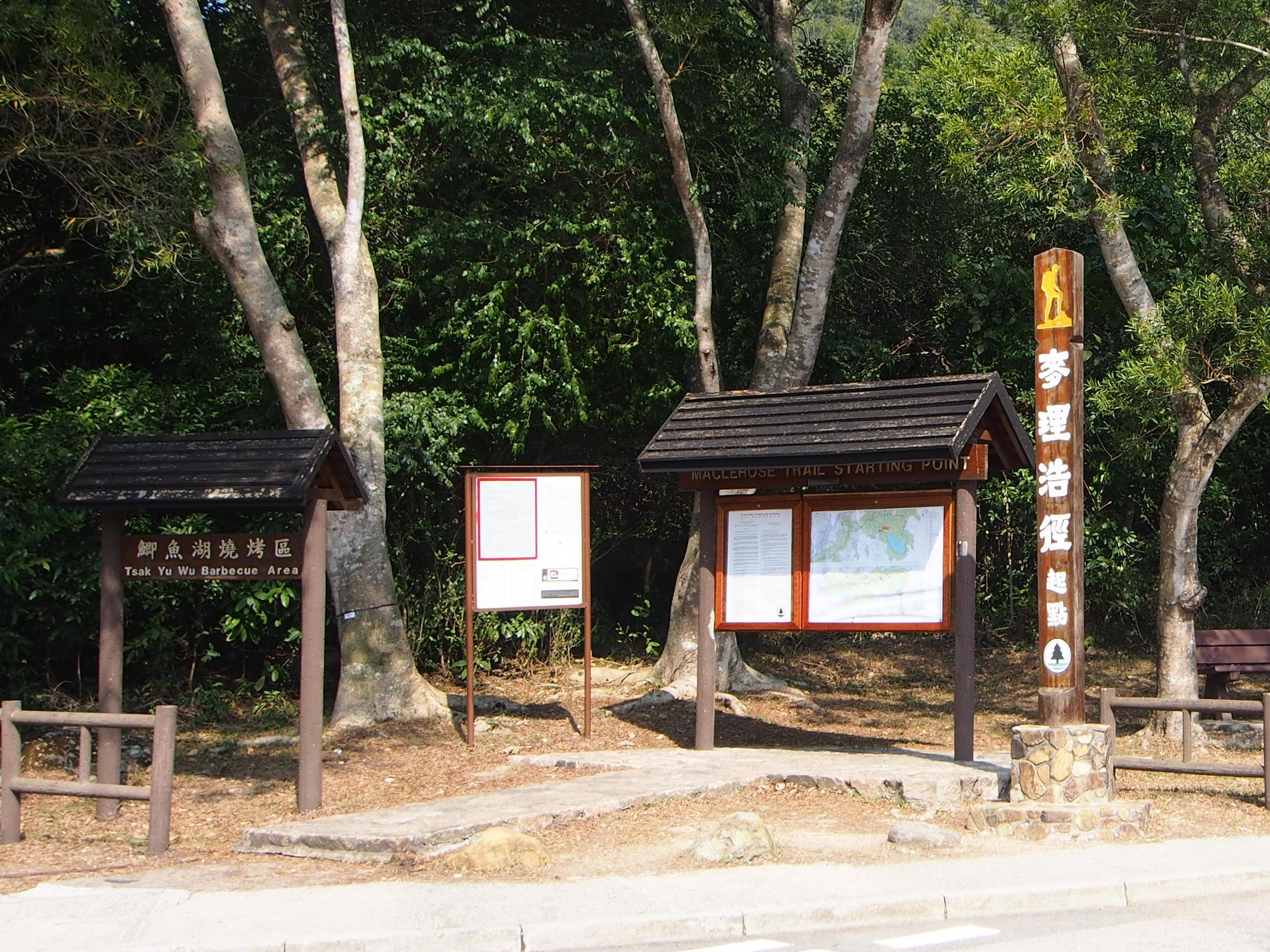
- Starting point of the MacLehose Trail
- Length: 100 kilometres (62 miles)
- Location: New Territories, Hong Kong
- Trailheads: Pak Tam Chung, Sai Kung District; Tuen Mun, Tuen Mun District
- Use: Hiking
- Highest point: Tai Mo Shan (957 m (3,140 ft))
- Lowest point: sea level
- Difficulty: Difficult
- Season: all year
- Sights: Hong Kong UNESCO Global Geopark; Tai Lam Chung Reservoir

Map overview

MacLehose Trail
- Traditional Chinese: 麥理浩徑
- Simplified Chinese: 麦理浩径
Transcriptions
Standard Mandarin
- Hanyu Pinyin: Màilǐhào Jìng
Yue: Cantonese
- Yale Romanization: Mahk léih houh ging
- Jyutping: Mak6 lei5 hou6 ging3

The MacLehose Trail is a 100-kilometre (62 mi) hiking trail that crosses much of the New Territories, Hong Kong, starting from Pak Tam Chung, Sai Kung District in the east to Tuen Mun Town, Tuen Mun District in the west. It is the longest trail in Hong Kong and the path is marked by distance posts at 500-metre intervals. The trail is named after Murray MacLehose, Baron MacLehose of Beoch, the longest-serving governor of Hong Kong, who established the Country Parks and was himself an enthusiastic hiker. The trail passes through a variety of natural scenery including beaches and mountains.

The MacLehose Trail starts in Pak Tam Chung, then weaves its way anticlockwise around the Sai Kung peninsula. It then hugs the Sai Kung district border with Sha Tin, until it meets the mountains separating Kowloon and the New Territories. The trail proceeds along the mountain range, culminating in an ascent up to the highest point in Hong Kong, Tai Mo Shan. The trail then winds its way to Tuen Mun in the western end of the New Territories, following a catchwater for much of its last section.

== History ==
In the 1970s, the Hong Kong Government, spearheaded by Sir Murray MacLehose, moved to protect Hong Kong's countryside and open it up for recreation. The first step towards the creation of country parks was the approval of a $33 million, five-year plan for "recreational development" in 1972, which included the provisioning of equipment such as picnic tables, litter bins, and barbecue pits. The Director of Agriculture and Fisheries, E. H. "Ted" Nichols, announced in July 1975 that the Government planned on passing legislation to give country parks statutory status. As part of the plan, "Nature Trails" were proposed to "maximize understanding and consequent enjoyment of the countryside". The Country Parks Ordinance was enacted and came into effect in 1976, and the Country Parks Board was formed shortly thereafter. The Department of Agriculture and Fisheries under Nichols "joined up village paths and grass cutters' tracks" to form a trail extending from Mirs Bay to Castle Peak, and Nichols named the trail after MacLehose and his wife, both avid ramblers. After nine months' work, the MacLehose Trail was officially opened on 26 October 1979 by MacLehose and Nichols. The trail opened with 12 campsites along its route, equipped with simple toilet facilities and barbecue pits.

Only days after the opening, the trail was marred by fires that broke out due to the reckless use of joss sticks by grave-sweepers on Chung Yeung Festival. Parts of the Tai Lam Country Park were badly burnt and said to take at least five years to regrow.

The MacLehose Trail was instantly popular with long-distance hikers; multiple attempts were made to complete the 100-kilometer trail in under a day. The first reported sub-24-hour record was achieved on 13 November 1979 by two British Army workmates, who completed the trail in 22 hours 25 minutes. The record was beaten not a month later by eleven locals; the fastest runner having traversed the trail in 18 hours 28 minutes. Numerous attempts have been made since then; the record as of May 2021 of 10 hours, 38 minutes, 8 seconds was set by Wong Ho-Chung, one of Hong Kong's best ultramarathon runners, on 4 December 2020.

Isolated incidents of robbery happen infrequently on quieter parts of the trail. Hikers have been advised not to attempt the trail on their own, especially at night. On 23 November 1980, a group of 24 hikers were robbed when three of them were held at knifepoint. In 2018, a mainland Chinese man was sentenced to seven years' imprisonment for serial robbery on hiking paths, including the MacLehose Trail at Ma On Shan. Emergency phones maintained by PCCW are dotted along the trail, and mobile network coverage is good virtually throughout.

The MacLehose Trail celebrated its 40th anniversary on 26 October 2019, with the Agriculture, Fisheries and Conservation Department (AFCD) holding celebratory events in Shing Mun Country Park, through which Sections 6 and 7 run. Events included treetop ropes courses, a hiking challenge up Needle Hill, guided war relic tours, and children's free play activities. Chan Yat-fong, veteran hiking organiser and trailblazer, and Stephen Chu, TV personality and avid hiker, both spoke at a talk organised by the AFCD for the occasion.

== Route description ==
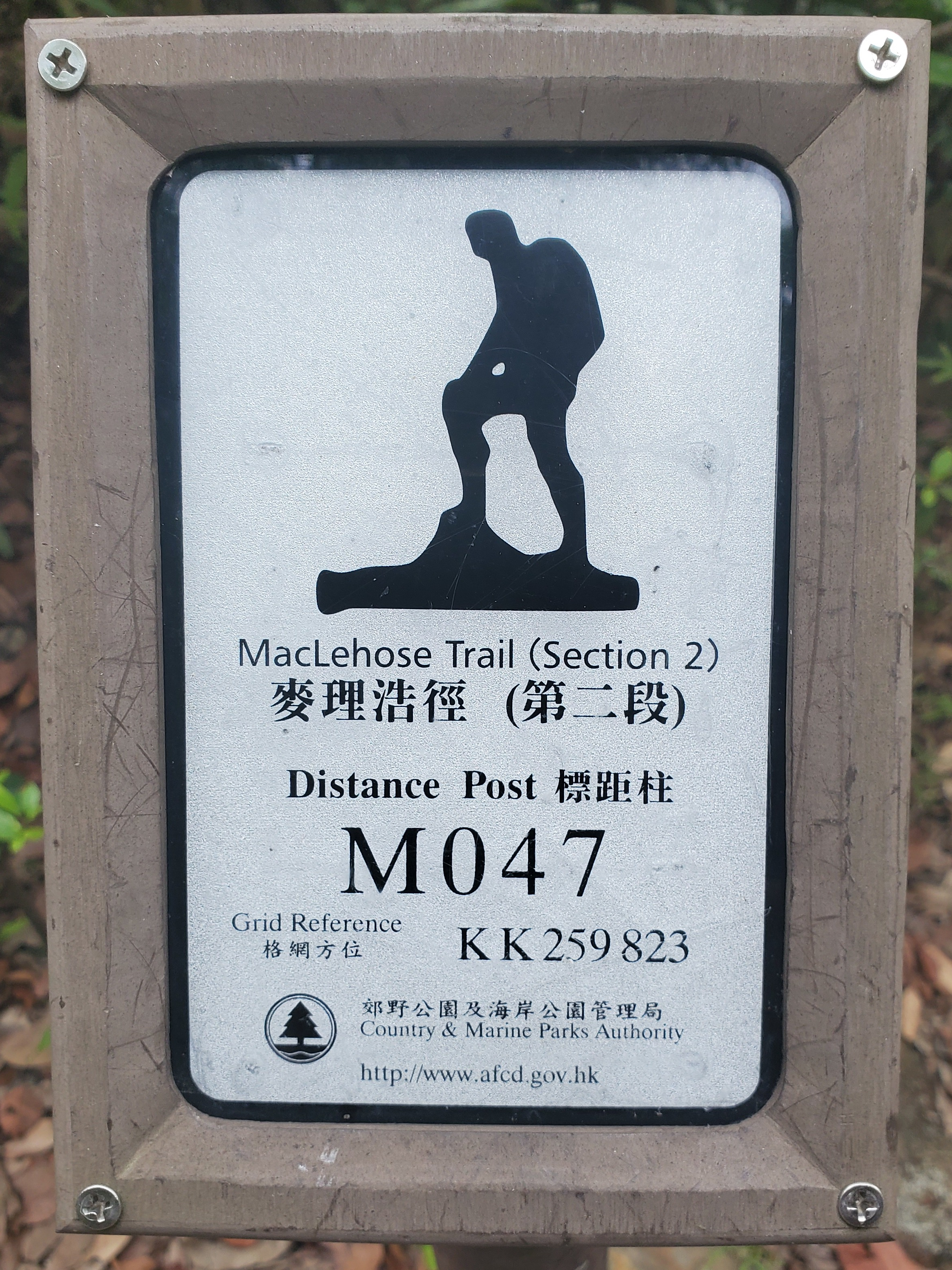
Distance post

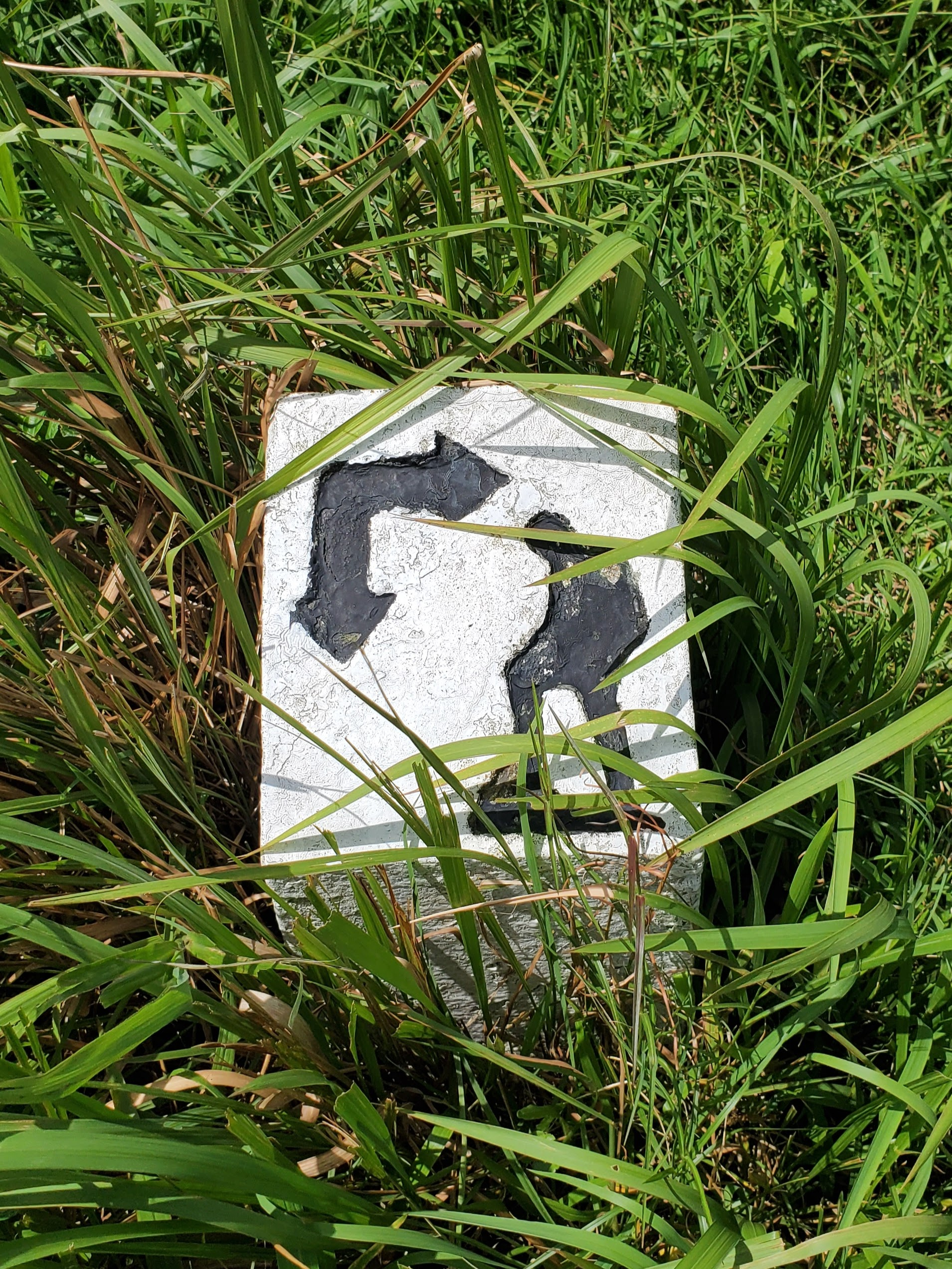
Stone marker

The MacLehose Trail is marked by two hundred numbered distance posts at 500-metre intervals, ranging from M001 to M200. Fingerposts and stone pillars mark the trail at junctions with other major hiking routes. In addition to their respective post numbers, distance posts indicate their trail section, grid reference number, and the AFCD website, all information which can assist hikers in communicating their location to relevant authorities in an emergency. The most prominent feature is arguably the distinctive logo for the MacLehose Trail: the silhouette of a young backpacker with one leg on a rock, hands resting on their knee, facing towards the left. The logo was designed by Tong King-sum, a famous local sculptor who once worked as a civil servant in the AFCD. Lord MacLehose commented that the logo "immortalise[d him] as the perpetrator of intense fatigue in exhausted bodies under heavy loads on semi-perpendicular slopes", but others have described it as "aesthetically beautiful". Early stone markers were individually carved by workers, resulting in slightly varied designs of the silhouette.

The MacLehose Trail is divided into ten sections of varying lengths and difficulties, as shown in the table below:

Sections of the MacLehose Trail
Section	Route	Length (km)	Time (hr)	Difficulty	Starting Post	Ending Post
1	Pak Tam Chung → Long Ke	10.6	2.5	1/5 stars	M000	M020/M021
2	Long Ke → Pak Tam Au	13.5	4.0	4/5 stars	M020/M021	M048/M049
3	Pak Tam Au → Kei Ling Ha	9	2.5	3/5 stars	M048/M049	M068/M069
4	Kei Ling Ha → Tai Lo Shan	12.7	4.0	4/5 stars	M068/M069	M094
5	Tai Lo Shan → Tai Po Road	10.6	2.5	3/5 stars	M094	M115/M116
6	Tai Po Road → Shing Mun	4.6	1.0	1/5 stars	M115/M116	M124
7	Shing Mun → Lead Mine Pass	6.2	2.5	4/5 stars	M124	M137
8	Lead Mine Pass → Route Twisk	9.7	4.0	4/5 stars	M137	M156
9	Route Twisk → Tin Fu Tsai	6.3	2.5	2/5 stars	M156	M168/M169
10	Tin Fu Tsai → Tuen Mun Town	15.6	4.0	2/5 stars	M168/M169	M200

Easy
Moderate
Demanding
Difficult
Very Difficult

=== Sai Kung ===
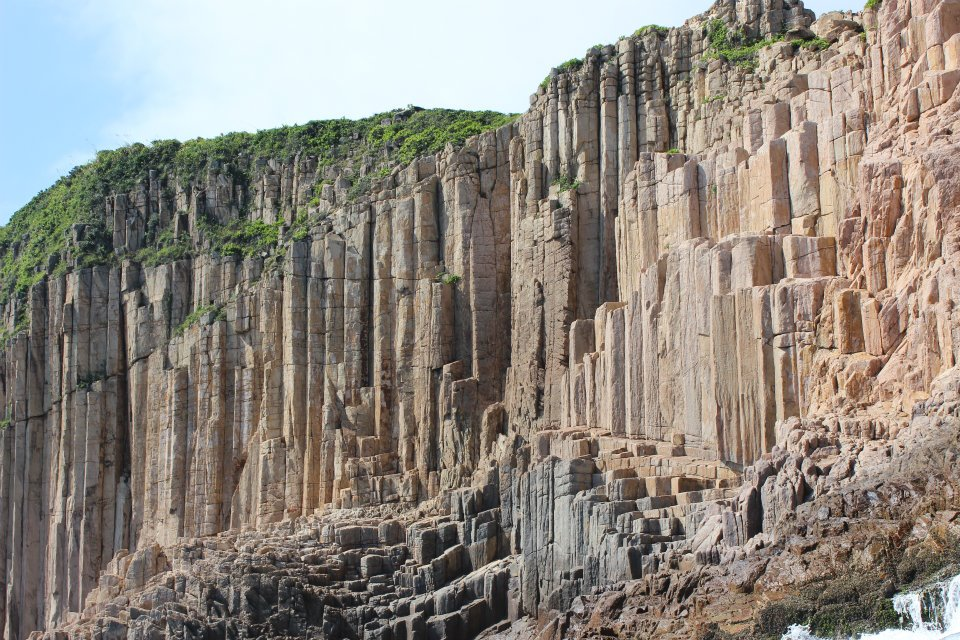
Hexagonal columnar jointing

Section 1 starts at the junction between Tai Mong Tsai Road and Pak Tam Road, around 500m due northeast from the Pak Tam Chung carpark, bus terminus, and visitor centre. The trail ascends along Tai Mong Tsai Road and continues along Sai Kung Man Yee Road, on the south side of the High Island Reservoir. About 4km from the start, the trail crosses the western dam of the reservoir, providing an expansive view over Kau Sai Chau, Chong Hing Water Sports Centre and Yuet Ming Pavilion. The pavilion was built on what was the High Island Detention Centre, which processed Vietnamese boat people from 1989 to 1998. Continuing onto High Island itself, minor trails branch off towards coastal villages, serving as their only land-based connection to the rest of Sai Kung. One such village is Pak Lap, a Hakka village with more than 300 years of history and home to a small, idyllic campsite. Another village, Tung A, houses one of the oldest surviving Tin Hau temples in Hong Kong. Other villages on the northern shore of High Island were flooded during the construction of the reservoir, displacing four hundred Hakka villagers. The trail leaves High Island onto the East Dam, where visitors are able to view hexagonal columnar jointing of volcanic tuff, an integral part of the UNESCO Global Geopark. Other attractions in the vicinity include the dolosse wall lining the East Dam, a wooden boardwalk overlooking a sea cave, and a sea stack of hexagonal columns at Po Pin Chau. A blue monument in the shape of a dolos stands at the southern end of the dam, commemorating those who died in the construction of the High Island Reservoir. Section 1 ends 800m away from the East Dam near Long Ke, 90m above sea level.

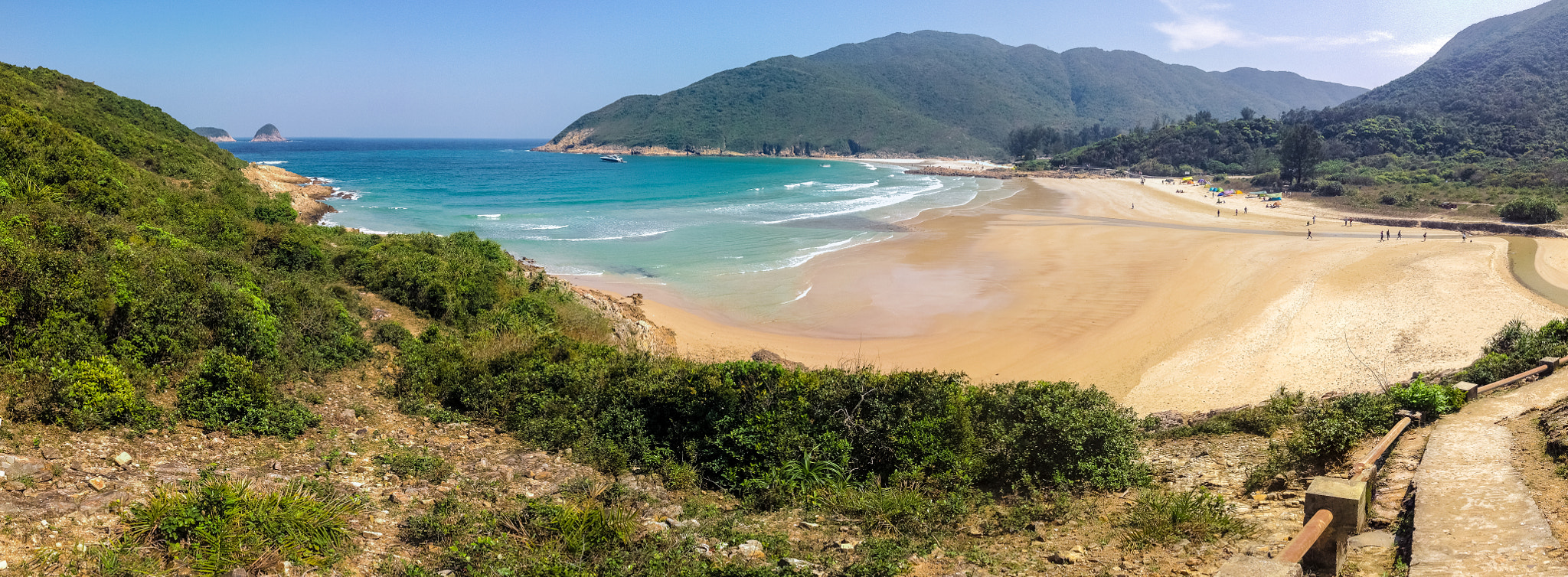
Sai Wan Beach

Section 2 starts with a short section along the distinctive Long Ke coastline, which is formed by jagged columns of rhyolite. The trail then takes a steep ascent up Sai Wan Shan (Sai Kung), an exposed route without any shade — the Government Flying Service on one day in September 1999 took off seven times to rescue 17 heatstroke victims from this area. However, at the peak, hikers are rewarded with a clear view over the Sai Kung coastline and of Sharp Peak to the north. Sharp Peak, true to its name, is one of the Three Sharp Peaks of Hong Kong, known for its difficulty from steepness and remoteness. The trail gradually snakes down to a crossroads at Chui Tung Au. A clear, concreted-over path here leads to Sai Kung Sai Wan Road, where private minibus services are available. Veering right at Chui Tung Au, the main trail reaches sea level at Sai Wan Beach, a popular campsite with toilet facilities and small stores. Visitors are able to enjoy panoramic views over Sai Wan and the two outcropping islands of Tai Chau and Tsim Chau; campers in particular have unobstructed visibility of the sunrise over the South China Sea. Leaving Sai Wan Beach, the trail weaves along the coastline of Tai Long Wan until it reaches Ham Tin, a small fishing village. The trail climbs a small hill to reach Tai Long Au and crosses the Sai Kung/Tai Po administrative border, before descending westwards to sea level at Chek Keng, where kai-to services to Wong Shek and Wan Tsai are available. This is followed by a gradual ascent towards Pak Tam Au, where Section 2 ends. Public transport, toilet facilities, and a water refilling station are available here.

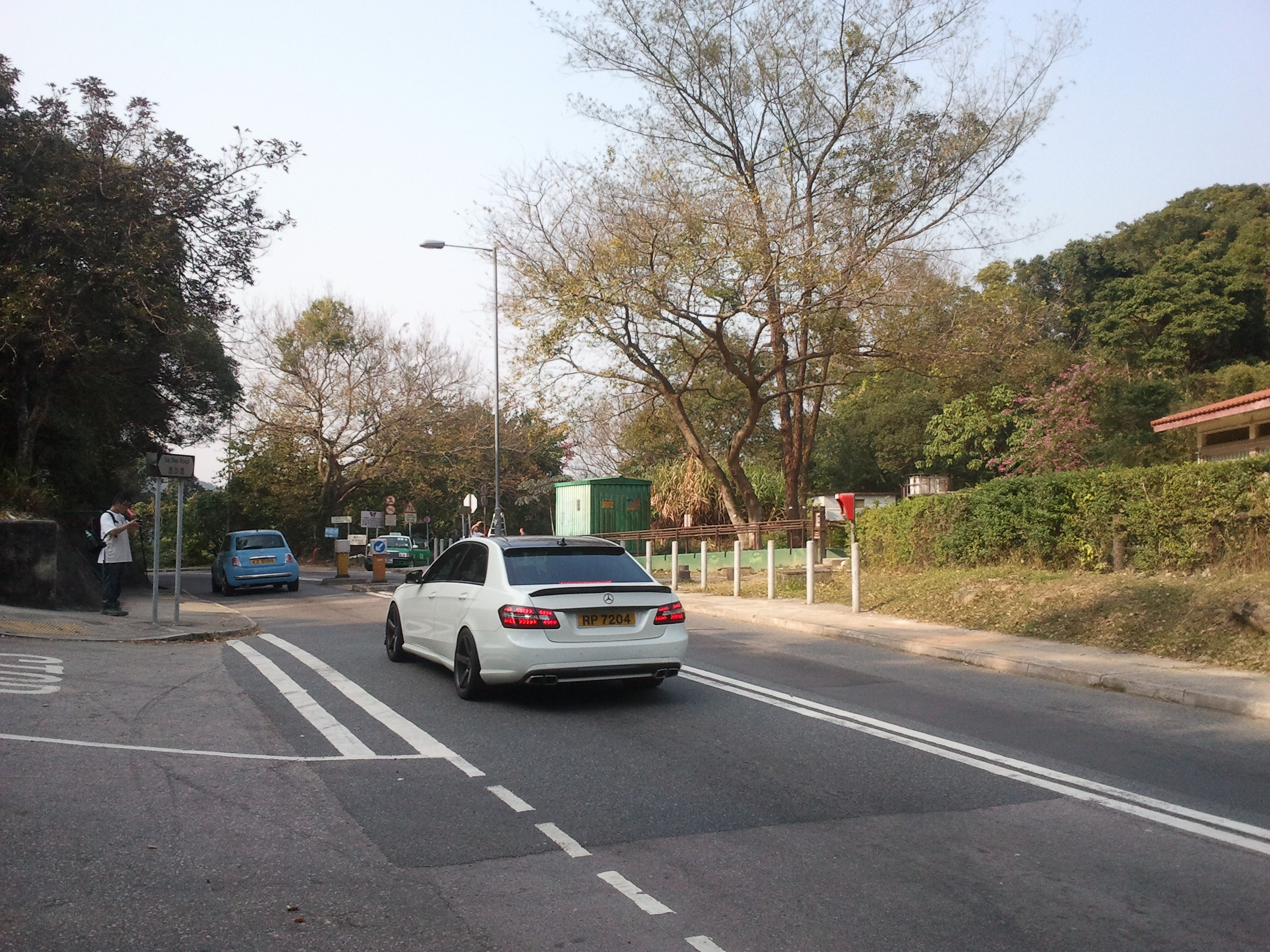
Endpoint of Section 3 at Shui Long Wo

Section 3 leaves Pak Tam Road to enter the Sai Kung West Country Park. Hikers are immediately faced with a steep ascent up Ngau Yee Shek Shan, 425m above sea level. Section 3 is often said to be one of the toughest parts of the MacLehose Trail, due to its "undulating mountains" and "steep gradients"— however, hikers are rewarded with an unobstructed view over Tolo Harbour, Tai Po, and Ma On Shan throughout the first half of the Section. The trail continues westwards along the side of Ngam Tau Shan, descending gently towards Cheung Sheung plateau. This area once housed multiple villages in the 1960s, but many villagers have moved away since the industrialisation of Hong Kong during the 1970s. The area is now a small campsite, with a small store open on holidays, partially utilising the former village school's recreational area. The area was far-flung and hard to access, and was consequently one of the last rural settlements in Hong Kong. Wildlife like South China tigers, muntjacs, and wild boars were spotted, but soon declined in numbers due to deforestation by local Hakka villagers. Smaller animals such as pangolins and porcupines retreated into the remaining forests. From the campsite, the Cheung Sheung Country Trail provides an escape route via Jacob's Ladder to Yung Shue O. The MacLehose Trail continues southwards through the uplands of the Sai Kung peninsula, passing Wa Mei Shan and Lui Ta Shek. The trail then dips briefly into a small valley, before steeply ascending Kai Kung Shan. The view from the peak provides a 360-degree panorama over Three Fathoms Cove, Yim Tin Tsai, and other mountains in the Sai Kung West Country Park. Section 3 finishes by winding its way down to Kei Ling Ha and Sai Sha Road, the main thoroughfare connecting Ma On Shan and Sai Kung. There are toilets, water refilling stations, and multiple barbeque areas near the endpoint.

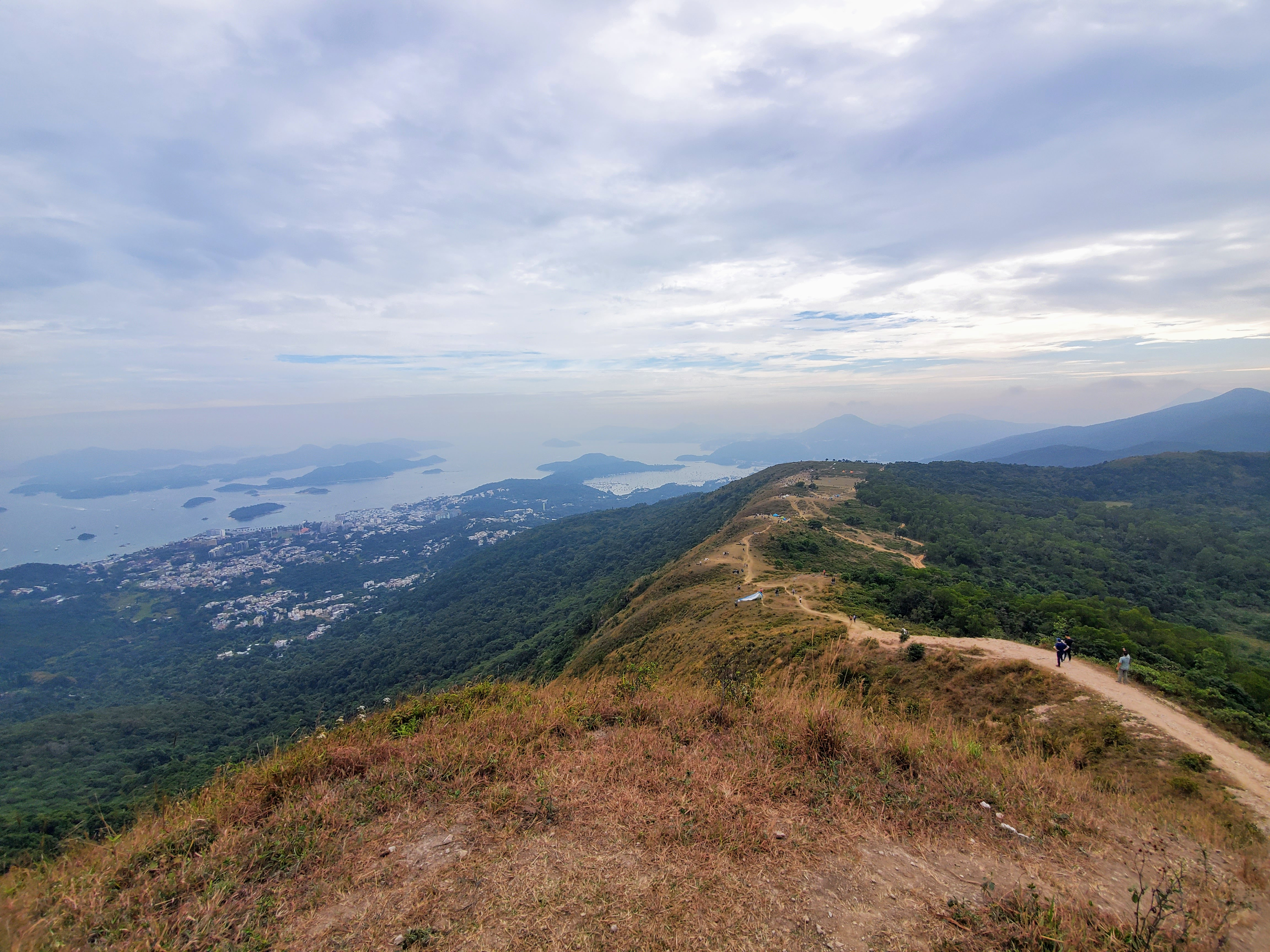
Ngong Ping Plateau

Section 4 traverses the Ma On Shan massif, connecting Ma On Shan Country Park with the mountains of Kowloon. The Section starts with a flight of concrete steps up to join the Kei Ling Ha Forest Track. 1.5 kilometres later, the trail merges with Chuk Yeung Road, a small road serving the now-abandoned village of Wong Chuk Yeung. The trail branches off onto a dirt path at distance post M073, providing views of Ma On Shan and Pyramid Hill. This is shortly followed by a sharp ascent up Ma On Shan itself — a section with steep drops either side of the path. The trail branches off to the south, around half a kilometre away from the summit. Skirting past Pyramid Hill, the path opens up onto the Ngong Ping plateau, offering expansive views over Sai Kung Town and Port Shelter. In addition to being a hotspot for paragliding, there is an official campsite on the plateau. The Ma On Shan Country Trail runs parallel with the MacLehose Trail along the plateau, and provides exit routes towards Ma On Shan Town and Sai Kung Town. Continuing along Section 4, the trail passes through woodlands before reaching Mau Ping, a resting area at the crossroads of various hiking routes. From here, the MacLehose Trail roughly forms the administrative boundary between Sha Tin and Sai Kung, proceeding southwards towards Buffalo Pass while commanding a view over Hebe Haven and the Hong Kong Marina. The trail then bypasses the twin peaks of Buffalo Hill and West Buffalo Hill, past which the mountains of Kowloon, especially Tate's Cairn, come into view. Section 4 concludes with a short climb towards Gilwell Campsite, a major campsite managed by the Scout Association of Hong Kong. The Section ends where it meets an access road, just outside the campsite grounds.

=== Central New Territories ===
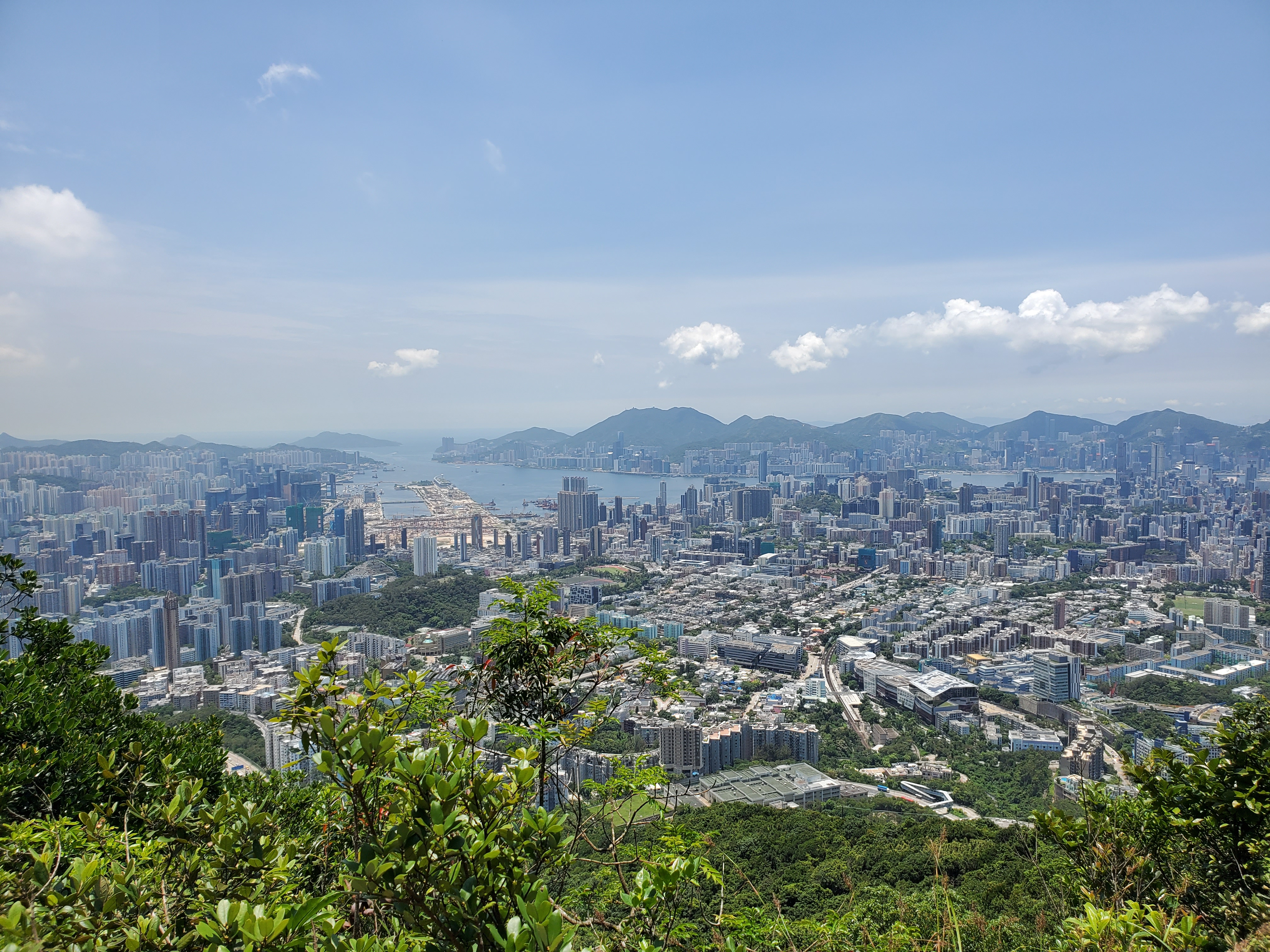
View south from Beacon Hill

Section 5 is the closest section to urban Kowloon, running westwards along the mountains separating New Kowloon and the New Territories. The mountains formed a natural physical barrier, unbroken until the original Beacon Hill Tunnel was built for the Kowloon-Canton Railway in 1910. Section 5 starts by briefly following the Gilwell Camp access road northbound, then sharply swerves left to lead onto a mountain trail, skirting Tate's Cairn. The path then joins Fei Ngo Shan Road near Jat's Incline Viewpoint, which provides panoramic views over urban Kowloon, Hong Kong Island, Victoria Harbour, Lei Yue Mun, and the old Kai Tak Airport. The trail from here runs along Shatin Pass Road, sharing the same route as Section 4 of the Wilson Trail until they reach Lion's Pavilion at Shatin Pass. A store at this crossroads act as an important refreshment point for hikers, but has in 2017 been prohibited by the Food and Environmental Hygiene Department from serving hot food, despite having operated since 1960. The MacLehose Trail then enters the Lion Rock Country Park and ascends Unicorn Ridge, passing just south of the summit. The trail continues westwards, reaching the Reunification Pavilion after bypassing the iconic Lion Rock along its northern slopes. From here, paved pathways down to Wang Tau Hom provide easy access from urban Kowloon. The last uphill section consists of a climb up Beacon Hill, on top of which a radar station for the Civil Aviation Department stands. Although the radar station is closed to visitors, its surroundings command an expansive view over Sha Tin and much of Kowloon. After descending from Beacon Hill, Section 5 ends with a flat section through Eagle's Nest, merging with the Eagle's Nest Nature Trail. The endpoint of Section 5 is on Piper's Hill Road, near the junction with Tai Po Road.

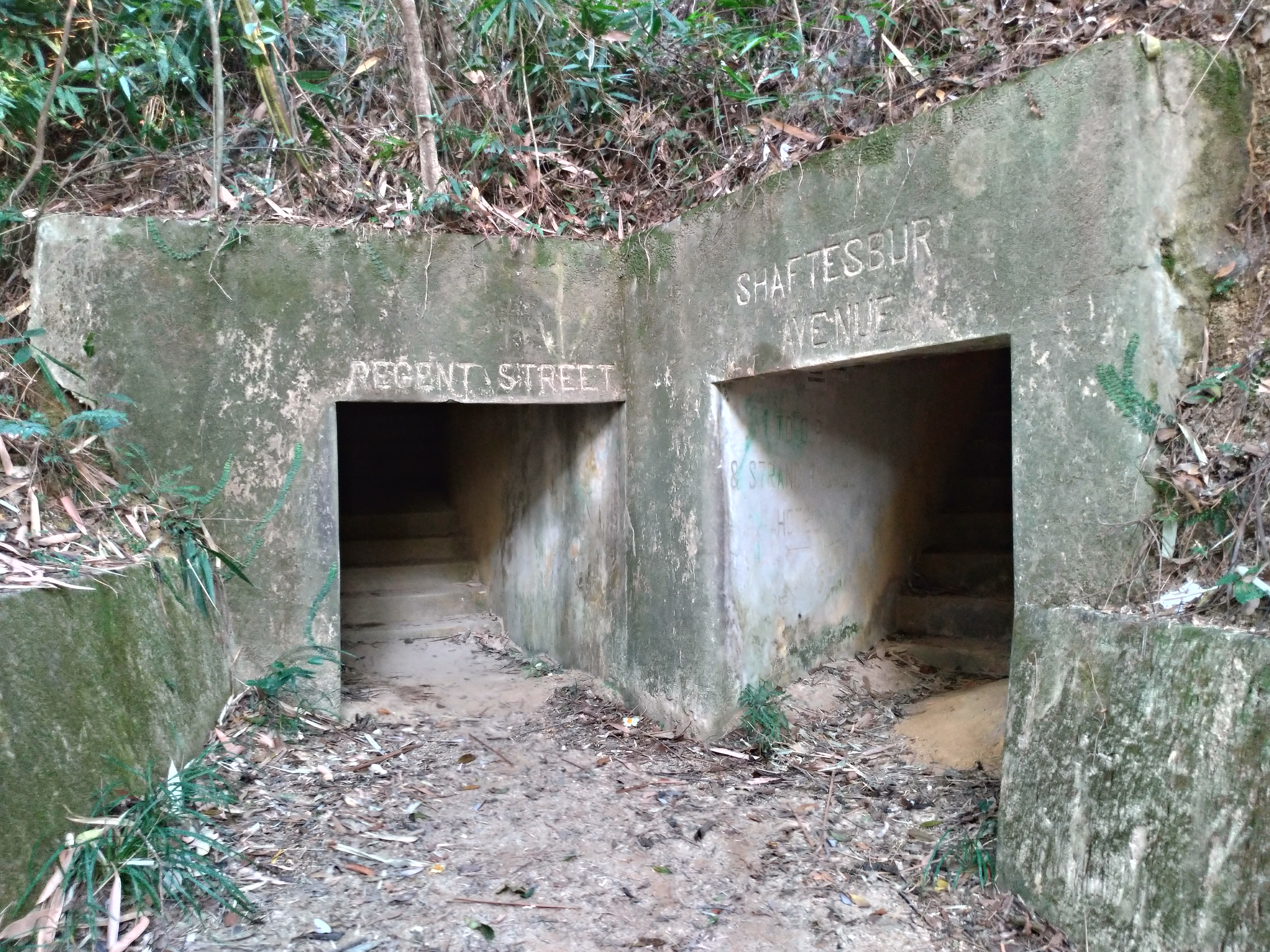
Shing Mun Redoubt tunnels

Section 6 is the shortest stage of the MacLehose Trail and runs chiefly through Kam Shan Country Park. The trail first crosses Tai Po Road on a footbridge and turns onto Golden Hill Road, an access road for the Kowloon Reservoirs, where groups of rhesus macaques can be seen. These monkeys were first introduced in Hong Kong to improve water safety by having them eat the narrow-flowered poison nut and umbel-flowered poison nut, native plants toxic to humans. Various structures of the Kowloon Reservoir are declared monuments, most of which date back to 1901. The MacLehose Trail continues northwards onto Smuggler's Ridge — an area full of historic relics and monuments from the Battle of Hong Kong, the most prominent of which is the remnants of the Gin Drinkers' Line. The tunnels of the Shing Mun Redoubt, an integral part of the Gin Drinkers' Line, still stand in good condition, bearing the names of major London thoroughfares such as Shaftesbury Avenue and Regent Street. The view from the Redoubt and the main hiking trail overlooks Tsuen Wan and Kwai Chung — both part of Tsuen Wan New Town, one of the older new towns developed in the early 1970s. Tai Mo Shan, the highest peak in Hong Kong, is also visible from this part of the trail. Section 6 ends by descending gently to Shing Mun Road on the edge of the Shing Mun Reservoir, where there are toilet facilities, a water refilling station, and a barbeque area. Hikers can leave the MacLehose Trail by turning left at Shing Mun Road and walking approximately 2 km to Lei Muk Shue, where public transport is available.

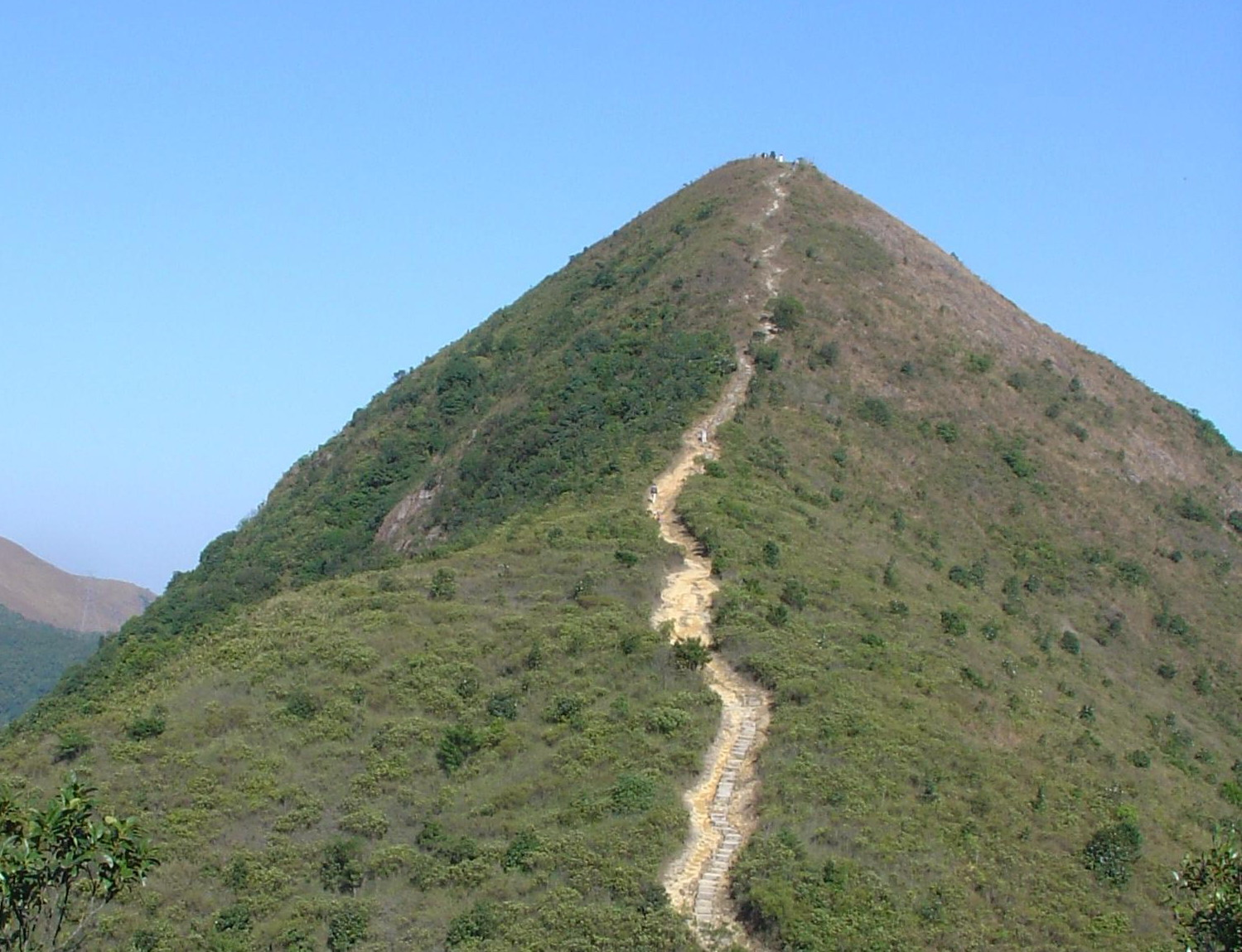
Needle Hill

Section 7 begins by following Shing Mun Road in the opposite direction, crossing the main dam of the Reservoir. The Reservoir itself was completed in 1937, many buildings of which is now of Grade I protected status. The construction of the dam necessitated the relocation of 855 villagers from eight Hakka villages, but provided Hong Kong with 13 million cubic metres of water storage capacity. The hiking trail braches off into a dirt path shortly after crossing the dam, marking the start of a steep ascent up Needle Hill, along the border between Tsuen Wan District and Sha Tin District. This is "one of the most notorious climbs on the whole 100km route", as scaling Needle Hill requires hikers to climb more than 1000 steps in less than 1.7 km, all with little to no shade. However, the view on the summit is expansive, despite Needle Hill standing only 532 m above sea level — to the east are panoramic views of Sha Tin New Town. In the opposite direction, the Shing Mun Reservoir, Tsuen Wan, and Kwai Chung are clearly visible. The trail continues northwards on a descent equally as steep as the preceding ascent, and joins the paved Shing Mun Forest Track near distance post M130. The route follows the track up to just before the summit of Grassy Hill, where views stretch as far as Ma On Shan on a clear day. Branching off into the forest, the trail descends westward towards Lead Mine Pass, where Section 7 ends — there is an official campsite close by, complete with barbeque pits and flushing toilets.

=== Western New Territories ===
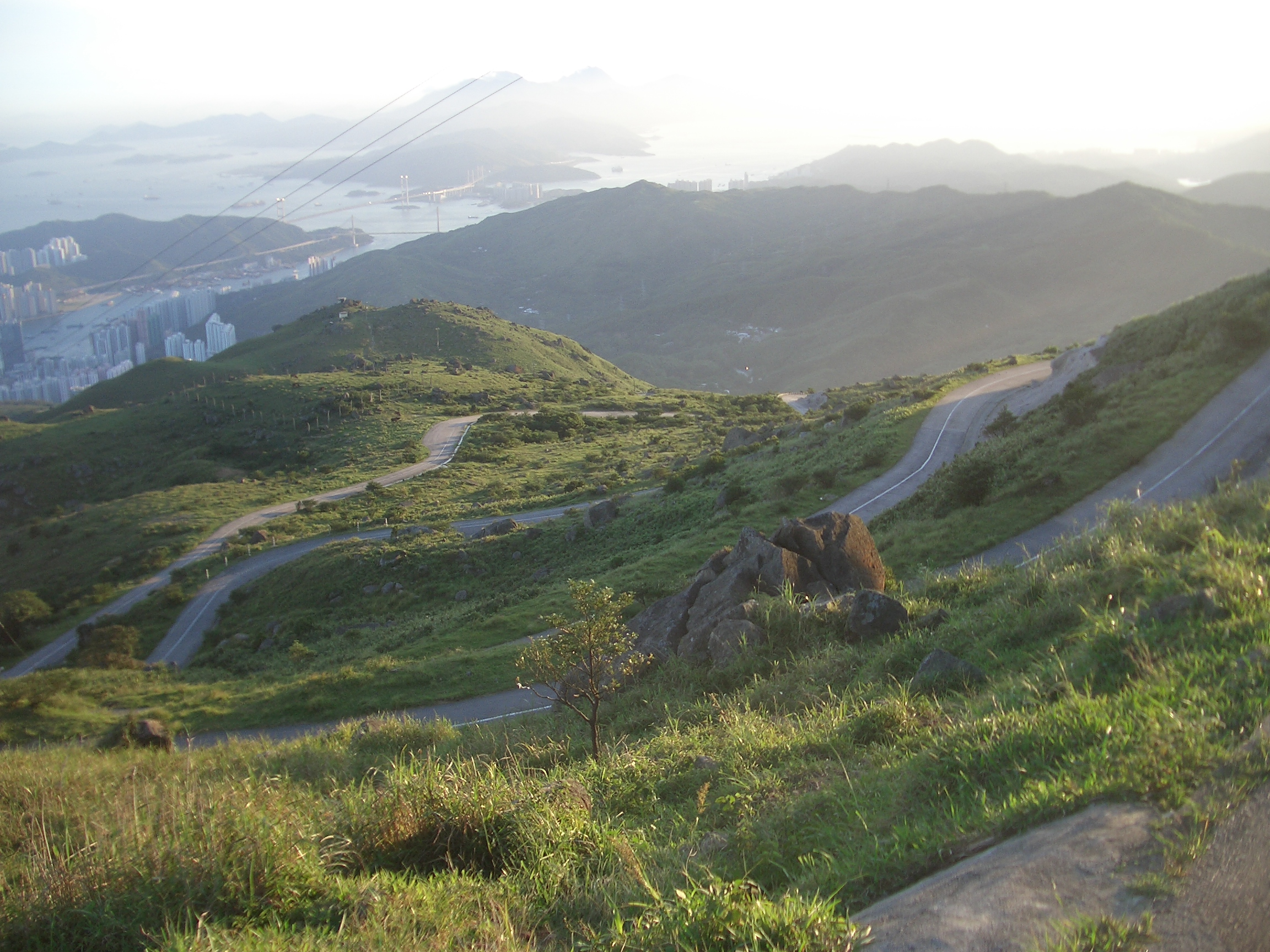
Tai Mo Shan Road

Section 8 starts with a 600-step climb up Sze Fong Shan, the fourth-tallest peak in Hong Kong. The trail flattens out near the summit of Sze Fong Shan — here, the mountain path is littered with boulders, but provides a clear view of Tai Mo Shan ahead. Eventually, the trail opens into the paved Tai Mo Shan Forest Track, winding its way up to the summit of Tai Mo Shan. The highest point on Tai Mo Shan is closed to visitors, as it houses a Hong Kong Observatory weather station and a People's Liberation Army radar station — however, hikers can still enjoy sweeping views over "virtually every part of Hong Kong", including the Tsing Ma Bridge. Tai Mo Shan is the coldest place in Hong Kong, attracting visitors wanting to catch a glimpse of frost during cold spells. Tai Mo Shan also receives more than 30% more rainfall than urban Hong Kong, and acts as the source for both the Lam Tsuen and Shing Mun rivers. The MacLehose Trail follows the winding Tai Mo Shan Road down the opposite side of the mountain. This road segment consists of numerous hairpin bends, which attracts illegal street racing during the night. Until October 2009, the trail ran along the full length of the road to the junction with Route Twisk, but now diverges mid-way onto a dirt path in a bid to segregate vehicular and pedestrian traffic. Section 8 ends on Route Twisk near the Rotary Club and the Tai Mo Shan Country Park Visitor Centre. The Visitor Centre hosts the only kiosk in the area — its proprietor Kong Fo Lin, who had been nominated twice for a lifetime award at the Gone Running Hong Kong Trail Running Awards, acts as "a mother-like figure to the area's many frequent hikers and cyclists". Nearby, toilet facilities, a small campsite, and barbeque areas are available for public use.

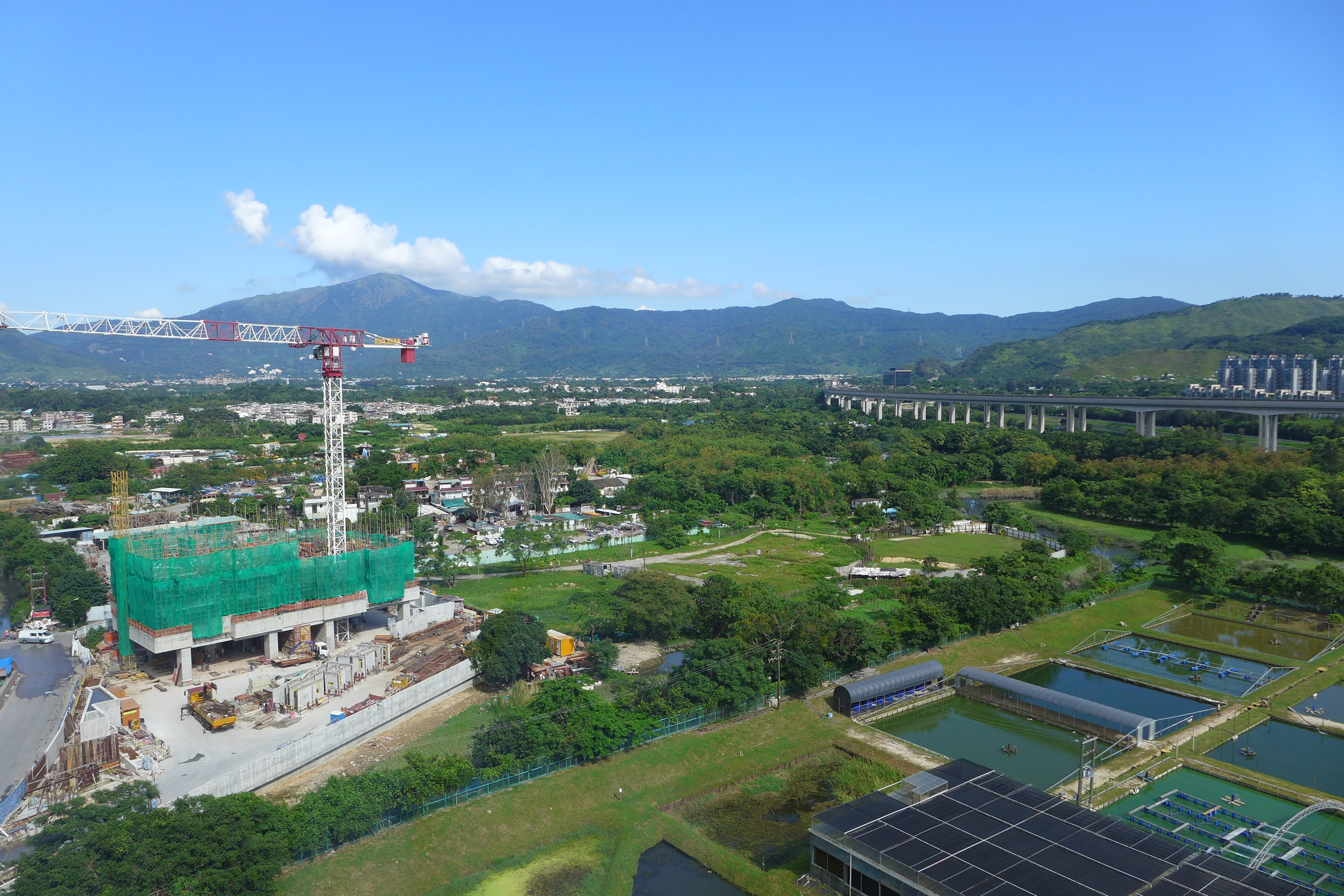
Kam Tin

Section 9 starts on the opposite side of Route Twisk and follows a paved concrete road westwards until it meets Section 10 at Tin Fu Tsai. The trail runs through Tai Lam Country Park, along the mountain ridge separating Tsuen Wan and Yuen Long. Shortly past the starting point is a viewing platform, overlooking Tsuen Wan and Stonecutters Bridge. Further along the trail, the Ho Pui Irrigation Reservoir can be seen towards the north. Situated in a deep valley, Ho Pui Reservoir serves as an important source of water for agriculture in the northwestern New Territories, and was voted one of the top ten attractions of Hong Kong. At the foot of the mountains are the rural communities of Shek Kong, Kam Tin, and Pat Heung, the idyllic scenery of which hikers can enjoy from the MacLehose Trail. Along the trail, flora such as skullcaps, mock strawberries, and Dichrocephala integrifolia can be found. The trail eventually descends from the mountain ridge and meanders through the woodland, before terminating at Tin Fu Tsai, two kilometres away from Tai Lam Chung Reservoir. Tin Fu Tsai Village was founded by the Choi clan 300 years ago, housing several hundred villagers at its peak — it was considered an influential village in the region. Now, few villagers remain, but a medium-sized campsite equipped with barbeque pits and rudimentary toilet facilities is situated nearby.

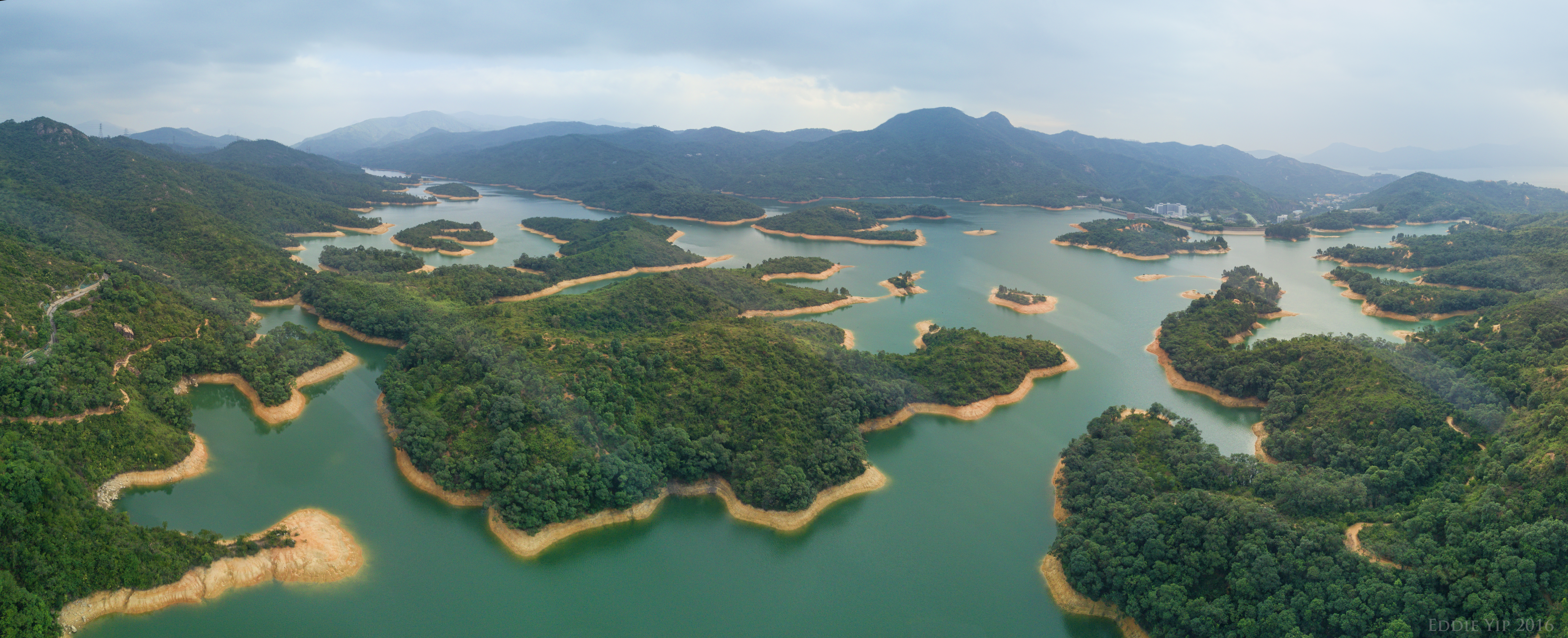
Tai Lam Chung Reservoir

Section 10 is the longest section of the MacLehose Trail. Continuing off Section 9, the trail follows the Tai Lam Forest Track towards Kat Hing Bridge, a historically important bridge connecting Yuen Long and Tsuen Wan before the completion of Castle Peak Road. The MacLehose Trail originally diverged from the concrete road here to follow the northern shore of the Tai Lam Chung Reservoir, but was permanently diverted in October 2009 — the trail now continues along the road, passing through the sweet gum woods of Tai Tong — a seasonally popular destination known for its red autumn leaves. The concrete road eventually gives way to an undulating mountain path, along which a Kwan Tai Temple known for its statue of a red horse is situated. Further along the trail is a crossroads, where a prominent set of stairs leads towards the Reservoir Islands Viewpoint. The viewpoint provides expansive views over the islands of the Tai Lam Chung Reservoir, which gave the reservoir its nickname of "Thousand Island Lake". The main trail then re-joins a concrete road and the old lakeside path near distance post M186. After reaching a car barrier, the trail follows a flat catchwater westwards along the contours of the mountain. This portion stretches for more than six kilometres, with average views over So Kwun Wat and the Gold Coast. Towards the end of the Section, Tuen Mun Town comes into view. The endpoint of the full MacLehose Trail is under a Light Rail overpass near Pui To stop, at the end of a descent from the catchwater — an example of the contrasts between Hong Kong's countryside and urban areas.

== Sporting events ==
=== Trailwalker ===
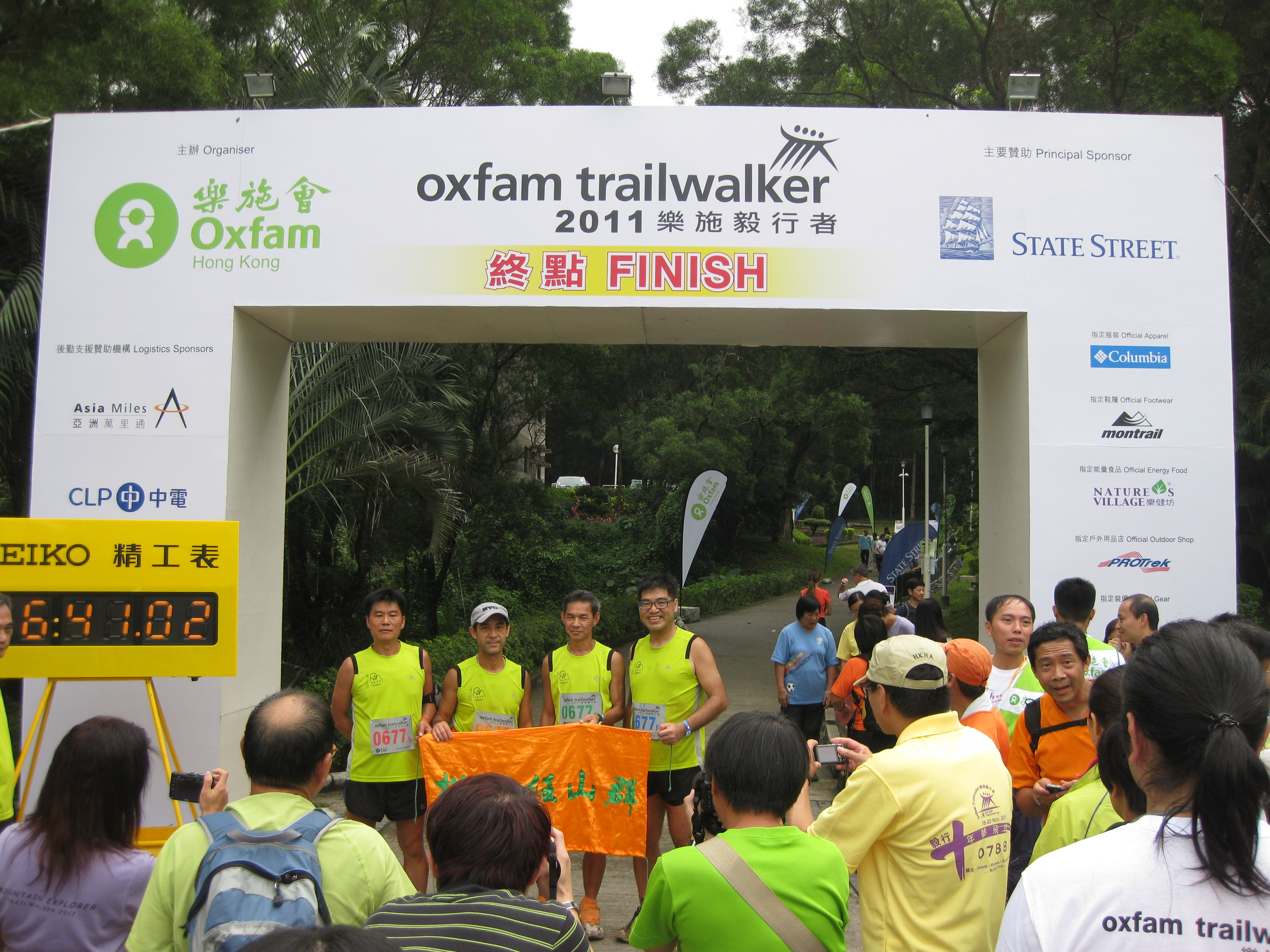
Trailwalker finish line

The Oxfam Trailwalker is a major annual fundraising event held every November that largely follows the MacLehose Trail. The Trailwalker started in 1982 as a military exercise for the Gurkhas, then opened to the public four years later. Participants are required to complete the full 100 kilometres within 48 hours, passing through nine checkpoints along the way. The route as of January 2021 follows the MacLehose Trail from Pak Tam Chung to Tai Mo Shan, then descends to Route Twisk following the old pre-2009 route along Tai Mo Shan Road. The Trailwalker route then rejoins the MacLehose Trail but eventually diverges to follow the northern shore of the Tai Lam Chung Reservoir. At the end of the reservoir, the route takes a sharp turn northwards towards Yuen Long to finally end at the Po Leung Kuk Jockey Club Tai Tong Holiday Camp. As of January 2021, the fastest record for the Trailwalker route is 10 hours and 58 minutes, set in 2013. Since 1986, the event has raised over HK$600m to support poverty alleviation and emergency relief projects across the world.

A sporting event derived from the Trailwalker is the Rebel Walker, which follows the Trailwalker route in reverse. First held in 2018, it aimed to provide a "different hiking experience" on the MacLehose Trail. There is an option to complete a half course, starting in Tsz Wan Shan and ending in Pak Tam Chung.

=== HK100 ===
The Vibram Hong Kong 100 Ultra Trail Race, or HK100 in short, runs from Pak Tam Chung to Tai Mo Shan, following the MacLehose Trail up to Route Twisk for most of its course. The main detour is its deviation from Section 3 of the MacLehose Trail to reach Hoi Ha in the north of the Sai Kung peninsula. The event was first held in 2011 and has since been held annually. HK$862,557 was raised through the 2020 edition of the race, benefitting charities such as the Hong Kong Breast Cancer Foundation and Food Angel.

== See also ==
- List of long-distance footpaths in Hong Kong
