= Long Ke Wan =

Bay in Hong Kong

Coordinates: 22.373370°N 114.376620°E

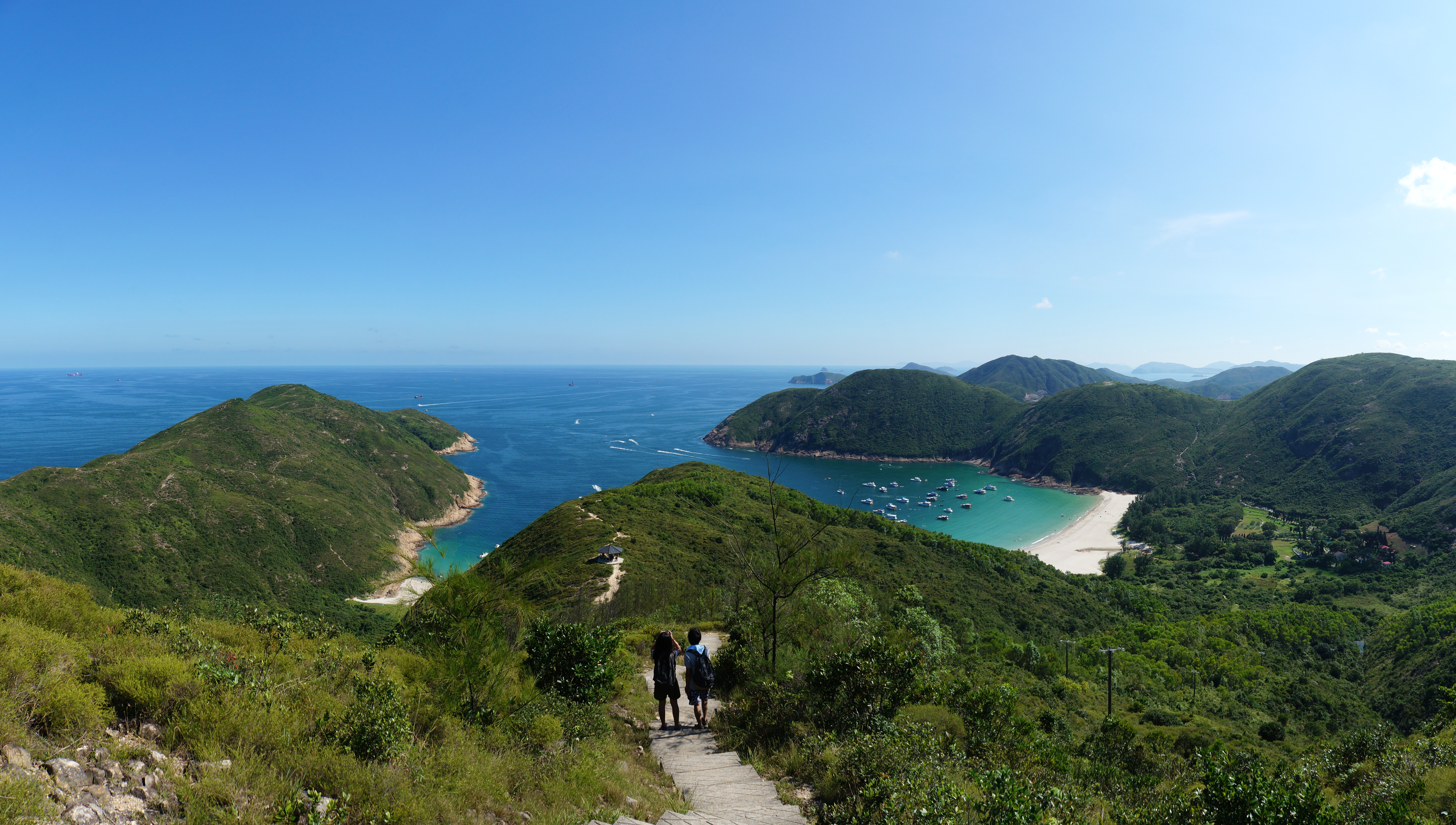
Long Ke Wan and Long Ke Tsai

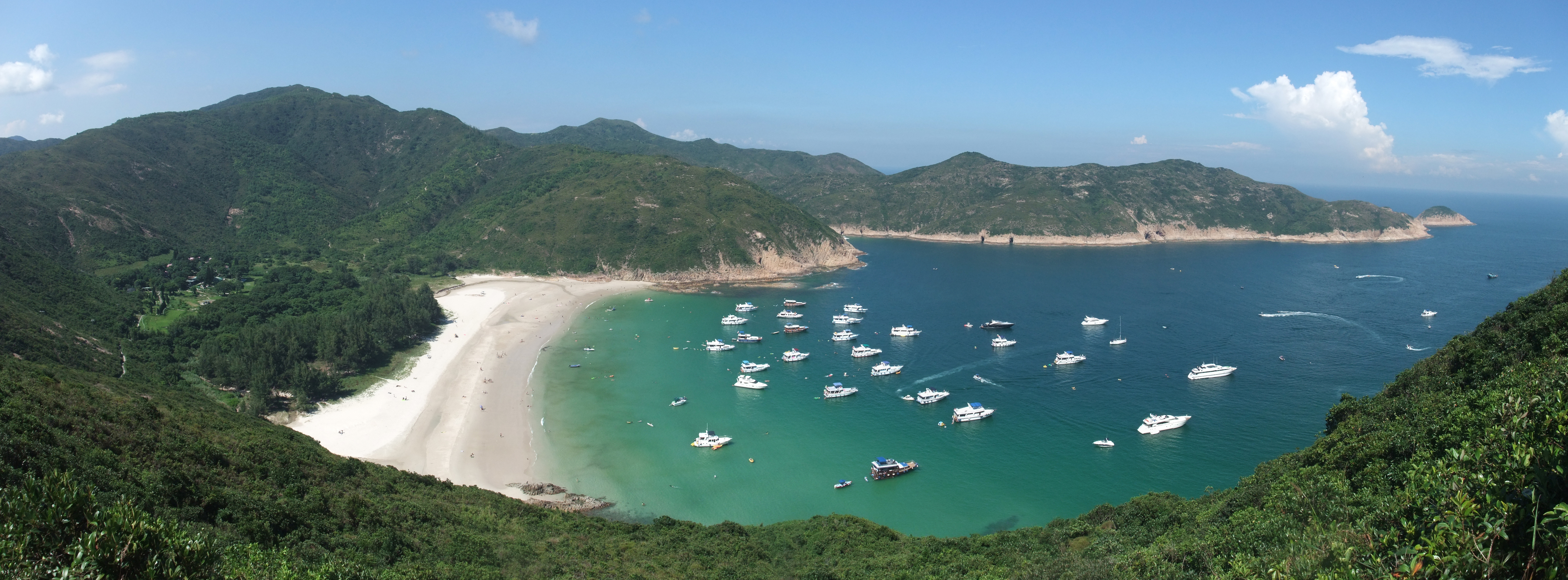
Long Ke Wan

Long Ke Wan (Chinese: 浪茄灣) is a bay in Sai Kung District, Hong Kong.

== Geography ==
Long Ke Wan is located in the southeastern part of Sai Kung Peninsula, north of the East Dam of High Island Reservoir, and within the Sai Kung East Country Park.

== Village ==
Long Ke is a village located on the northwestern shore of the bay. It is a recognized village under the New Territories Small House Policy.

== Features ==
The Nativity of Our Lady Chapel (聖母聖誕小堂), one of the historic churches of Sai Kung Peninsula, is located in Long Ke. It was built in 1918.

== Access ==
Long Ke Wan is located at the end of stage 1 and the start of stage 2 of the MacLehose Trail.

== See also ==
- Beaches of Hong Kong
- List of bays in Hong Kong
