= Tai Lam =

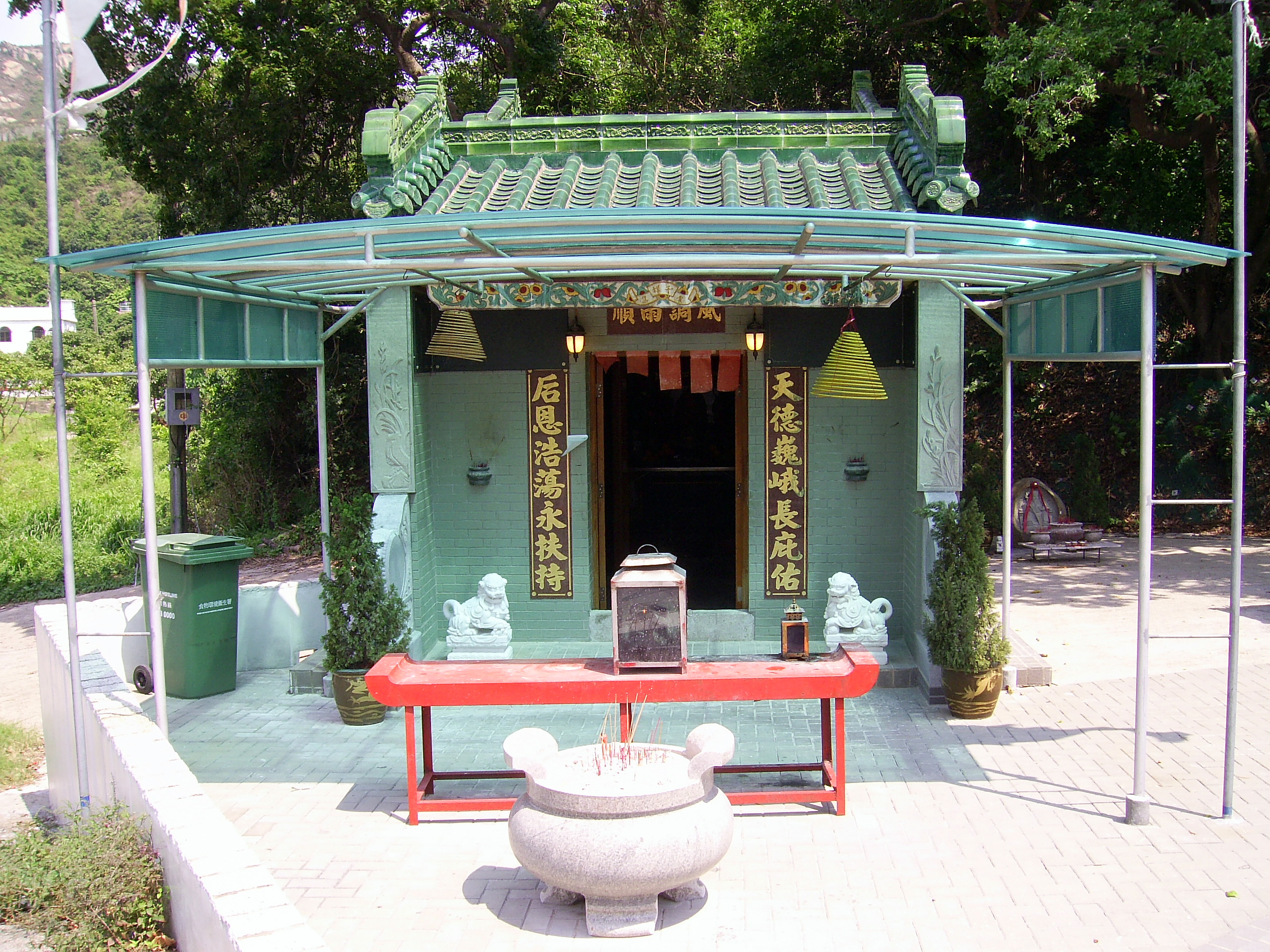
Tin Hau Temple in Tai Lam Kok (大欖角), Tai Lam Chung in 2009.

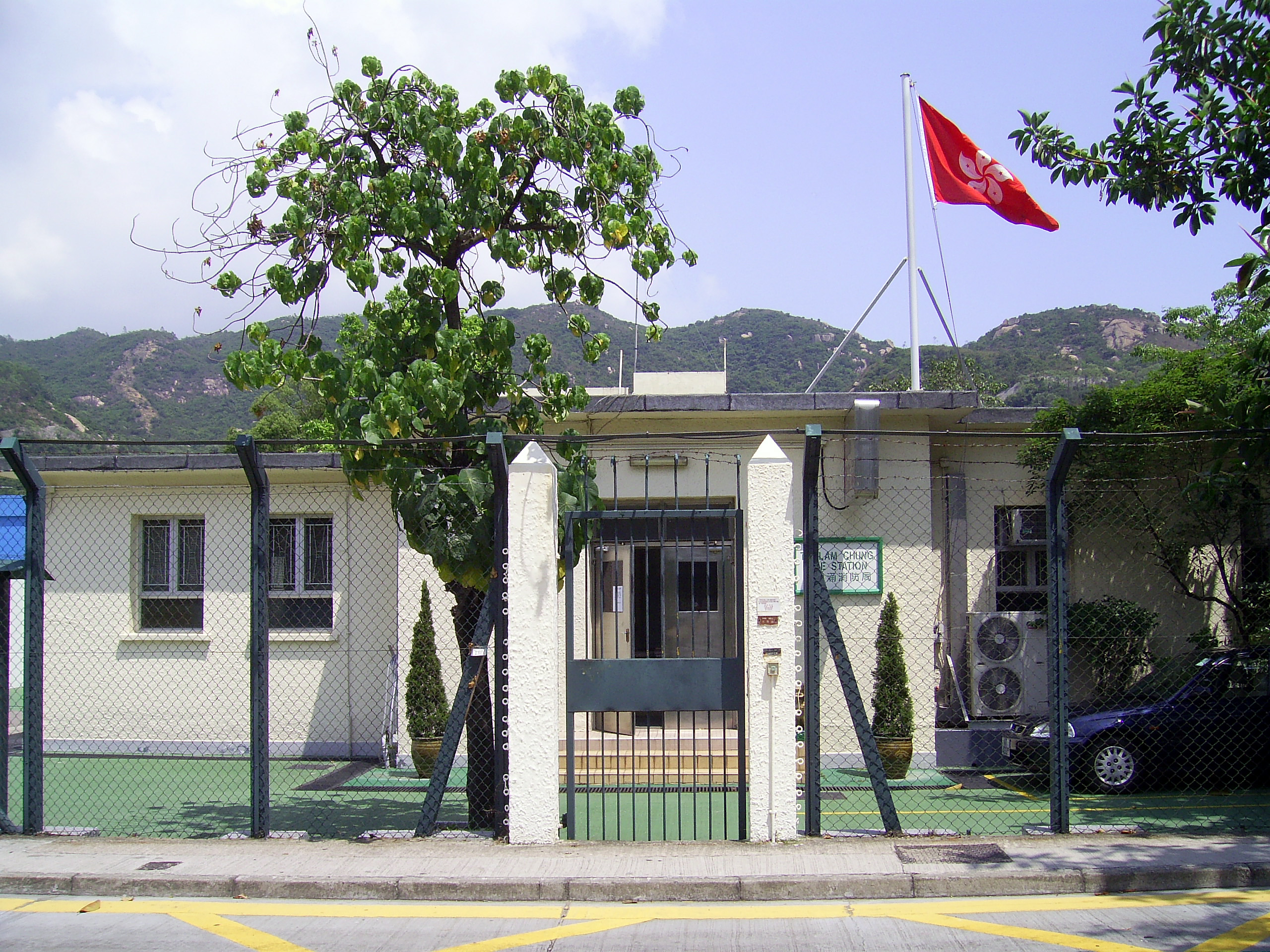
Tai Lam Chung Fire Station.

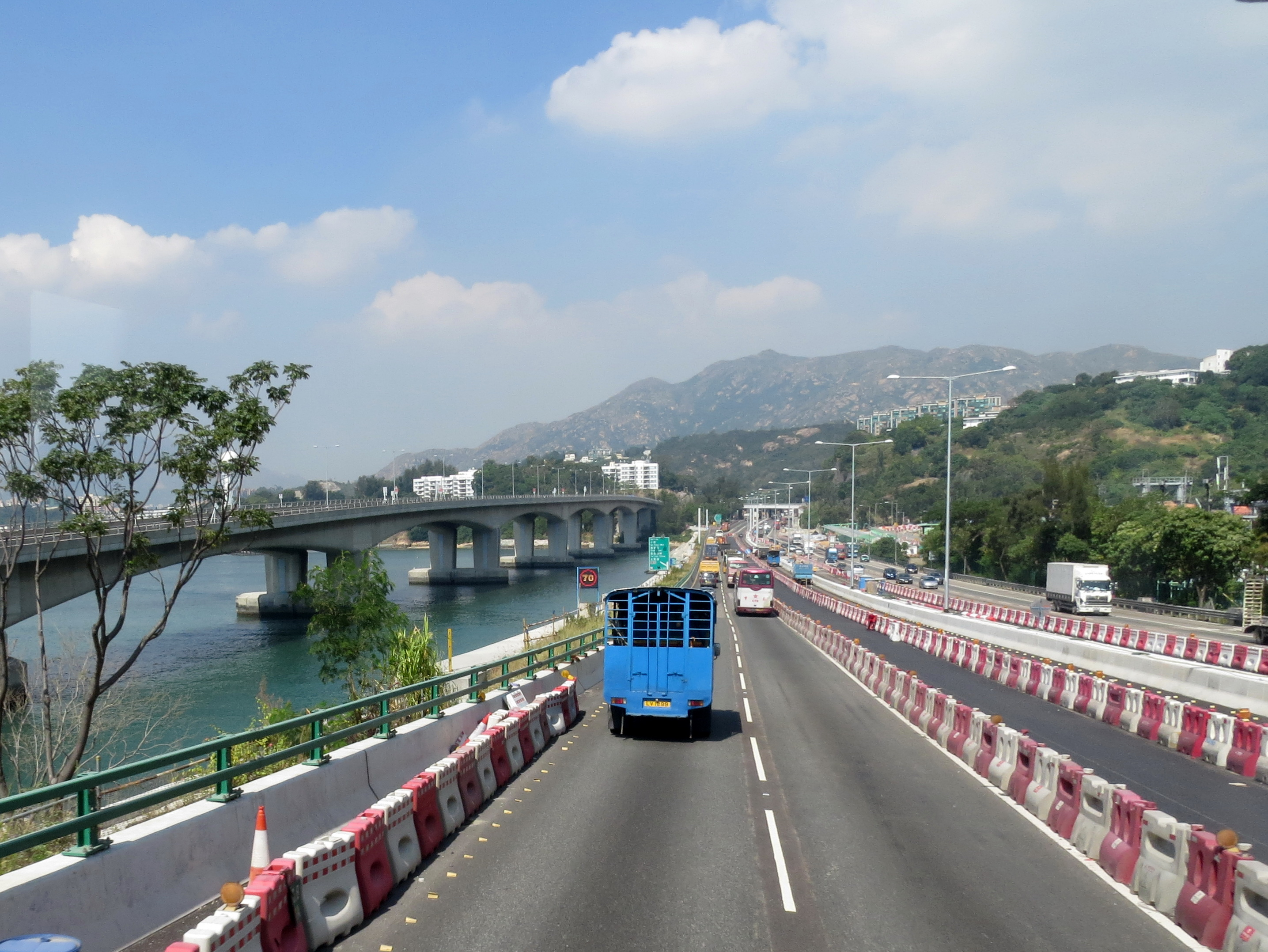
Tuen Mun Road near Tai Lam.

Tai Lam (Chinese: 大欖) or Tai Lam Chung (大欖涌) is an area of Tuen Mun District, in the New Territories of Hong Kong.

== Village ==
Tai Lam Chung Tsuen (大欖涌村) is a recognized village under the New Territories Small House Policy. It is one of the 36 villages represented within the Tuen Mun Rural Committee.

Tai Lam Chung is a multi-clan Hakka area historically inhabited by the Wu in Wu Uk (胡屋), the Wong in Wong Uk (黃屋) and the Lee branching out from Lee Uk Tsuen of So Kwun Wat (掃管笏李屋村). Wu Uk and Wong Uk are both part of Tai Lam Chung Tsuen.

At the time of the 1911 census, the population of Tai Lam was 61. The number of males was 26.

== Features ==
A Tin Hau Temple is located in Tai Lam Kok (大欖角). Built in 1924, it underwent a major renovation in 1955. It was then demolished and reconstructed on the same site in 2006–2007.

== Education ==
Tai Lam Chung is in Primary One Admission (POA) School Net 71. Within the school net are multiple aided schools (operated independently but funded with government money); no government schools are in the school net.

== See also ==
- Maritime Services Training Institute
- Tai Lam Centre for Women
- Tai Lam Chung Reservoir
- Tai Lam Country Park
- Tuen Mun Road
- Yuen Tsuen Ancient Trail
