= Sai Wan Shan (Sai Kung) =

Mountain of Hong Kong

- 西灣山
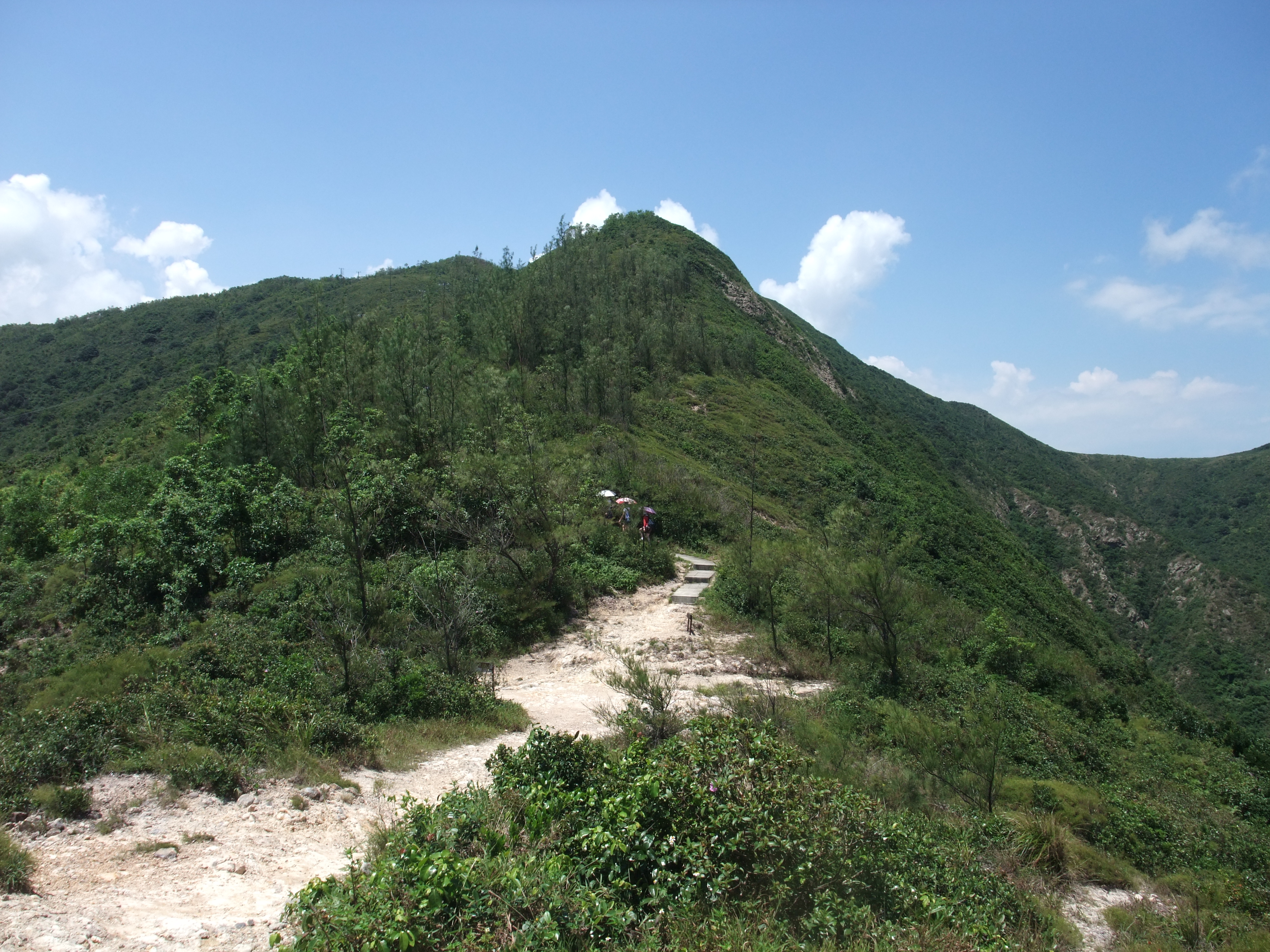
- Sai Wan Shan Summit

Highest point
- Elevation: 314 m (1,030 ft)
- Coordinates: 22°23′14″N 114°22′40″E

Geography
- Location within Hong Kong
- Location: Eastern New Territories, Hong Kong

Sai Wan Shan (Chinese: 西灣山) is a hill that lies within Sai Kung East Country Park, south of Tai Long Wan, on the Sai Kung Peninsula in Hong Kong. It has a height of 314 metres (1,030 ft) above sea level. The hill is reasonably easy for hikers and is a popular site for hiking in Hong Kong. A portion of MacLehose Trail Stage 2 is built along the ridge of this hill.

== See also ==
- List of mountains, peaks and hills in Hong Kong
- Sai Kung Country Park
- Sharp Peak
