= Wa Mei Shan =

Mountain in Lam Tsuen Country Park, Hong Kong

- 畫眉山
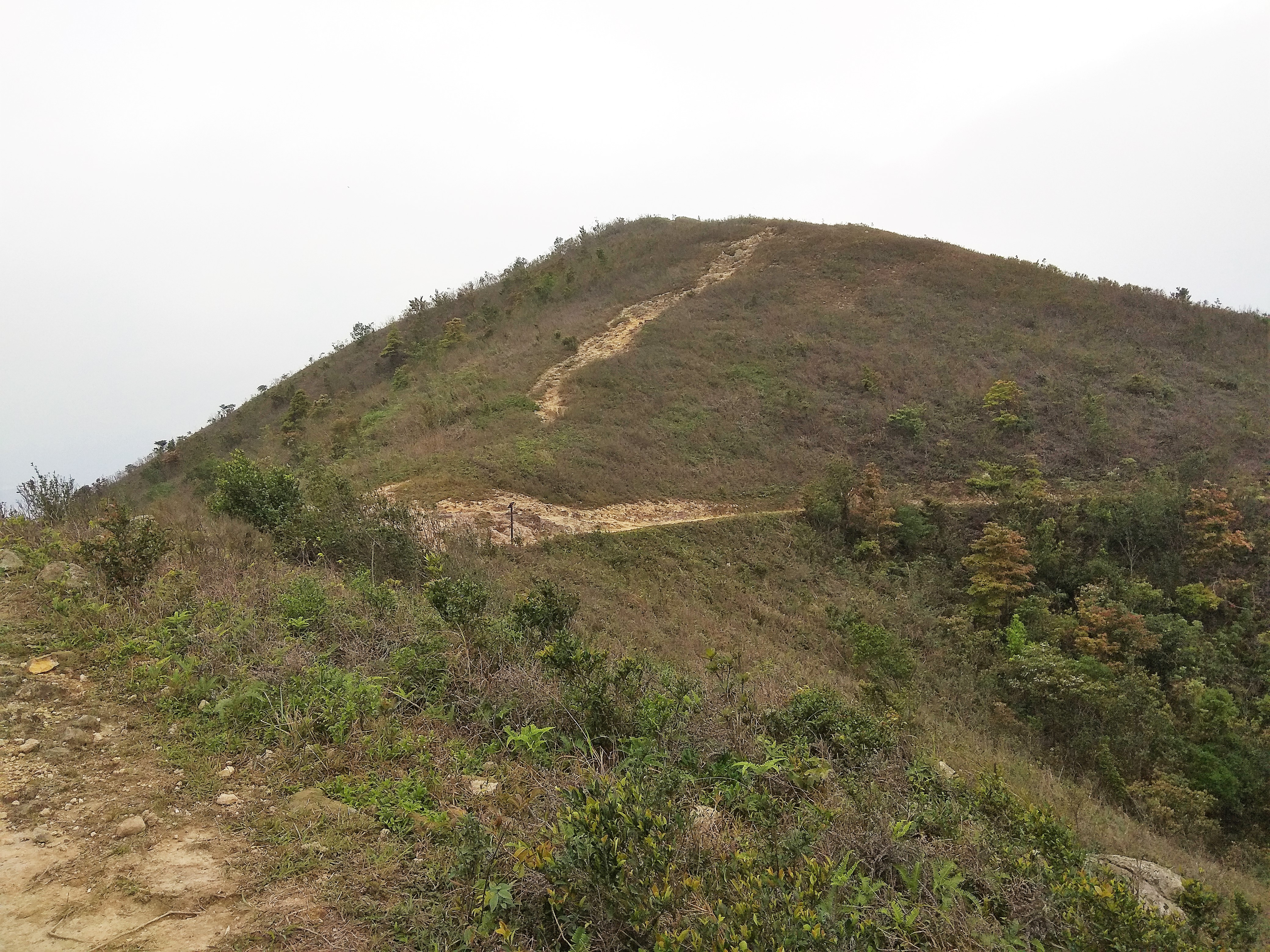

Highest point
- Elevation: 391 m (1,283 ft)
- Coordinates: 22°25′28″N 114°18′22″E

Geography
- Location within Hong Kong
- Location: Hong Kong

Wa Mei Shan (Chinese: 畫眉山) is a mountain in northeastern Hong Kong on Sai Kung Peninsula. It is located within Tai Po District.

== Geography ==
Wa Mei Shan is 391 metres tall and is one of the taller mountains on Sai Kung Peninsula.

== Access ==
MacLehose Trail Stage 3 passes through the southeastern foot of this hill. There are no roads leading into this area.

== See also ==
- List of mountains, peaks and hills in Hong Kong
