= Sze Fong Shan =

- 四方山
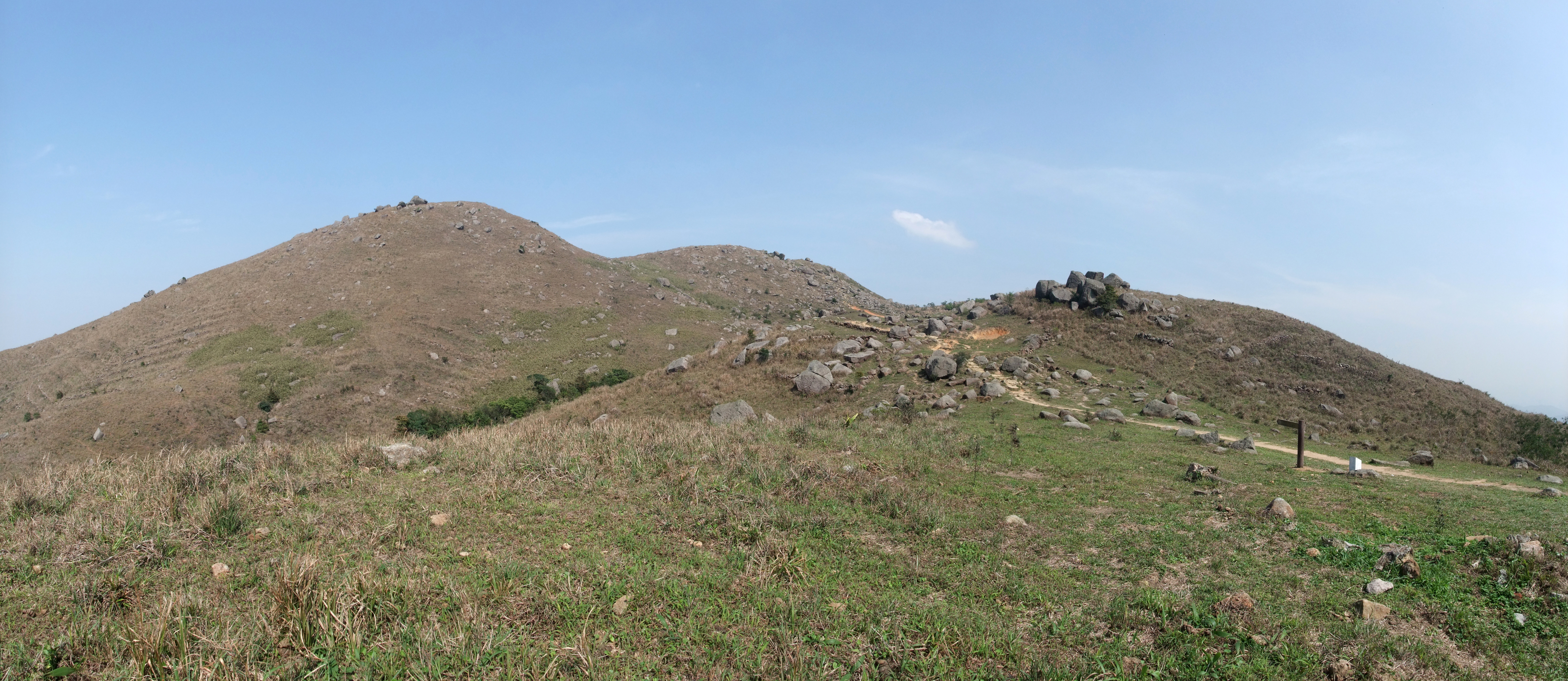
- Sze Fong Shan

Highest point
- Elevation: 784 m (2,572 ft)
- Coordinates: 22°25′03″N 114°08′09″E

Geography
- Location within Hong Kong
- Location: Centre of New Territories, Hong Kong

Sze Fong Shan (Chinese: 四方山), located in Tai Po District of the New Territories, is the fourth highest peak in Hong Kong. With a height of 784 m (2,572 ft), it is northeast of Tai Mo Shan. The Eighth Stage of the MacLehose Trail passes near it.

== Name ==
The Cantonese name Sze Fong Shan (Chinese: 四方山; Cantonese Yale: sei fōng shāan, Jyutping: Sei^{3} Fong^{1} Saan^{1}) literally means "Square Mountain".

== Subpeak ==
Chau Ma Kong (588 metres (1,929 ft)) is a subpeak north-northeast of Sze Fong Shan and east of Ng Tung Chai waterfalls.

== See also ==
- List of mountains, peaks and hills in Hong Kong
