= Tai Lam Country Park =

Country park in the New Territories, Hong Kong

Coordinates: 22°23′38″N 114°00′24″E

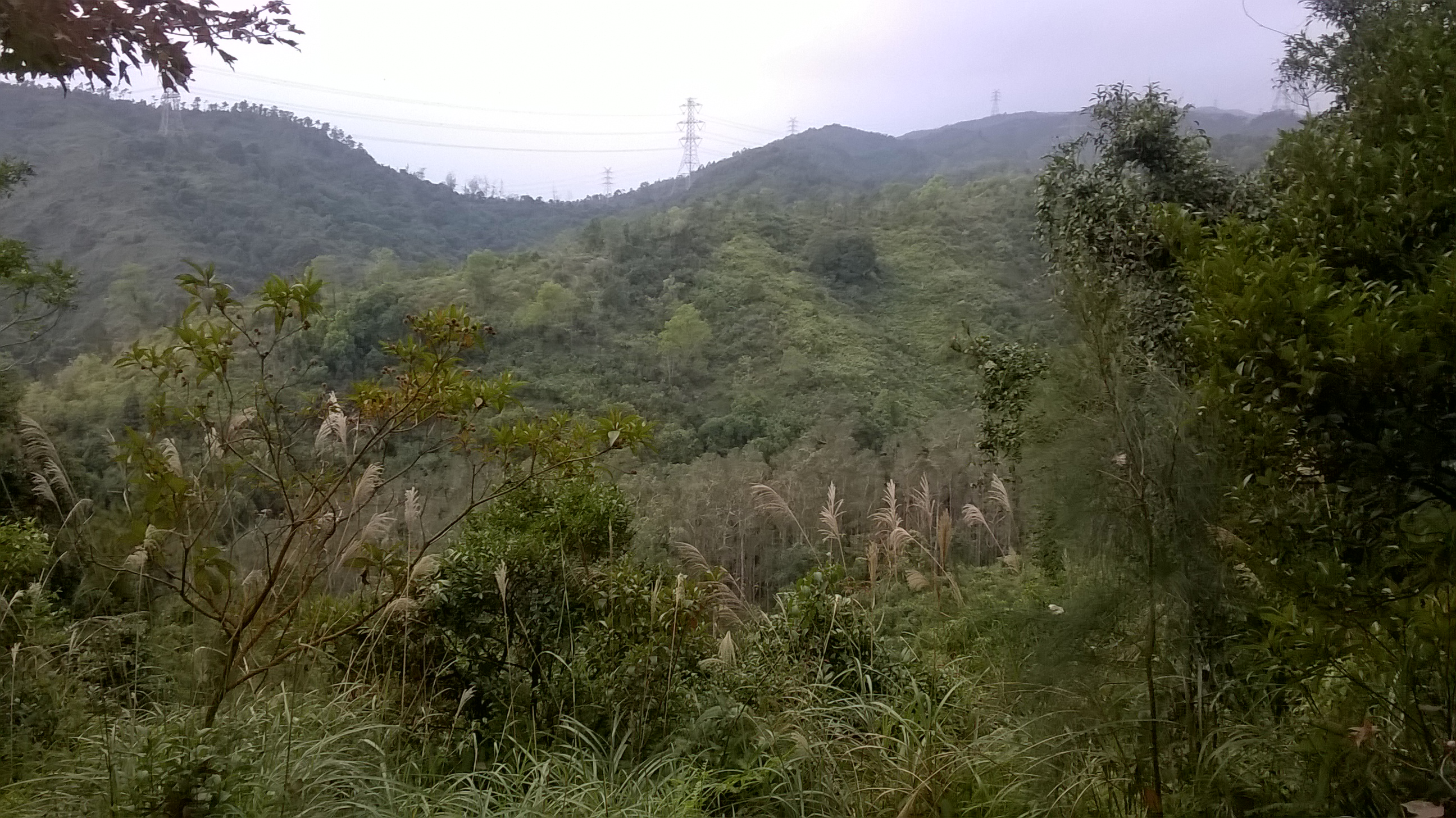
- Type: Country park
- Location: New Territories, Hong Kong
- Area: 5,412 hectares (13,370 acres)
- Designated: 23 February 1979; 47 years ago
- Manager: Agriculture, Fisheries and Conservation Department

Tai Lam Country Park
- Traditional Chinese: 大欖郊野公園
- Simplified Chinese: 大榄郊野公园
Transcriptions
Standard Mandarin
- Hanyu Pinyin: Dàlǎn Jiāoyě Gōngyuán
Yue: Cantonese
- Jyutping: daai6 laam5 gaau1 je5 gung1 jyun4

Tai Lam Country Park, established on 23 February 1979, is a country park located in Tai Lam, at the south of Yuen Long Town, Kam Tin and Shek Kong and east of Tuen Mun Town, in the western New Territories of Hong Kong. This country park has an area of 54 km^{2}.

== Etymology ==
The country park is named after Tai Lam where the park is located nearby. A river stream also named after the area as Tai Lam Chung (大欖涌). Due to the construction of a dam, the water flows into the Tai Lam Chung Reservoir. The reservoir is entirely surrounded by the country park. The reservoir is managed by the Water Supplies Department. Tai Lam Tunnel and Tai Lam railway tunnel pass through the country park underground. A village, as well as two prisons: Tai Lam Centre for Women and Tai Lam Correctional Institution, all outside the boundary of the country park, are named after Tai Lam.

The tai (Chinese: 大) in Tai Lam means large. There is another area known as Siu Lam, which siu (Chinese: 小) means small in Chinese.

== Highlights ==
A series of barbecue and picnic sites are provided along Route Twisk, the Shek Kong, Pat Heung catchwater and the Tuen Mun catchwater. In addition, there are a lot of trails. For example, the MacLehose Trail and the Kap Lung Forest Trail start from the top of Route Twisk near the Country Park Management Centre. The Twisk Nature Trail near the Country Park Management Centre introduces the natural environment and human impacts in the area.

The fitness trail at So Kwun Wat catchwater provides 14 sets of fitness equipment for visitors and morning walkers.

== See also ==
- Conservation in Hong Kong
- Tin Fu Tsai
