= Cheung Sheung =

Village in Hong Kong

Coordinates: 22.428947°N 114.309642°E

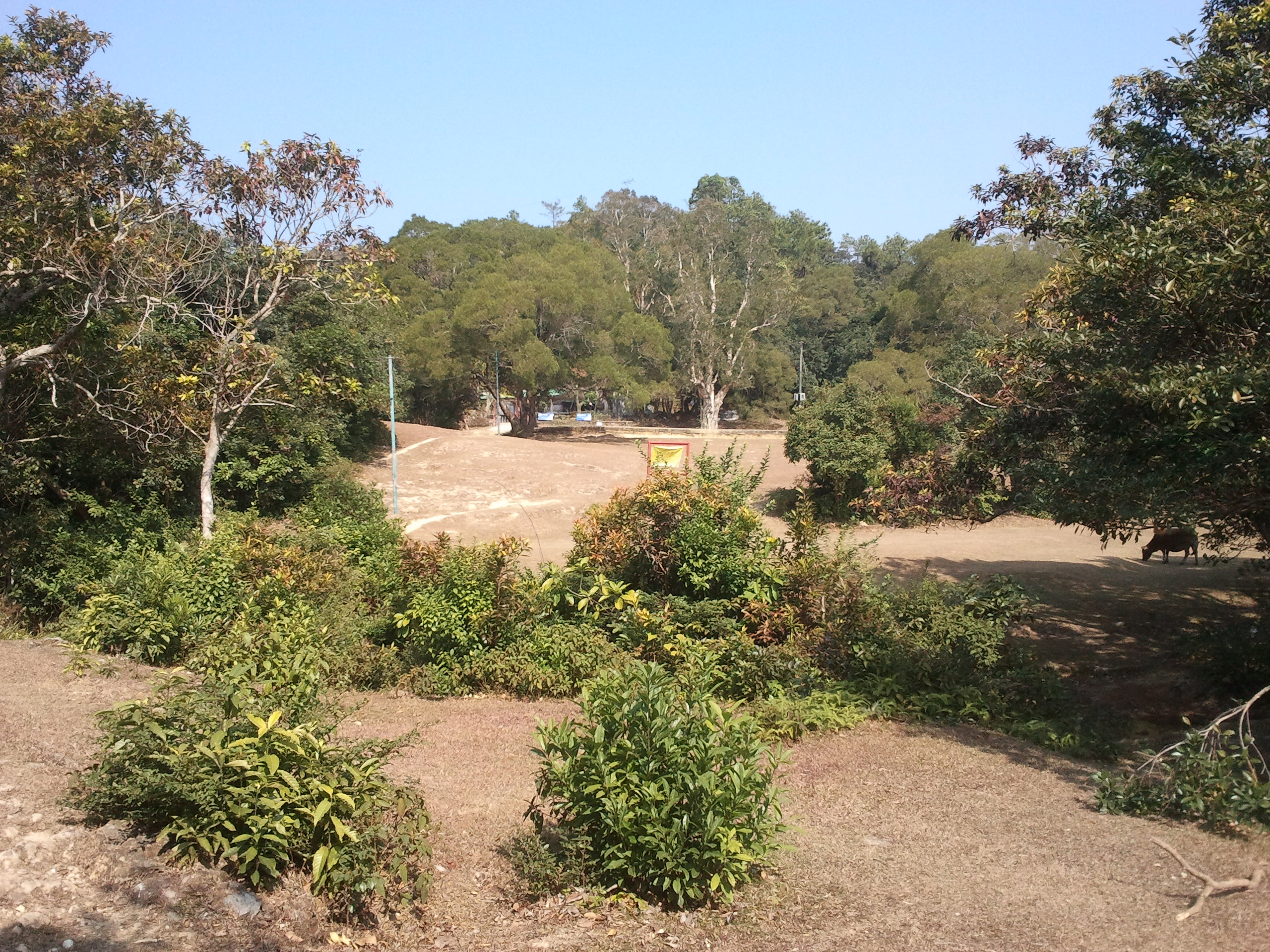
Cheung Sheung

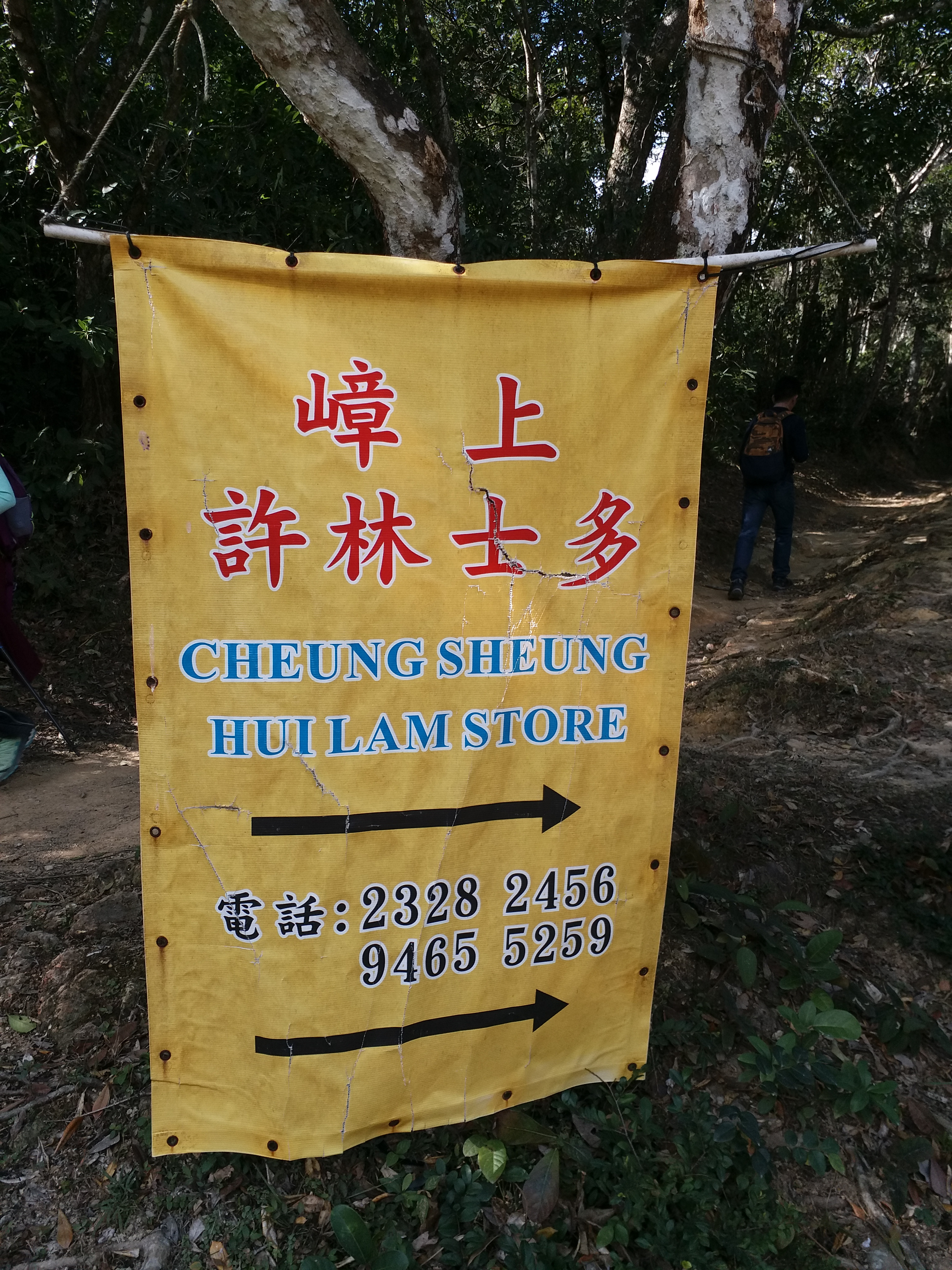
Store sign in Cheung Sheung.

Cheung Sheung (Chinese: 嶂上) is a village of in the Sai Kung North area of Tai Po District, Hong Kong.

== Administration ==
Cheung Sheung is a recognized village under the New Territories Small House Policy.

== History ==
Cheung Sheung Plateau was the site of several villages with schools during the peak era of the area, in the 1950s-1960s. Villagers moved to urban areas in the 1970s.

== Features ==
Cheung Sheung is the site of the former Pok Oi Public School (博愛公立學校).

The Cheung Sheung Campsite is managed by the Agriculture, Fisheries and Conservation Department.

A store is open in the area during holidays.

== Access ==
Cheung Sheung is located along Section 3 of the MacLehose Trail and the Cheung Sheung Country Trail (嶂上郊遊徑).
