= Trailwalker =

World fundraising event

Oxfam Trailwalker (Hong Kong) logo.

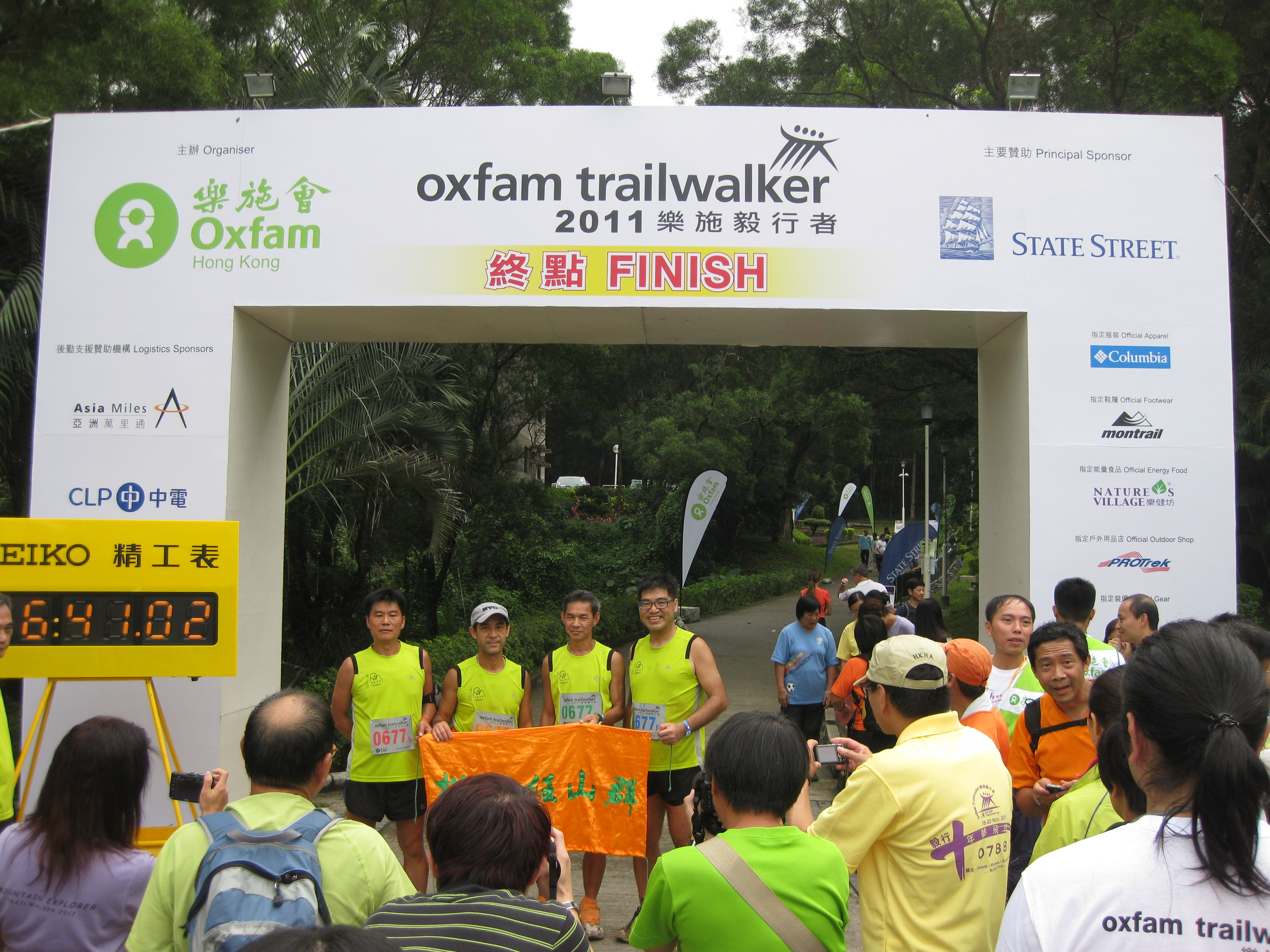
End point of 2011 HK Trailwalker 2011

Trailwalker and the related Trailtrekker are fundraising endurance events conducted across the world by Oxfam and The Gurkha Welfare Trust (Trailwalker UK). Teams of four competitors must complete a course of 100 kilometres (62 mi) in a set time limit - typically between 24 and 48 hours. The routes may be point-to-point or follow a circular route returning to the start.

== History ==
The event was established in 1981 by Brigadier Mervyn Lee in Hong Kong as a training exercise by the Queen's Gurkha Signals, part of the Brigade of Gurkhas of the British Army, which was at the time based in the British colony. In 1986, teams of civilians were allowed to take part and Oxfam Hong Kong was invited to co-organise the event.

In 1997, with the handover of Hong Kong to China, the Gurkha regiments were relocated to the United Kingdom. The Trailwalker event followed the Gurkhas' relocation and was organised over the South Downs in Sussex, with Oxfam in the UK acting as partner since 2002, alongside the Gurkha Welfare Trust. Oxfam Hong Kong continued to organise the original event without the Gurkhas and the event has grown with 17 events now taking place across 10 countries worldwide.

In 2017, Ian Crawford of Petersfield, Hampshire, continuing his support of the Gurkha Welfare Trust and aged 74 years old, completed a record 19th UK Trailwalker in a time of 29hrs 34mins.

In late 2022, Oxfam withdrew from organising Trailwalker UK. It is now solely organised by The Gurkha Welfare Trust in partnership with The Queen's Gurkha Signals.

The Trailwalker UK course record was set in 2024 when team Gurkha ARRC finished in an incredible 9 hours 23 minutes, smashing the previous record set in 2004 by the Queen's Own Gurkha Logistic Regiment.

== Events ==
Country	Location	Start	Finish	Time Limit	Year
Hong Kong	Maclehose Trail	Pak Tam Chung, Sai Kung	Tai Tong, Yuen Long	48 hours	1981
United Kingdom Trailwalker	South Downs	Petersfield	Brighton Racecourse	30 hours	1997
United Kingdom Trailtrekker	Yorkshire Dales	Skipton	Skipton	30 hours	2009
Ireland Trailtrekker	Newcastle, County Down	Donark Park	Carlingford	30 hours	2009
Australia	Sydney	Hawkesbury River	Seaforth	48 hours	1999
Australia	Melbourne	Jells Park, Wheelers Hill	Wesburn Park, Yarra Valley	48 hours	2003
Australia	Brisbane	Mt Glorious	Mt Coot-tha	48 hours	2011
Australia	Perth	Darlington	Lesmurdie	48 hours	2013
New Zealand	Whakatāne	Edgecumbe	Whakatāne	48 hours	2019
Japan		Odawara City	Lake Yamanaka	48 hours	2007
Belgium	High Fens	Bütgenbach	Eupen	30 hours	2008
France	Parc du Morvan, Bourgogne			30 hours	2010
France	Vallee d'Abondance in the Haut-Savoie, []			30 hours	2014
Germany	Spessart	Bad Orb	Bad Orb	30 hours	2010
Spain	Girona	Olot	Sant Feliu de Guíxols (Costa Brava)	32 hours	2011
Spain	Madrid	Valle de Lozoya		32 hours	
India	Bengaluru	Anekal or Mekedaatu	Eagelton-Bidadi	48 hours	2012
India	Mumbai	Mulshi Lake	Lonavala	48 hours	2012
Spain	Euskadi	Vitoria Mountains	Vitoria Mountains	32 hours	2017
Korea	Gurye and Jiri MT. in Jeollanam	Guyre Natural Dream Park	Guyre Natural Dream Park	38 hours	2017

== Common rules ==
There are some common rules across all the Trailwalker and Trailtrekker events.

- Each team must have four members, who are required to cross all checkpoints and finish line together, although teams may continue with only three members if one has to retire.
- The Trailwalker event course, referred to as 'the trail,' is 100 kilometres long.
- Participants should also organise a support team, plan and start their training schedule at least three months before the event.
- All teams must raise a minimum sponsorship amount. Failure to raise the stated amount could mean teams do not take part in the scheduled event. Teams failing to meet the required amount approx $1600 are given an opportunity in the next years event with no refunds on entry fees and fund already raised. Teams raising over the threshold will take priority in registering for Oxfam Trailwalker next year.

== Macau TrailWalker ==
In mid-2010, Upward Bound Unlimited (UBU), a Macau-based company which organizes sports tourism events in the Pearl River Delta region, and Macau's main English-language daily newspaper, the Macau Daily Times, announced that a cross-country hiking event called "Macau TrailWalker" would be held later in the year with the support of the local Macau authorities. The event was held on 9 October 2010 on the outer island of Coloane and consisted of a 30 km category and a 12 km category.

Prior to the event, Oxfam Hong Kong issued a press release stating among other things that it was not associated with the event or any of its organizers (nor had it been contacted by them), that it did not approve nor endorse the event, that no sponsorship money from the event would be used in any Oxfam aid work, and that it "reserved the right to take appropriate legal action to protect the Trailwalker name".
