= West Buffalo Hill =

Mountain in Hong Kong

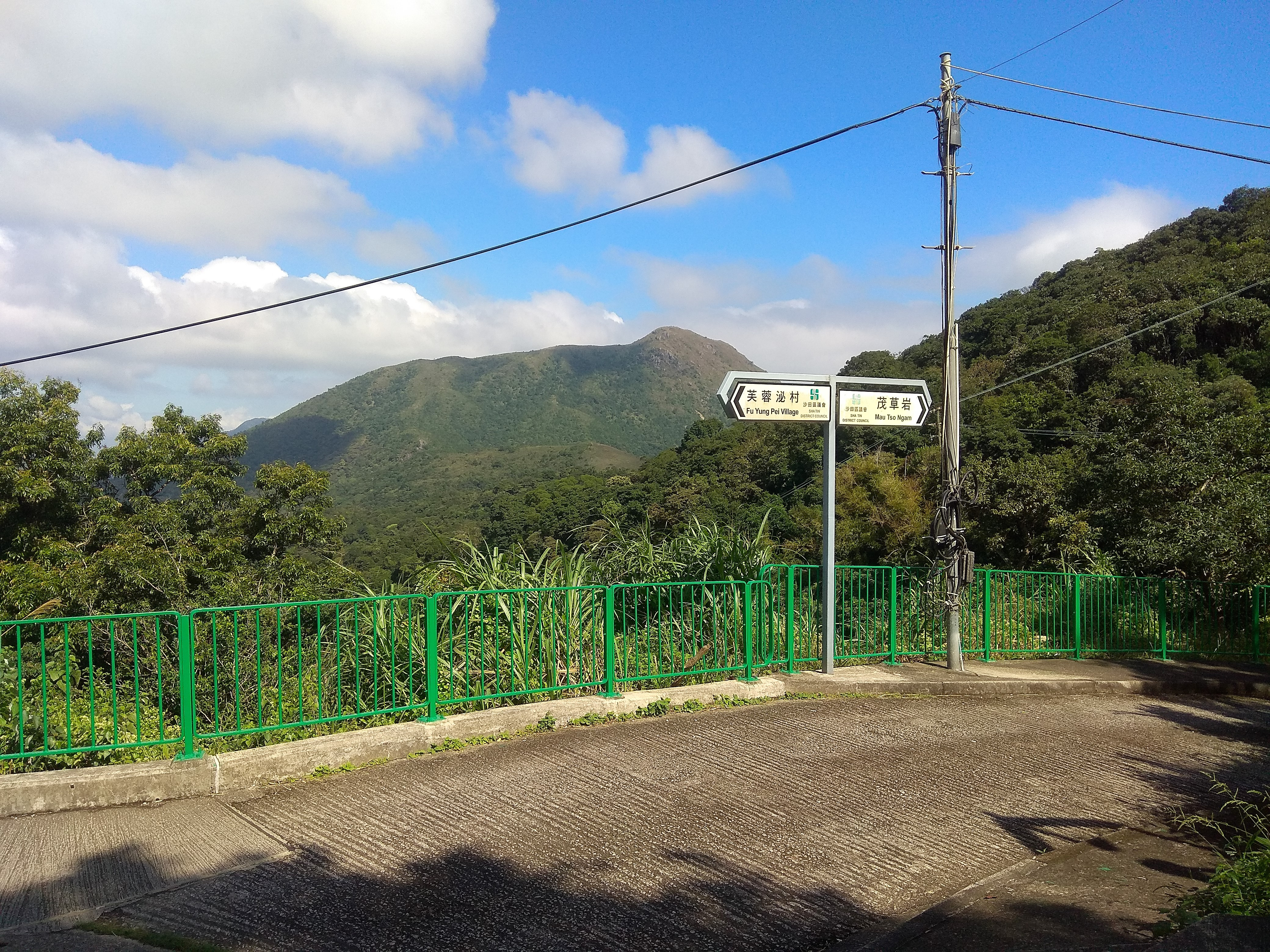

Highest point
- Elevation: 604 m (1,982 ft)
- Coordinates: 22°22′22″N 114°13′55″E

Geography
- Location within Hong Kong
- Location: Between Sha Tin and Sai Kung Districts, east of Siu Lek Yuen, Hong Kong

West Buffalo Hill (Chinese: 西水牛山) or Wong Ngau Shan (黃牛山) is a 604-metre-high (1,982-foot) hill within Ma On Shan Country Park, New Territories, Hong Kong. It lies directly west of Buffalo Hill, thus receiving its name. Stage 4 of the MacLehose Trail passes through the hill.

== See also ==
- List of mountains, peaks and hills in Hong Kong
- Buffalo Hill
