= Buffalo Hill (Hong Kong) =

Hill in Hong Kong

- 水牛山
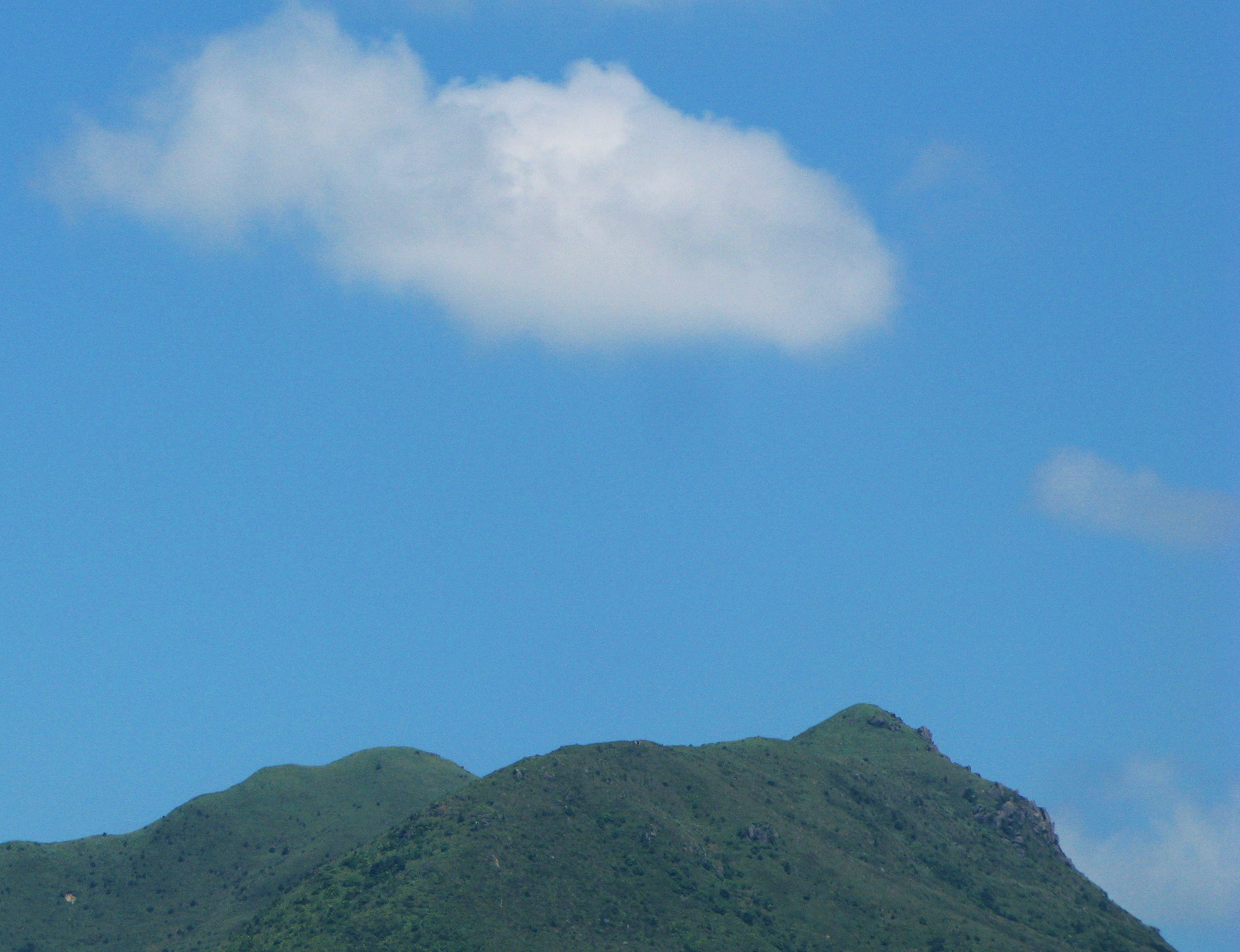
- Buffalo Hill viewed from Sha Tin

Highest point
- Elevation: 606 m (1,988 ft)
- Coordinates: 22°22′22.00″N 114°14′00″E

Geography
- Location within Hong Kong
- Location: Eastern New Territories, Hong Kong

Buffalo Hill (Chinese: 水牛山) is a hill located in Ma On Shan Country Park west of Sai Kung, in the eastern half of Hong Kong. It is particularly well known for its peak resembling the head of a Buffalo when viewed from Sha Tin. MacLehose Trail passes within 225 metres from the peak of the hill, while smaller trails cut off the main MacLehose trail up to the peak of Buffalo Hill. It is the sixteenth tallest peak in Hong Kong, with an altitude of 606 metres (1,988 ft), bordering Sha Tin and Sai Kung.

== Geography ==
Buffalo Hill can be identified by its uniquely shaped Buffalo's head peak. Eight valleys associated with six streams lie around the slope of the hill. The biggest stream and valley flows along the north-eastern slope of Buffalo Hill and into the Shing Mun River. The entire hill is composed of exposed basalt rock, with some smaller granite deposits also present.

== Vegetation ==
The peak of Buffalo Hill is covered by grass and small shrubs, while the valleys are lush with forests. Different types of grass, including Couch grass, Bermuda Grass, Manila Grass and annual bluegrass, grow on the slopes of the hill, while the tree line ends approximately 350 metres above sea level on the slopes of the hill.

== See also ==
- List of mountains, peaks and hills in Hong Kong
- West Buffalo Hill
