= Tai Lam Chung Reservoir =

Reservoir in New Territories, Hong Kong

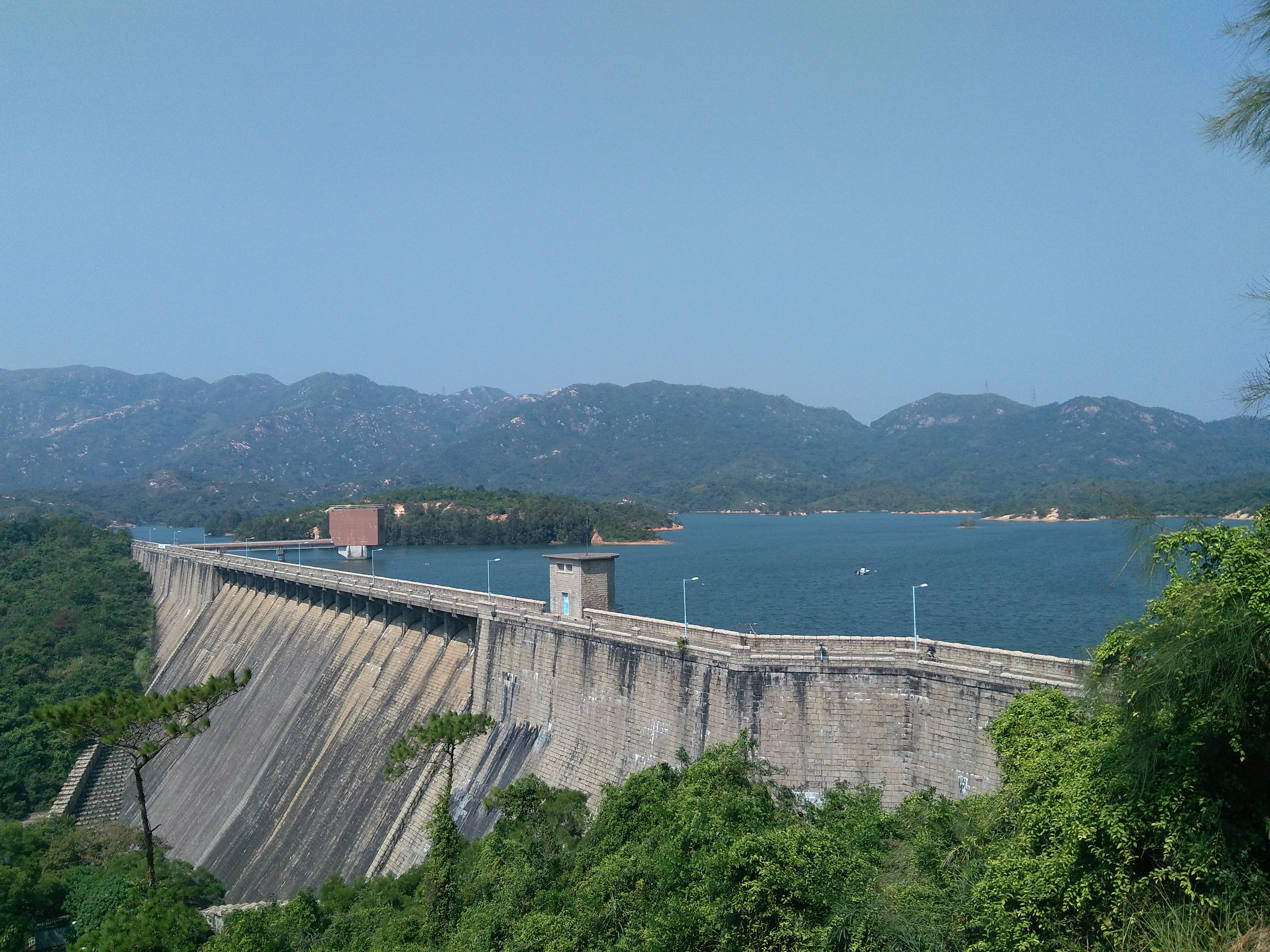
- Image of Tai Lam Chung Reservoir (taken in November 2017
- Interactive map of Tai Lam Chung Reservoir
- Location: Tuen Mun District, Hong Kong
- Coordinates: 22°23′06″N 114°01′55″E
- Type: Reservoir

Tai Lam Chung Reservoir
- Traditional Chinese: 大欖涌水塘
Transcriptions
Standard Mandarin
- Hanyu Pinyin: Da4 lan3 chong1 shui3 tang2
Yue: Cantonese
- Yale Romanization: Daaih láahm chūng séui tòhng
- Jyutping: Daai6 laam5 cung1 seoi2 tong4

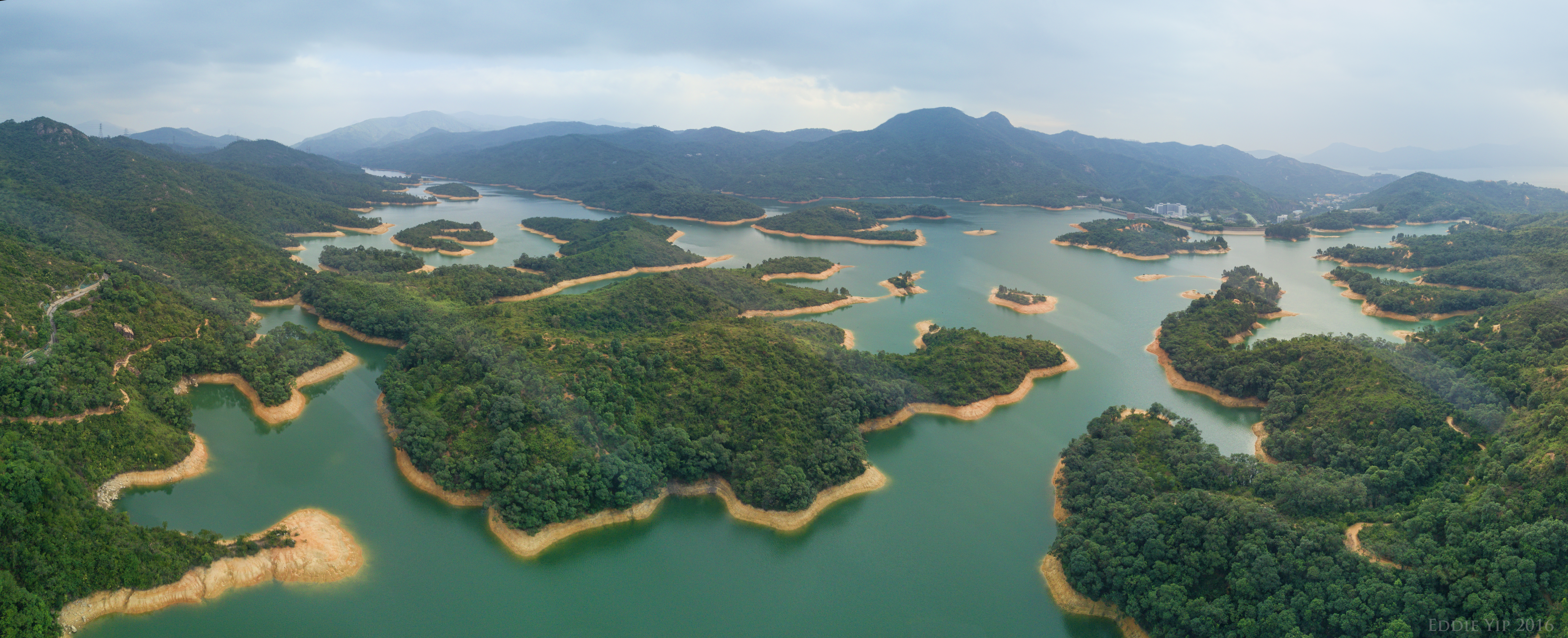
Panoramic view of Tai Lam Chung Reservoir

Tai Lam Chung Reservoir is a reservoir in Tai Lam Country Park, Tuen Mun District, New Territories, Hong Kong.

== History ==
=== Construction ===
Tai Lam Chung Reservoir is the first reservoir built in Hong Kong after the Second World War. As the demand for clean water supplies in Hong Kong grew greater, the construction work of the reservoir commenced in 1952 and was completed in 1957. Formed by a main dam across the Tai Lam Chung Valley, there are three supplemental dams that cross the nearby valley. Its water storage capacity is about 21 million cubic metres.

=== Effects on locals ===
In order to plan for the construction of the reservoir, the government had to relocate villages of the Tai Lam Villages and Kan Uk Tei Villages to the Tai Uk Wai Villages for re-settlement.

Several villages were flooded by the reservoir, including Tai Lam Village (大欖村), Tai Wai Village, Kan Uk Tei Village (關屋地村) and Wu Uk Village.

=== Water shortage in 1960s ===
In the late 1960s, the government of Hong Kong started to import water from Dongjiang in China to improve the situation of water shortages at the time. The water was transferred to Tai Lam Chung Reservoir, which made it important in Hong Kong's water supply system.

=== Today ===
In recent years, this reservoir is also given the nickname "the Thousand Island Lake of Hong Kong" due to the similarity in sceneries. The villages flooded by the water in the reservoir can still be seen when the water level drops low.
