= Shap Yi Wat =

Village in Hong Kong

Coordinates: 22.357594°N 114.198537°E

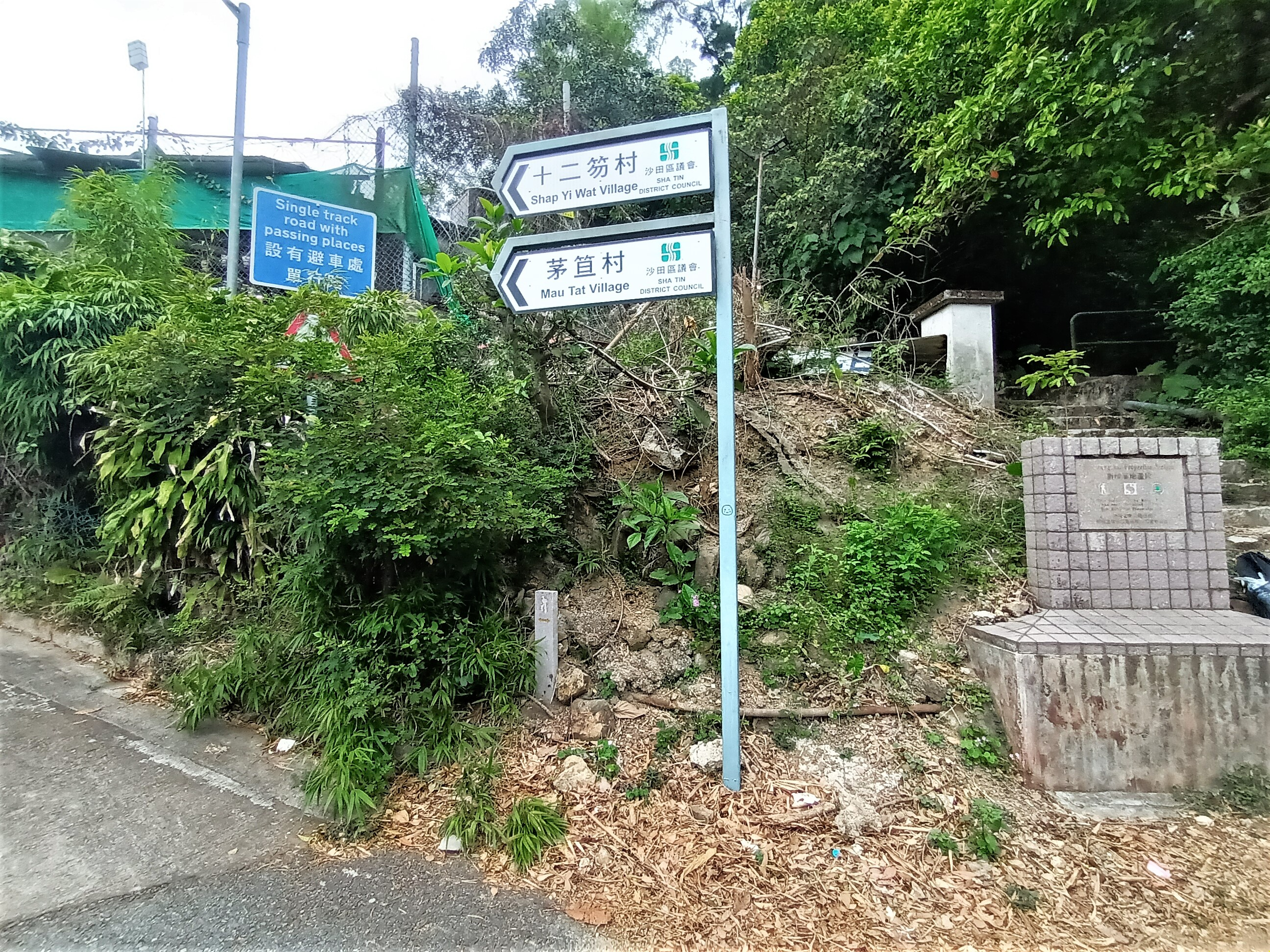
Signs at Sha Tin Pass indicating Shap Yi Wat Village and Mau Tat Village.

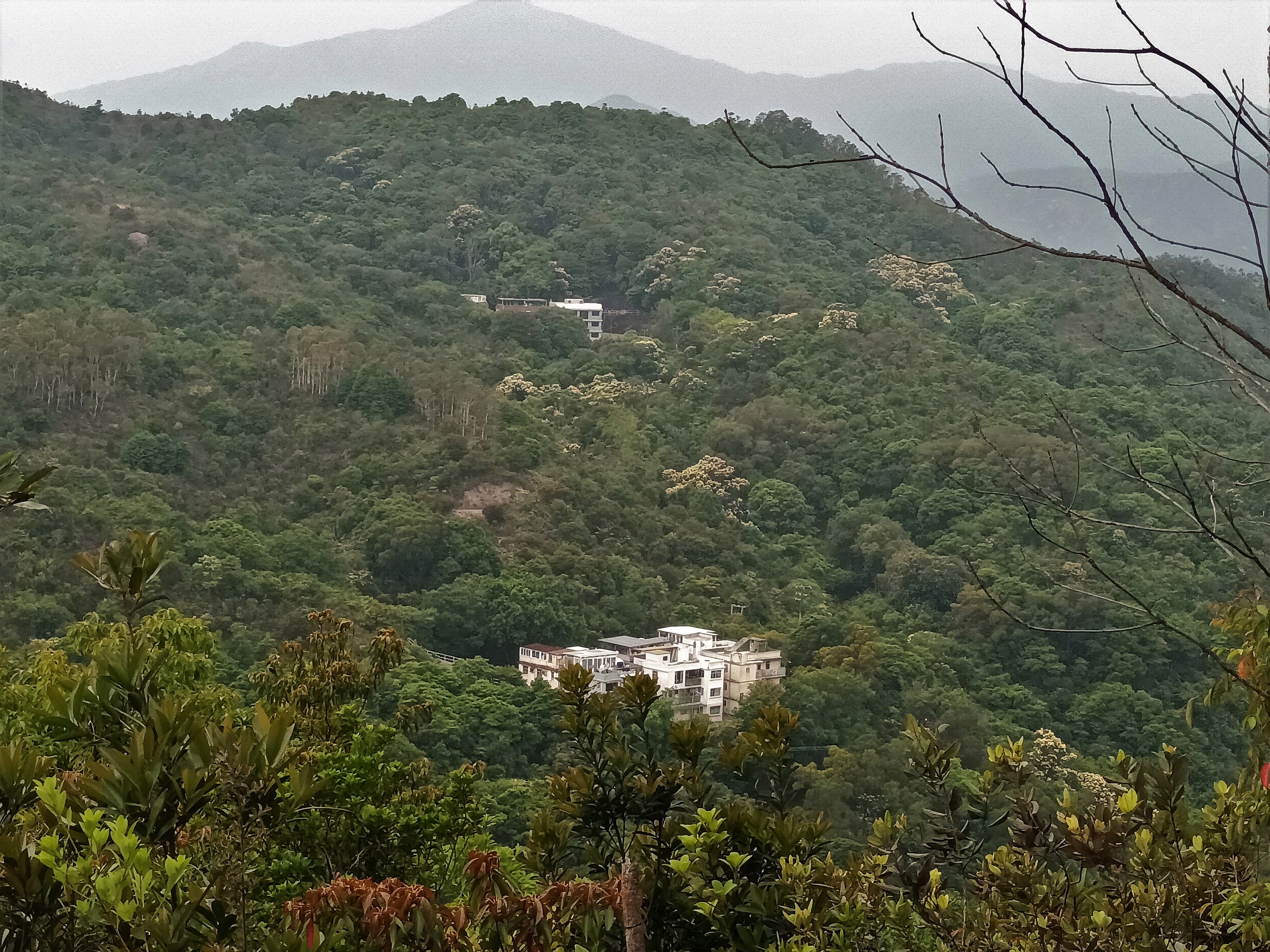
Shap Yi Wat viewed from the slope of Temple Hill.

Shap Yi Wat (Chinese: 十二笏) is a village in Sha Tin District, Hong Kong. It is a recognized village under the New Territories Small House Policy. It had a population of six in 1911.

== See also ==
- Kau Yeuk (Sha Tin)
- Sha Tin Pass
