= Shatin Pass Road =

Road in Hong Kong

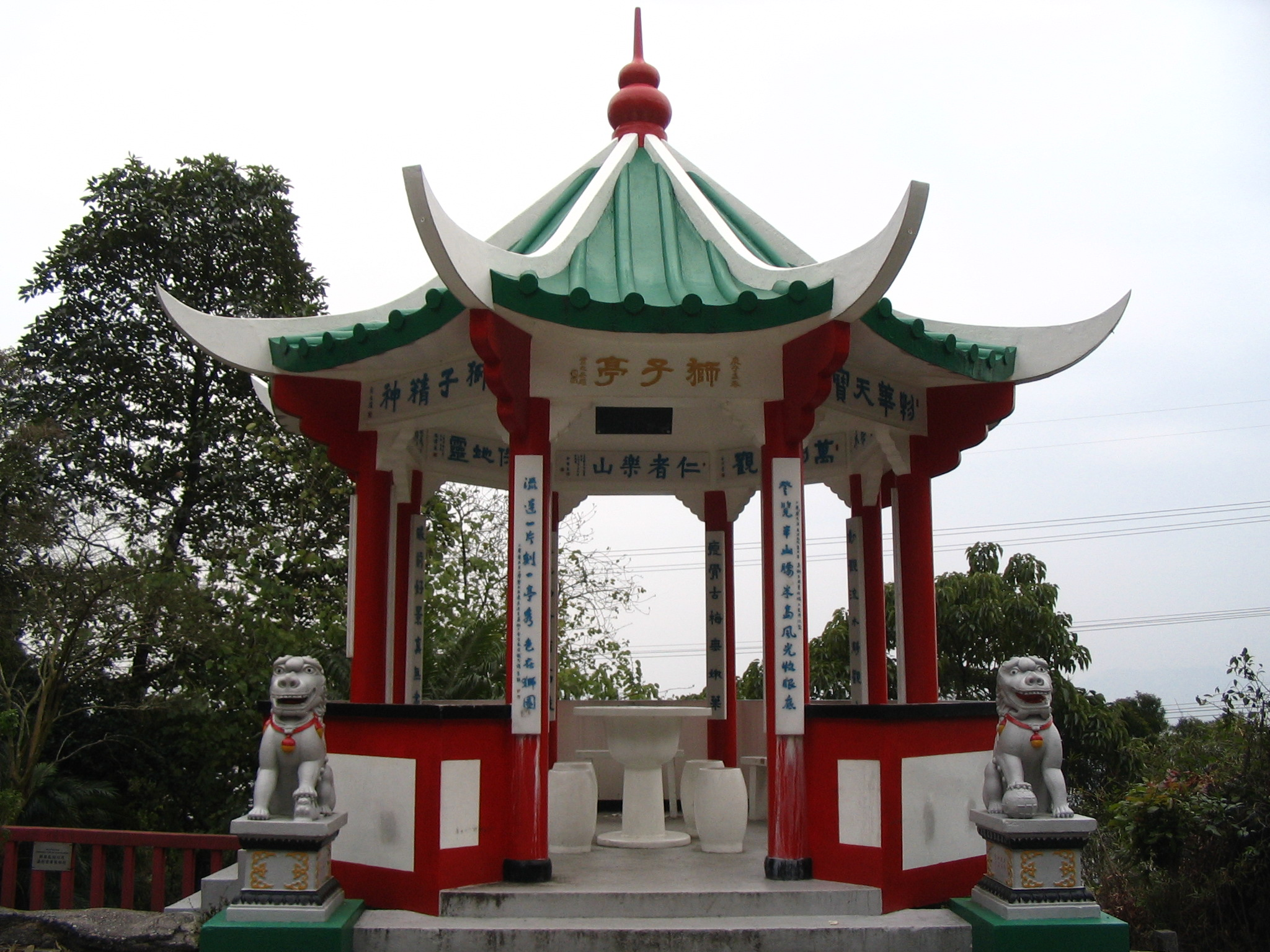
Lions Pavilion along Shatin Pass Road at Sha Tin Pass.

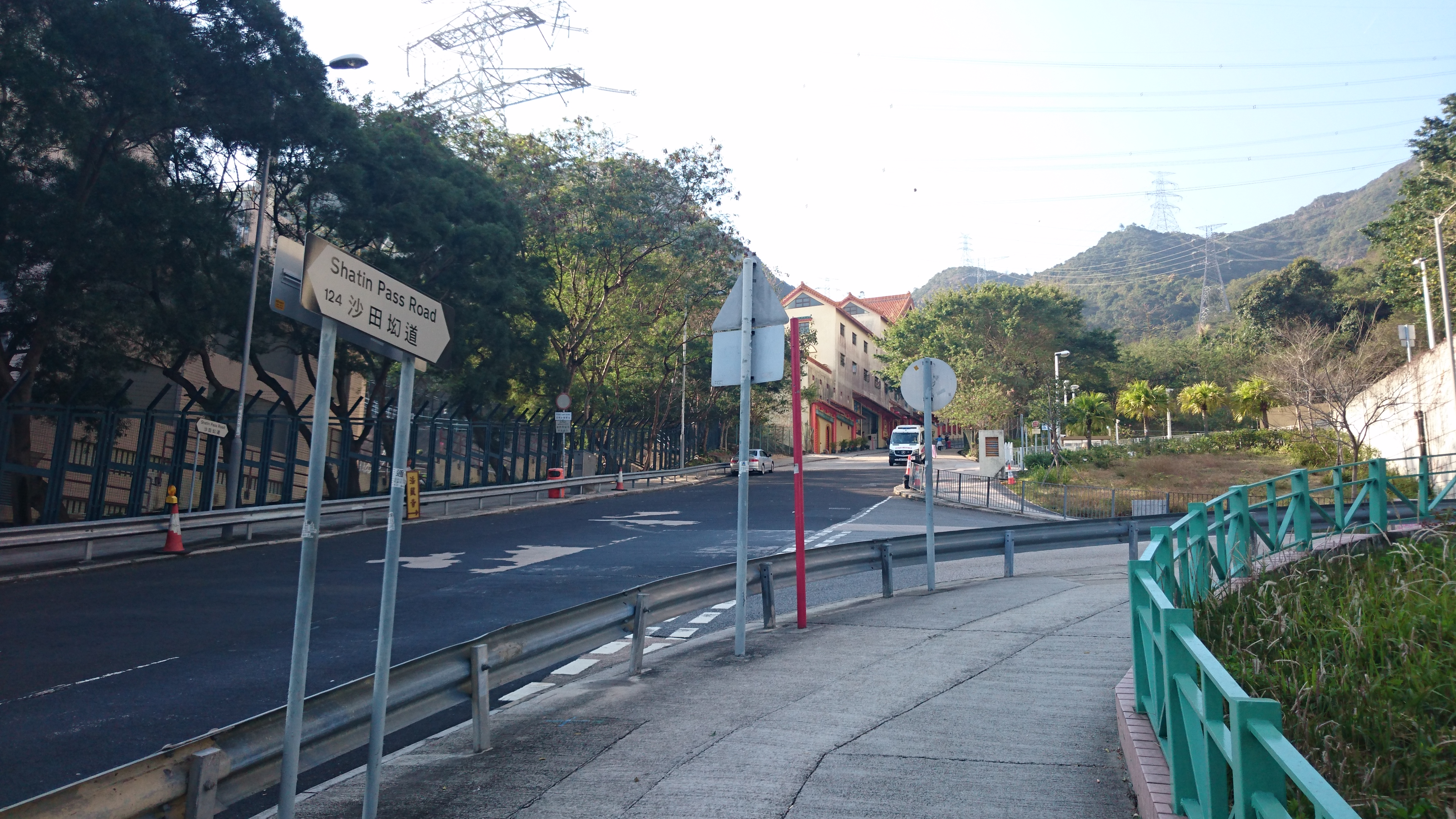
Shatin Pass Road at its junction with Tsz Wan Shan Road

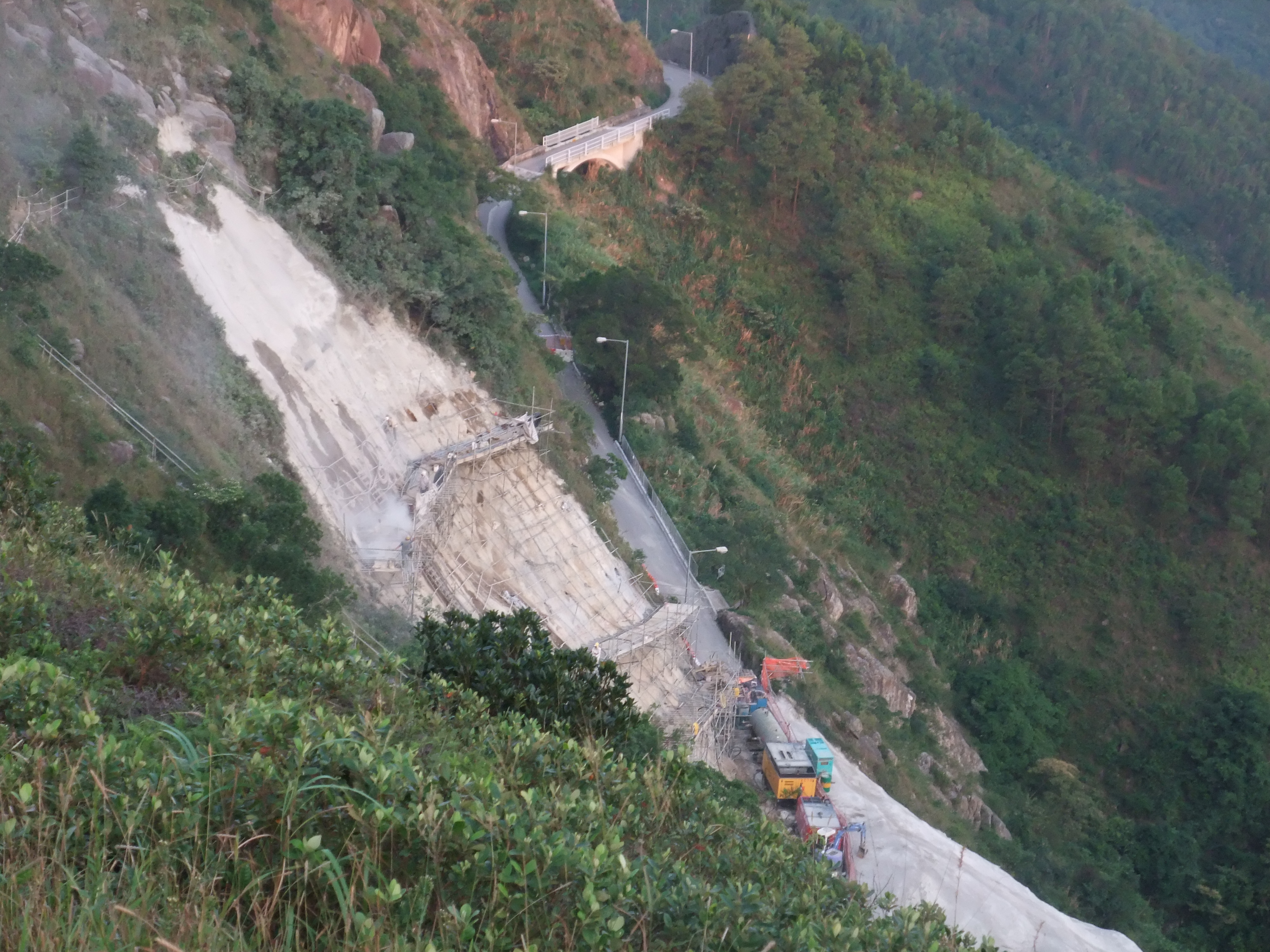
2008 work at Shatin Pass Road, following a landslide.

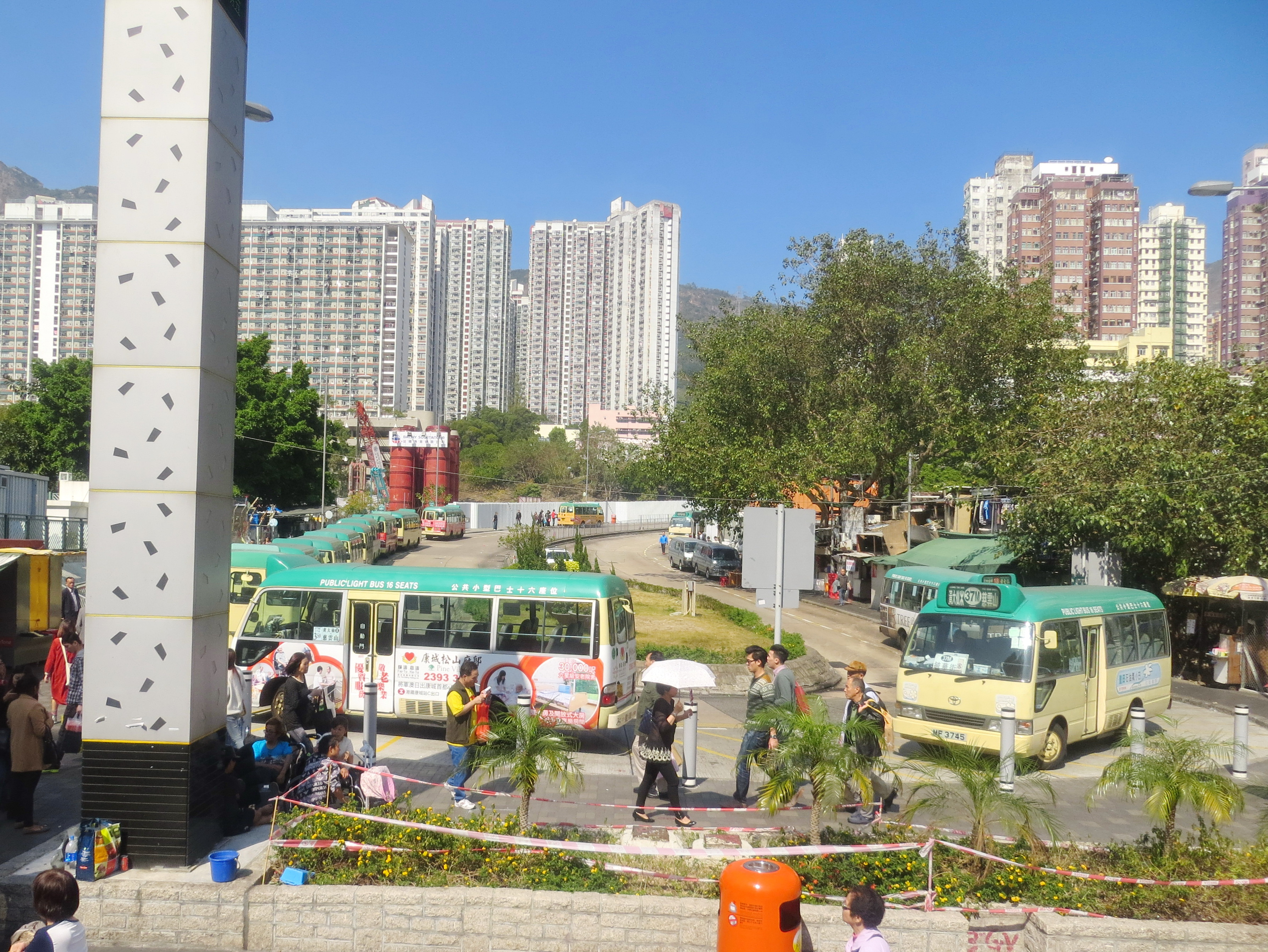
Southern end of Shatin Pass Road, near Lung Cheung Road.

Shatin Pass Road (Chinese: 沙田坳道) is a road in the Wong Tai Sin District of Kowloon, Hong Kong, linking the Wong Tai Sin area in the south to the junction of Fei Ngo Shan Road and Jat's Incline in the north. Along the way, it passes through the Tsz Wan Shan area and Sha Tin Pass.

The northern part of Shatin Pass Road, between Sha Tin Pass and the junction of Fei Ngo Shan Road and Jat's Incline, is part of the Stage 4 of the Wilson Trail and Section 5 of the MacLehose Trail. This section of the road also marks the border between Sha Tin District and Wong Tai Sin District.

== History ==
Shatin Pass Road was built by the British Army to access Sha Tin Pass and its remote villages in the Sha Tin District from Kowloon.

The road was damaged by a storm in June 2008, that caused a landslide. It reopened in December, 2008.

== Features along the road ==
In alphabetic order:

- Chuk Yuen (North) Estate (竹園北邨)
- Fat Jong Temple (慈雲山法藏寺)
- Lions Pavilion at Sha Tin Pass (沙田坳獅子亭)
- Lower Wong Tai Sin Estate (黃大仙下邨)
- Muk Lun Street Playground (睦鄰街遊樂場)
- Our Lady of Maryknoll Hospital (聖母醫院)
- Our Lady's College
- Sha Tin Pass
- Sha Tin Pass Estate (沙田坳邨)
- SKH Calvary Church (聖十架堂)
- Tsz Lok Estate (慈樂邨)
- Tung Wah Group of Hospitals Wong Tai Sin Hospital (東華三院黃大仙醫院)
- Wong Tai Sin Police Station (黃大仙區總部及分區警署)
- Ying Fuk Court (盈福苑)
