= Sha Tin Pass =

Mountain pass in Hong Kong

Coordinates: 22°21′18.94″N 114°11′57.53″E

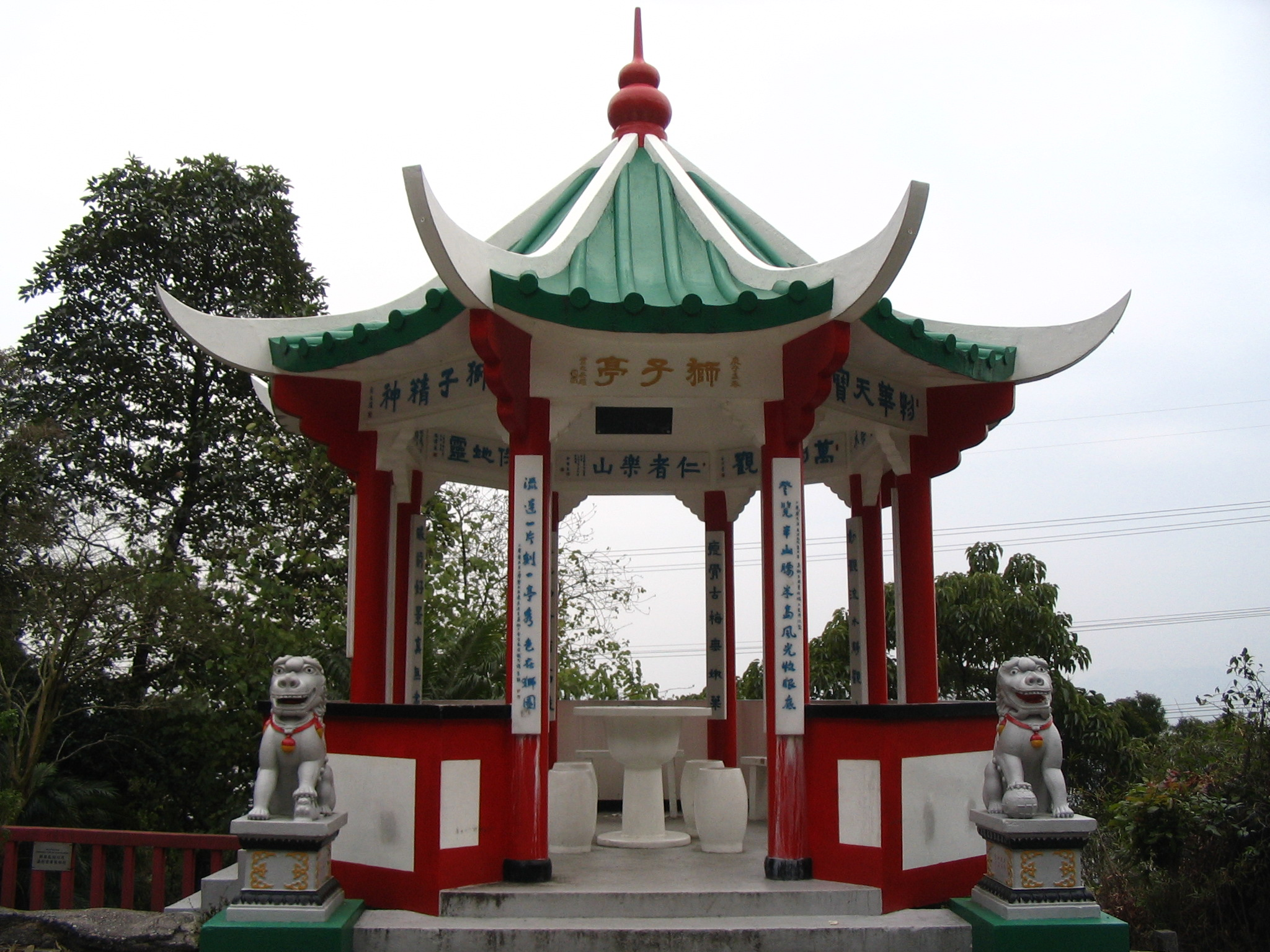
Lions Pavilion at Sha Tin Pass.

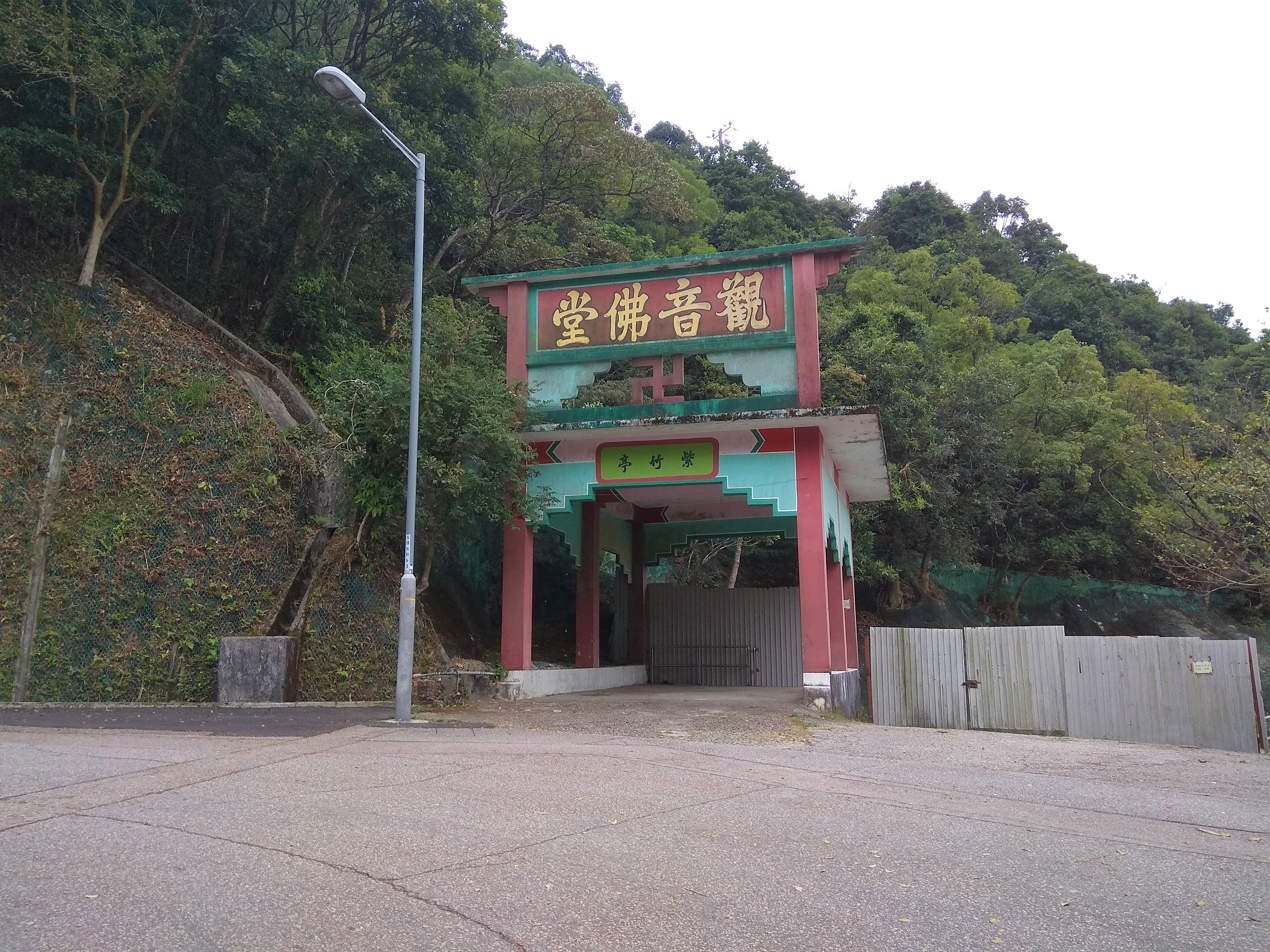
Tsz Chuk Pavilion (紫竹亭) along Shatin Pass Road at Shatin Pass.

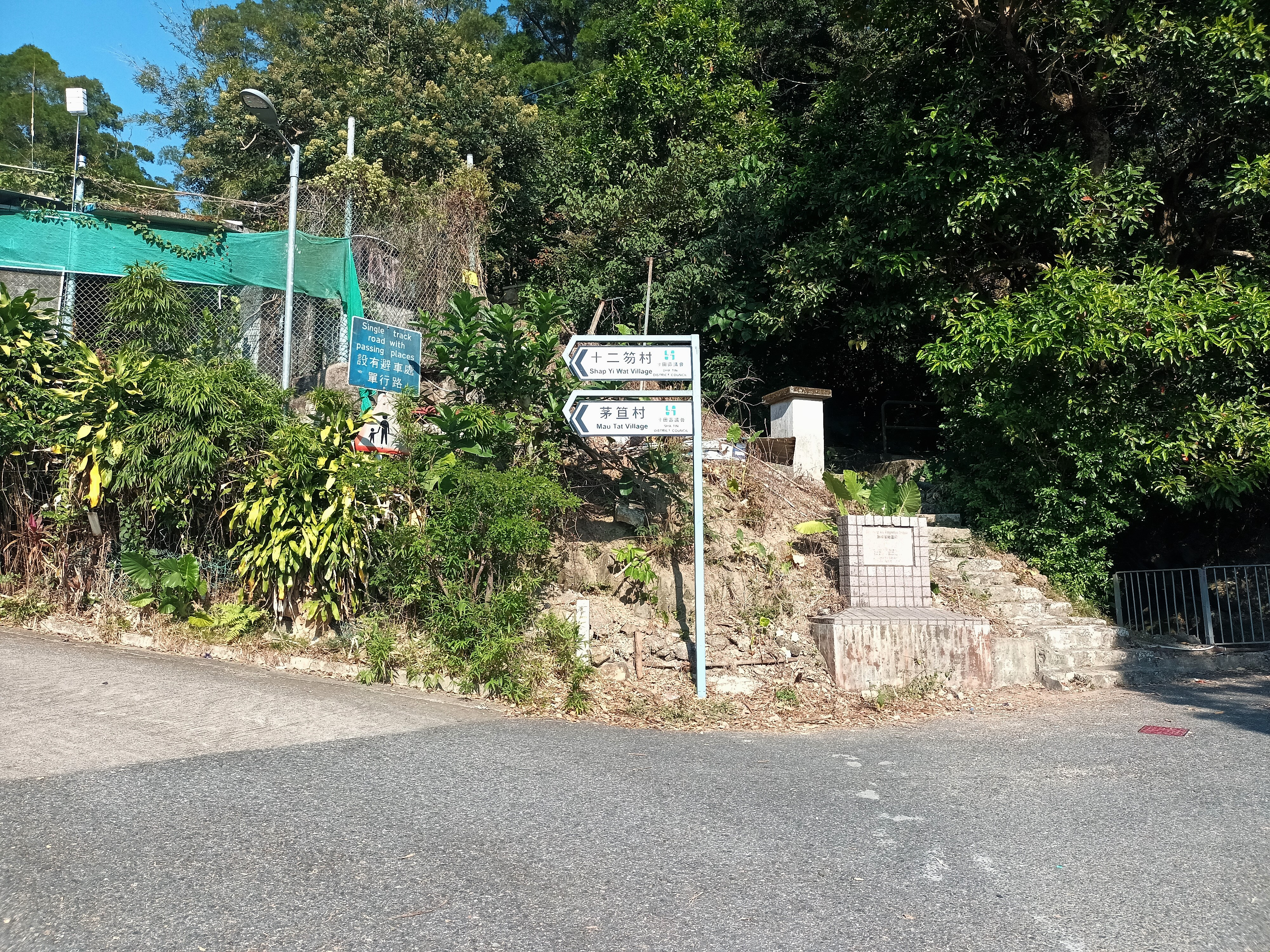
Signs along Shatin Pass Road at Shatin Pass indicating Mau Tat and Shap Yi Wat villages.

Sha Tin Pass (沙田坳; Cantonese Yale: sā tìhn au) or Shatin Pass, and sometimes Sha Tin Au (沙田凹), is a mountain pass between Temple Hill and Unicorn Ridge in Hong Kong. The pass is located north of the populous area of Tsz Wan Shan, and used to be the only path connecting Kowloon and Sha Tin.

The area is administratively divided along the border between Lion Rock Country Park and Tsz Chuk Pavilion (紫竹亭), with the area inside the mountain belonging to Sha Tin District, and the area under the foothill belonging to Wong Tai Sin District.

== History ==
Sha Tin Pass was one of major accesses from Kowloon to the south to Sha Tin to the north before the construction of roads and railway. A survey conducted in 1904 recorded 600 persons a day crossing Sha Tin Pass, including 280 of them "carrying goods". A substantial portion of these goods were fresh fish from Tolo Harbour being carried for sale at Kowloon City Market. The British Army built a road in 19th century, Shatin Pass Road from Kowloon to the pass and some villages in Sha Tin District but not to the town of Sha Tin.

== Features ==
Sheng Kung Hui has a site of Diocesan Youth Retreat House at the pass.

The villages of Mau Tat and Shap Yi Wat are located north of Sha Tin Pass.

The Kwun Yum Temple, Tsz Wan Shan is located in the vicinity of the pass, to its south. It can be accessed via Sha Tin Pass Road.

== Access ==
Sha Tin Pass can be accessed via Shatin Pass Road.

Stage 4 of Wilson Trail and Stage 5 of MacLehose Trail split at the pass.
