= Kowloon =

Area of Hong Kong

Coordinates: 22°19′N 114°11′E

Kowloon 九龍
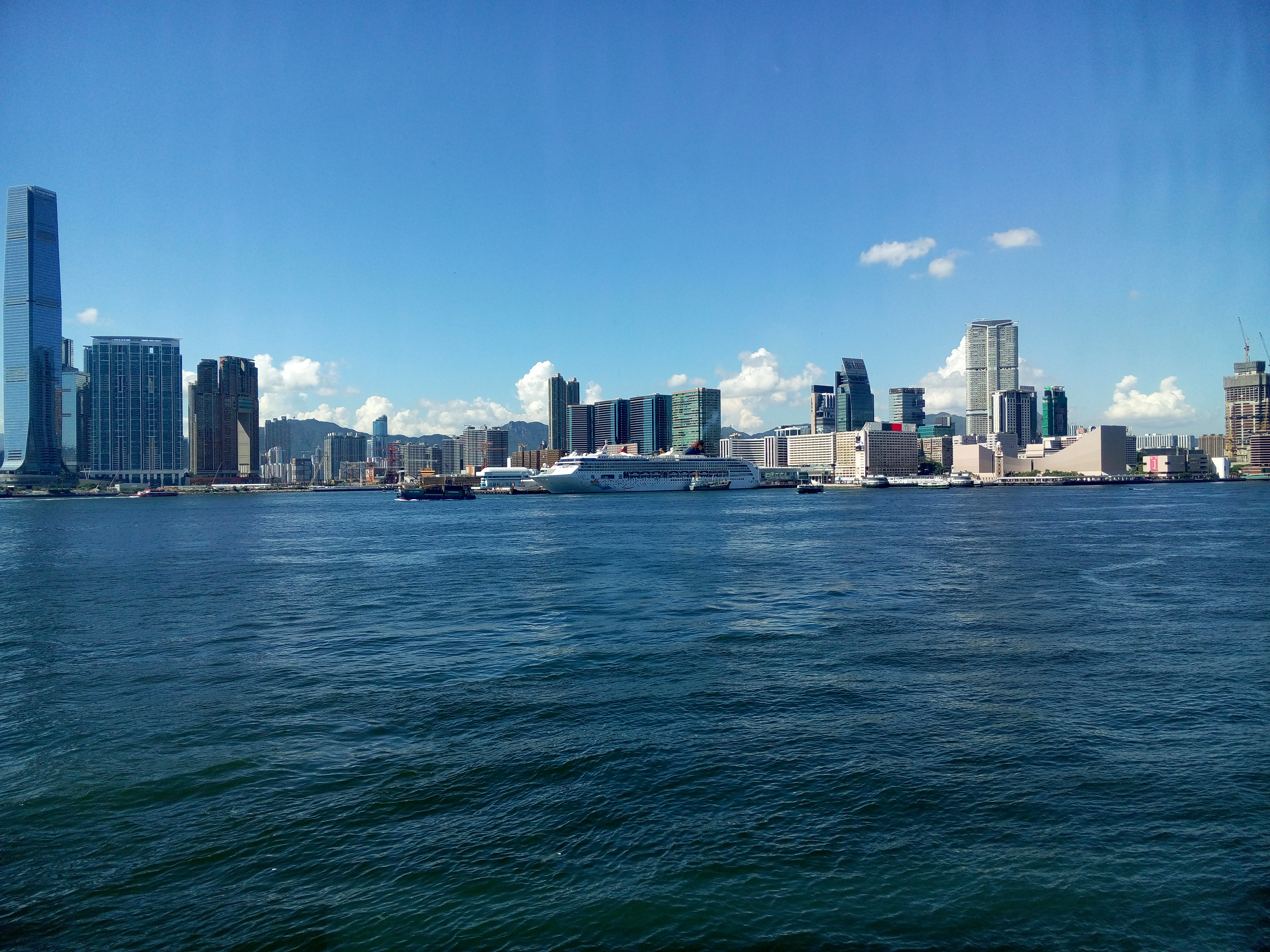
- Kowloon as viewed from Hong Kong Island

- Location within Hong Kong (in green)

Area
  - Land: 67 km^{2} (26 sq mi)

Population (2011)
  - Total: 2,108,419 (2.1 million)
  - Density: 43,033/km^{2} (111,450/sq mi)
- Time zone: UTC+8 (Hong Kong Time)

Kowloon
- Traditional Chinese: 九龍
- Simplified Chinese: 九龙
- Cantonese Yale: Gáulùhng
- Literal meaning: "Nine Dragons"
Transcriptions
Standard Mandarin
- Hanyu Pinyin: Jǐulóng
- Bopomofo: ㄐㄧㄡˇ ㄌㄨㄥˊ
- Wade–Giles: Chiu^{3}-lung^{2}
- Tongyong Pinyin: Jiǒulóng
- IPA: [tɕjòʊ.lʊ̌ŋ]
Wu
- Wugniu: cieu^{3} lon^{2}
- IPA: Shanghainese: [tɕiɤ˧ loŋ˦]
Hakka
- Romanization: giu^{3}lung^{2}
Yue: Cantonese
- Yale Romanization: Gáulùhng
- Jyutping: gau^{2} lung^{4}
- IPA: [kɐw˧˥ lʊŋ˩]

Kowloon (/ˌkaʊˈluːn/), formerly Kaulung, is one of the three areas of Hong Kong, along with Hong Kong Island, and the New Territories. It is an urban area comprising the Kowloon Peninsula and New Kowloon. It has a population of 2,019,533 and a population density of 43,033/km^{2} (111,450/sq mi) in 2006. It is the smallest, second most populous, and most densely populated of the divisions.

== Location ==
Kowloon is located directly north of Hong Kong Island across Victoria Harbour. It is bordered by the Lei Yue Mun strait to the east, Mei Foo Sun Chuen, Butterfly Valley, and Stonecutter's Island to the west, a mountain range, including Tate's Cairn and Lion Rock to the north and Victoria Harbour to the south.

== Administration ==
Kowloon comprises the following districts:

- Kowloon City
- Kwun Tong
- Sham Shui Po
- Wong Tai Sin
- Yau Tsim Mong

== Name ==
The name Kowloon (Chinese: 九龍 lit. "Nine Dragons") alludes to eight mountains and a Chinese emperor: Kowloon Peak, Tung Shan, Tate's Cairn, Temple Hill, Unicorn Ridge, Lion Rock, Beacon Hill, Crow's Nest and Emperor Bing of Song. It has been variously transcribed and translated over the years as Kaulung or Kawloong, among others .

== History ==
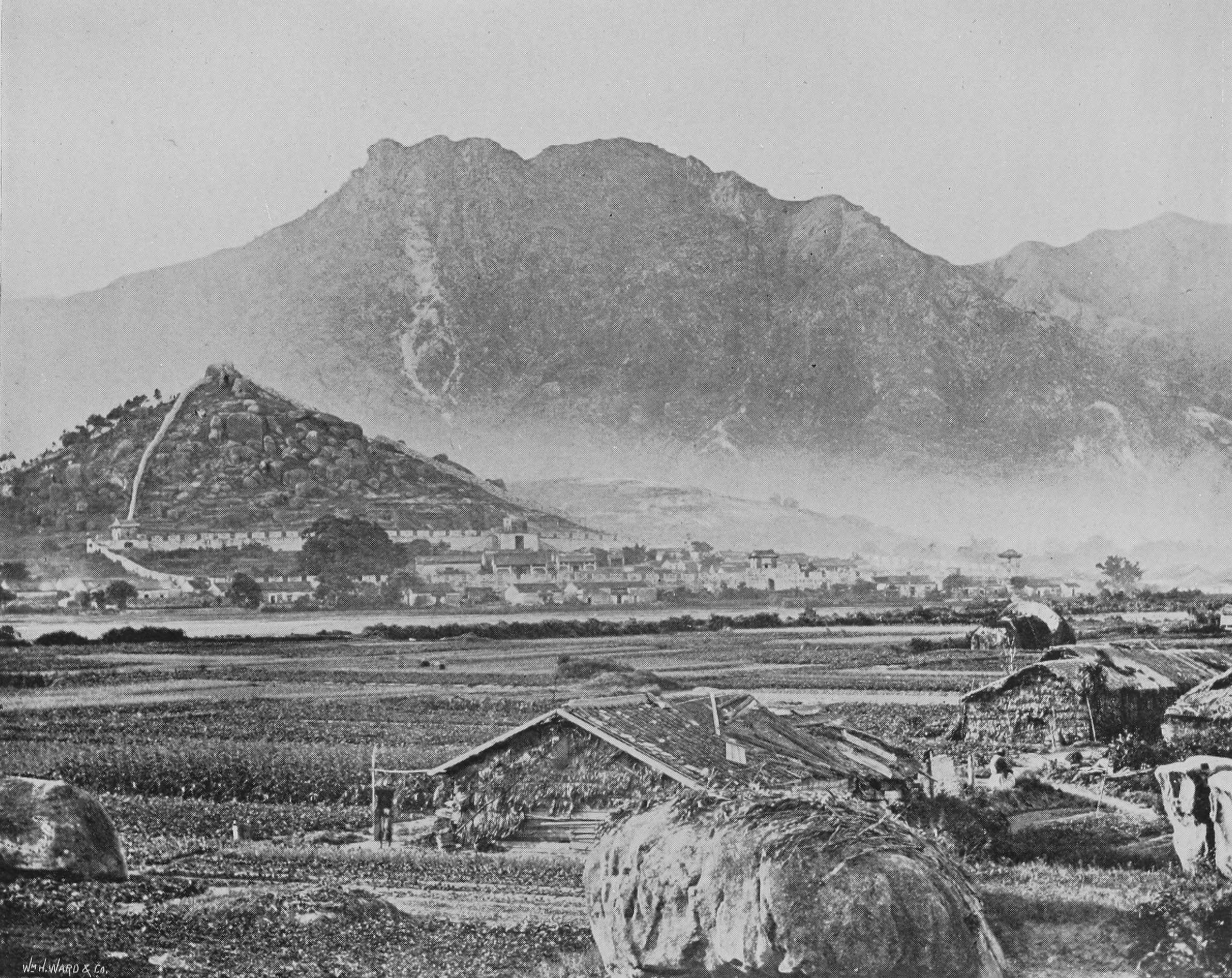
Kowloon c. 1868, depicting the Qing-era Kowloon Walled City and Lion Rock (in the background)

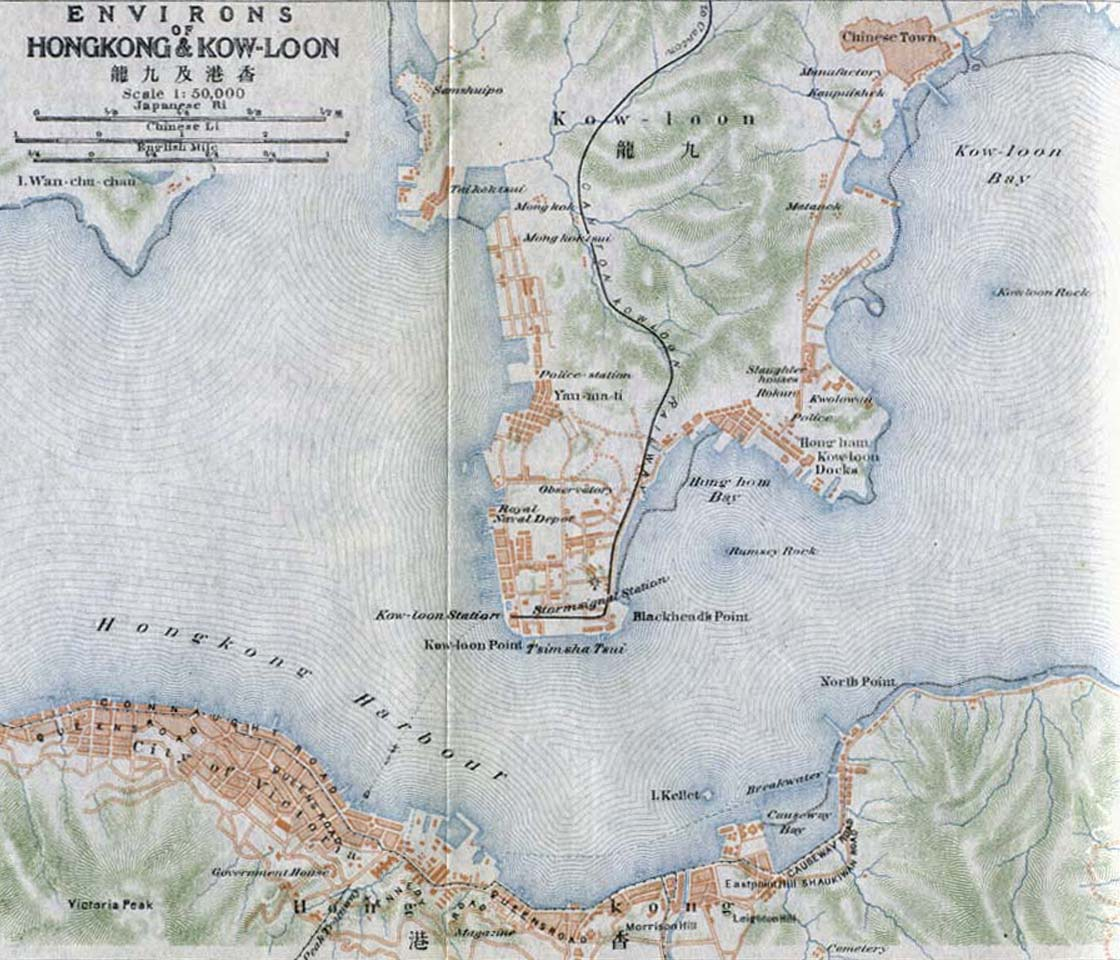
Map of Kowloon in 1915

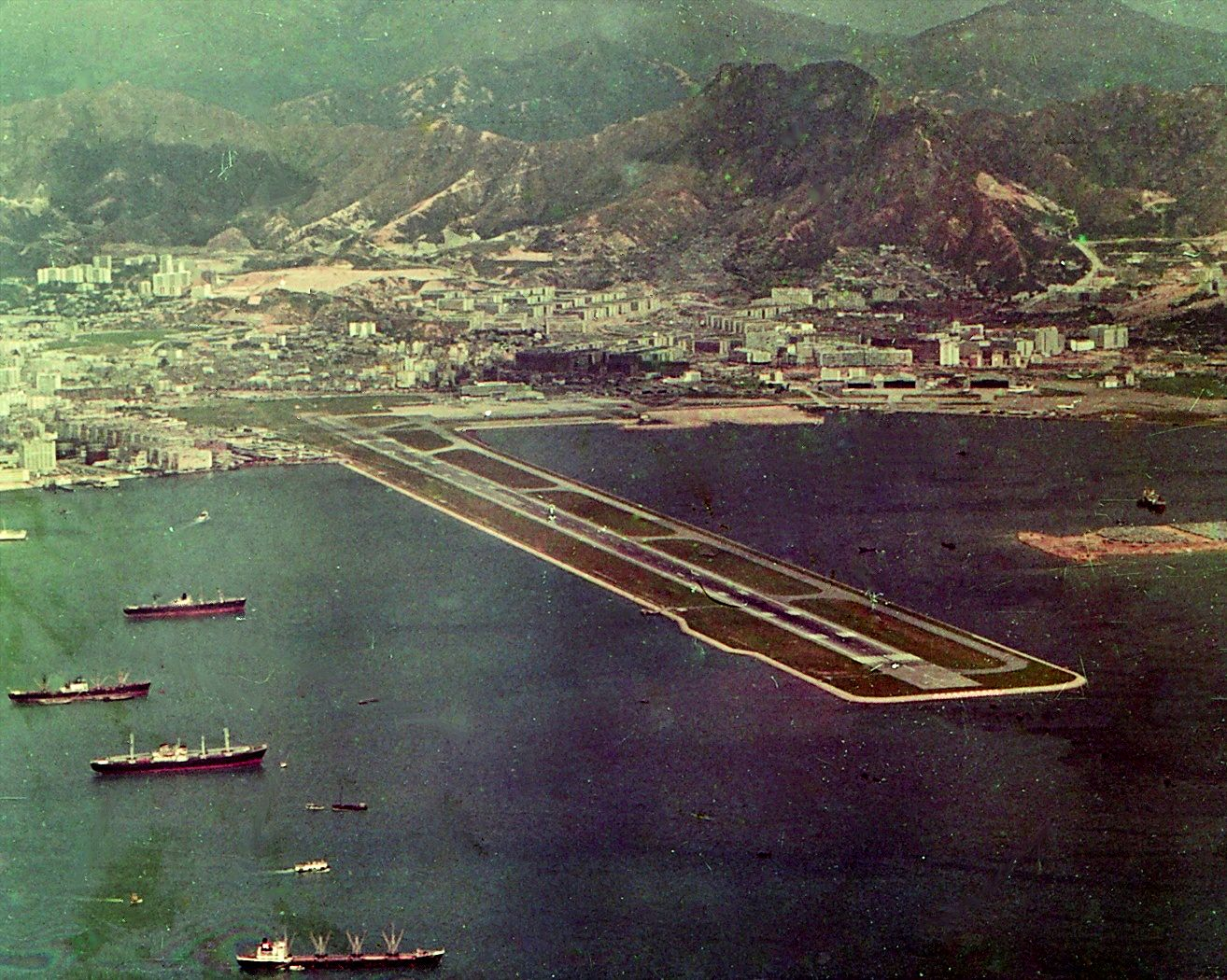
Hong Kong's old airport, Kai Tak, was located in Kowloon Bay.

The part of Kowloon south of Boundary Street, together with Stonecutters Island, was ceded by Qing China to the United Kingdom under the Convention of Peking of 1860. For many years the area remained largely undeveloped and was used by the British mainly for tiger-hunting expeditions. The part of Kowloon north of Boundary Street (New Kowloon) was leased by the British as part of the New Territories under the 1898 Second Convention of Peking for 99 years. Within New Kowloon is Kowloon City, an area of Hong Kong where the Kowloon Walled City used to be located. The Kowloon Walled City itself was demolished in 1993. The same area was called Kwun Fu Cheung (官富場) during the Song dynasty (960–1279). "New Kowloon" has remained part of the New Territories.

Statutorily, "Kowloon" is only the area south of Boundary Street and Stonecutters Island, but in common use, New Kowloon is not regarded as part of the New Territories, but as an integral part of the Kowloon urban area whether north or south of Boundary Street.

Large-scale development of Kowloon began in the early 20th century, with the construction of the Kowloon-Canton Railway and the Kowloon Wharf, but because of the close proximity of Kowloon's built-up area to Kai Tak Airport, building construction was limited by flight paths. As a result, compared to Hong Kong Island, Kowloon had a much lower skyline. After World War II, Kowloon became extremely congested when slums for refugees from the newly-established People's Republic of China gave way to public housing estates, mixed with private residential, commercial, and industrial areas.

The area of reclaimed land that is now known as West Kowloon was once home to a dockyard for the Royal Navy.

The 1911 census recorded a population of 7,306, with most being Hakka. The invasion of China by Japan in 1937 caused the population of Kowloon to grow drastically. Between 1937 and 1939, 750,000 refugees arrived in Kowloon and nearby areas, with many not having residence.

== Demographics ==
As of 2011, 2,108,419 people lived in Kowloon.

About 94.2% of Kowloon's residents are of Han Chinese ethnicity. The largest ethnic minority groups are Indonesians (1.8%), Filipinos (1.5%), Indians (0.5%), Nepalese (0.4%), and British (0.3%). Around 86% of Kowloon's residents use Cantonese as their usual language, while 2.3% use English and 1.2% use Mandarin.

== Localities ==
Kowloon comprises these localities of Hong Kong:

- Anderson Road area
- Austin
- Cha Kwo Ling
- Cheung Sha Wan
- Diamond Hill
- Jordan
- Hammer Hill
- Hung Hom
- Ho Man Tin
- Kai Tak
- Kowloon Bay
- Kowloon City
- Kowloon Tong
- Kwun Tong
- Lai Chi Kok
- Lam Tin
- Lei Yue Mun
- Ma Tau Wai
- Mong Kok
- Ngau Chi Wan
- Ngau Tau Kok
- Prince Edward
- San Po Kong
- Sau Mau Ping
- Sham Shui Po
- Shek Kip Mei
- Tai Kok Tsui
- To Kwa Wan
- Tsim Sha Tsui
- Tsz Wan Shan
- West Kowloon
- Wong Tai Sin
- Yau Ma Tei
- Yau Tong

== Education ==
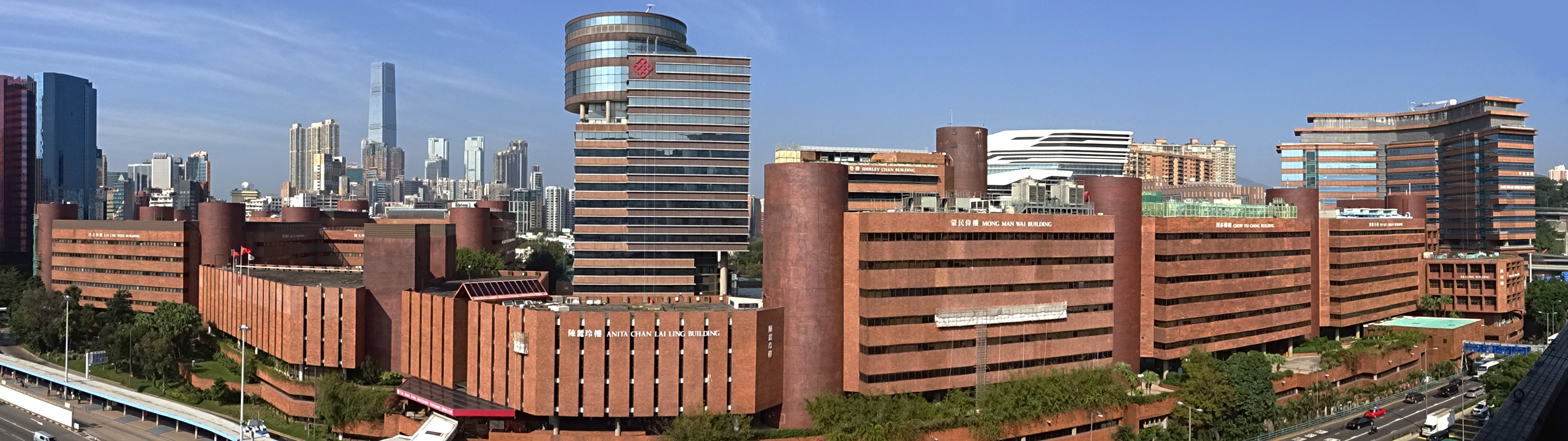
The Hong Kong Polytechnic University in Hung Hom

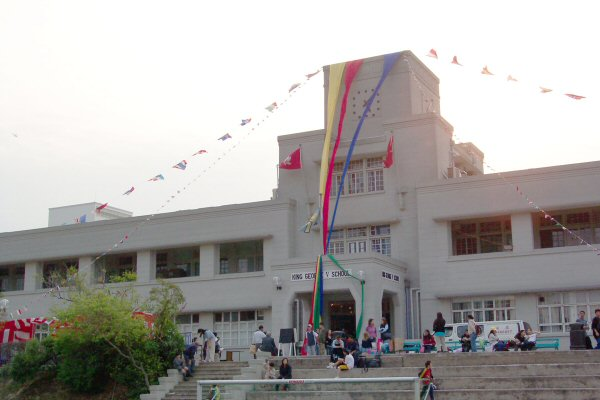
King George V School, Homantin

Lists of primary and secondary schools in Kowloon by district:

- List of schools in Kowloon City District
- List of schools in Kwun Tong District
- List of schools in Sham Shui Po District
- List of schools in Wong Tai Sin District
- List of schools in Yau Tsim Mong District

=== Tertiary education ===
- City University of Hong Kong
- Hong Kong Polytechnic University
- Hong Kong Baptist University
- Hong Kong Metropolitan University
- Tung Wah College
- Hong Kong Nang Yan College of Higher Education
- Gratia Christian College

== Notable people ==
- Anita Mui (1963–2003), singer and actress
- Jackson Wang (born 1994), musician
- Sean Parry (born 1987), cricketer

== Transport ==
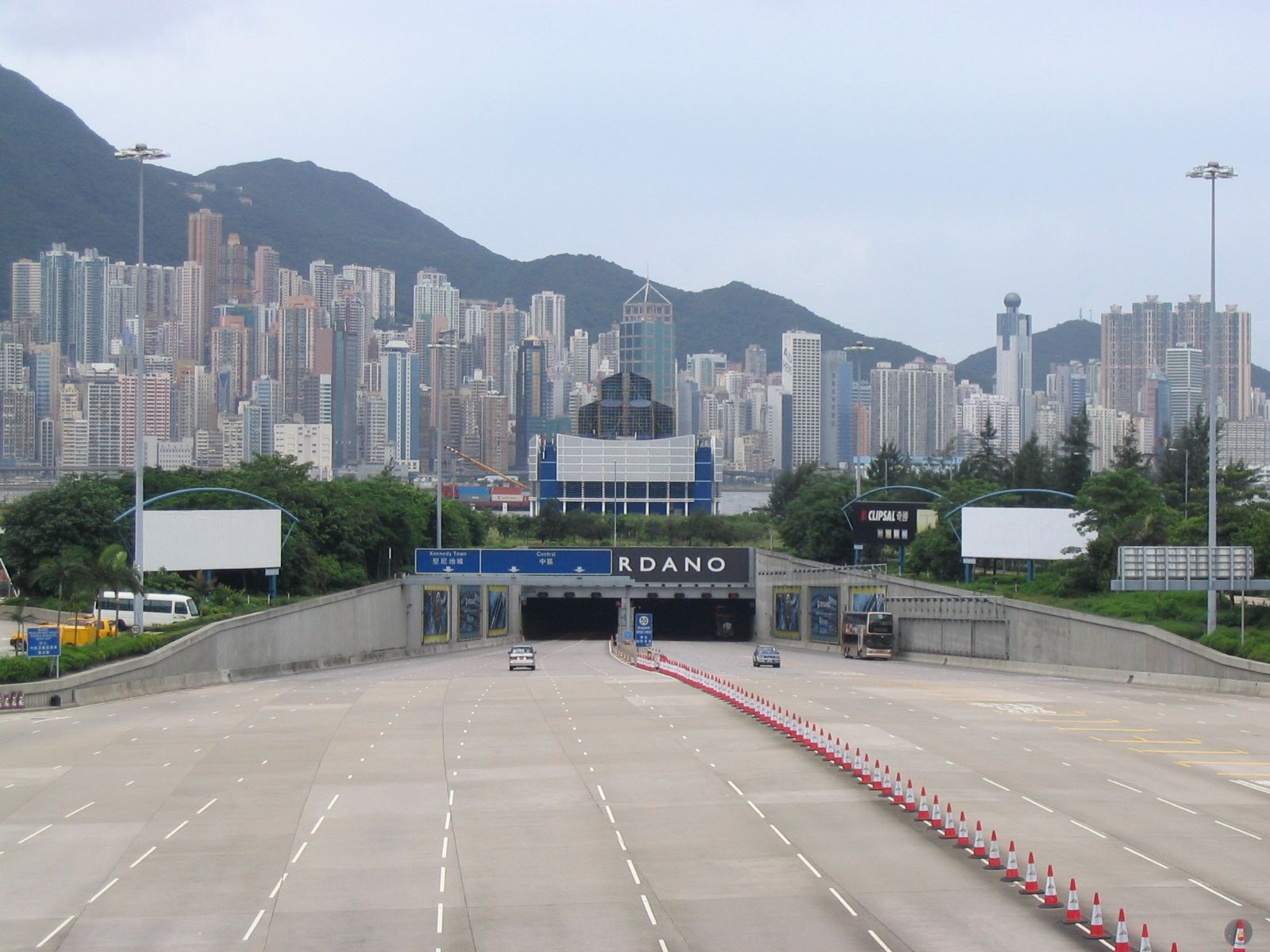
Western Harbour Crossing, one of the tunnels that link Kowloon with Hong Kong Island

Kowloon is connected to Hong Kong Island by two road-only tunnels (the Cross-Harbour Tunnel and the Western Harbour Crossing), three MTR railway tunnels (Tsuen Wan line, Tung Chung line/Airport Express and East Rail) and one combined road and MTR rail link tunnel (Eastern Harbour Tunnel, containing the Tseung Kwan O line and road traffic in separate parallel conduits). No bridges connect the island and Kowloon.

== Gallery ==
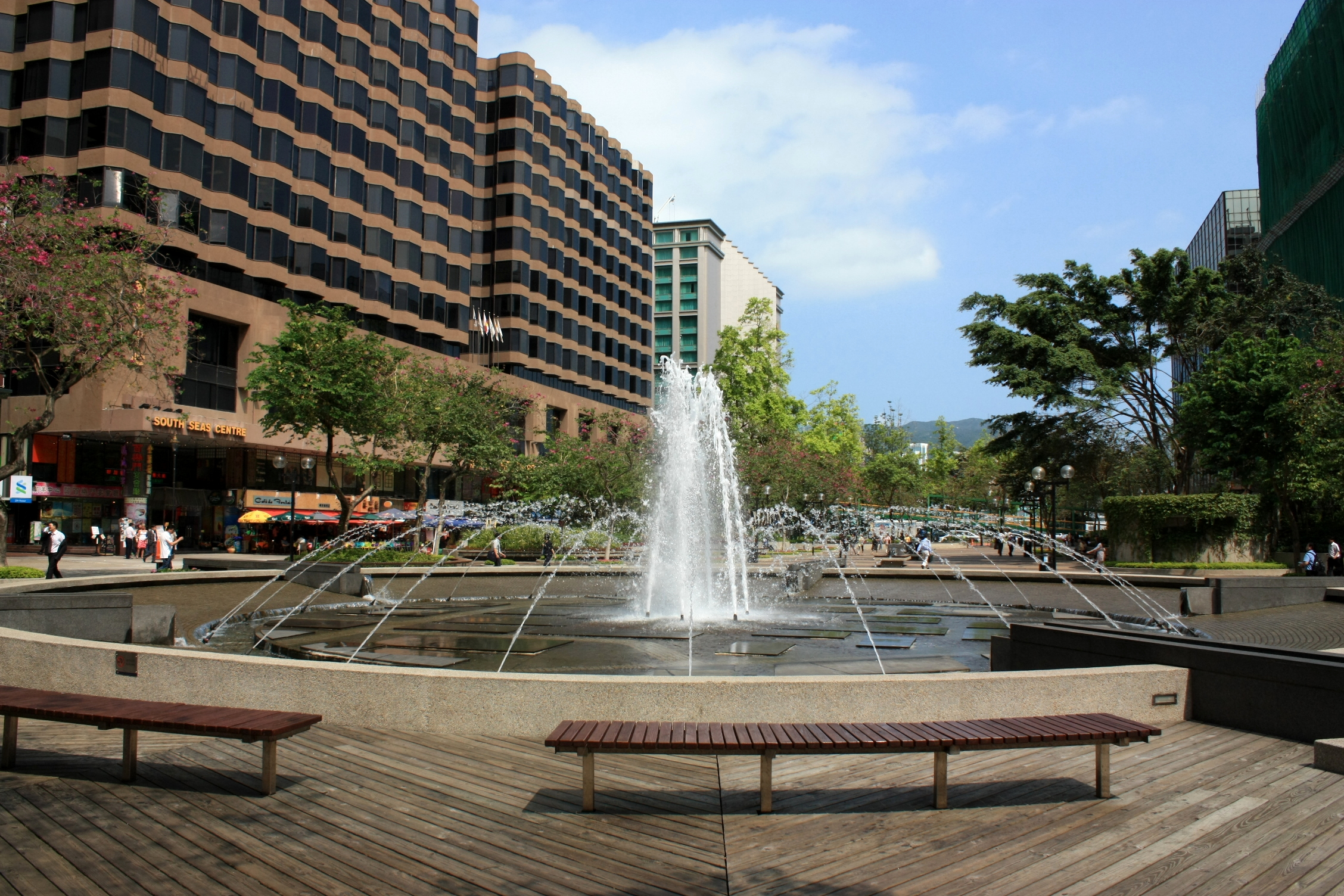
Urban Council Centenary Garden fountain, Tsim Sha Tsui

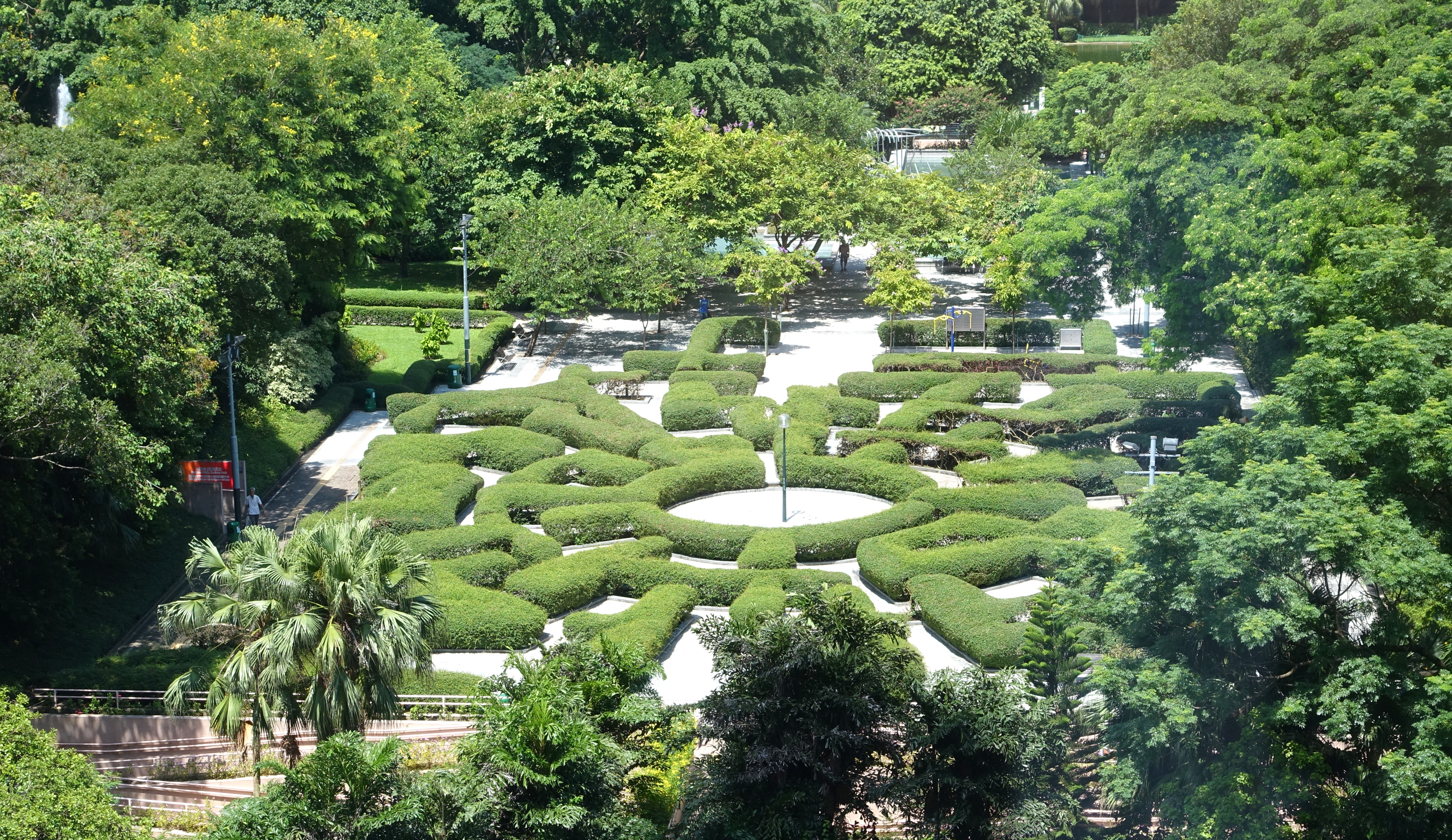
Maze Garden, Kowloon Park, Tsim Sha Tsui

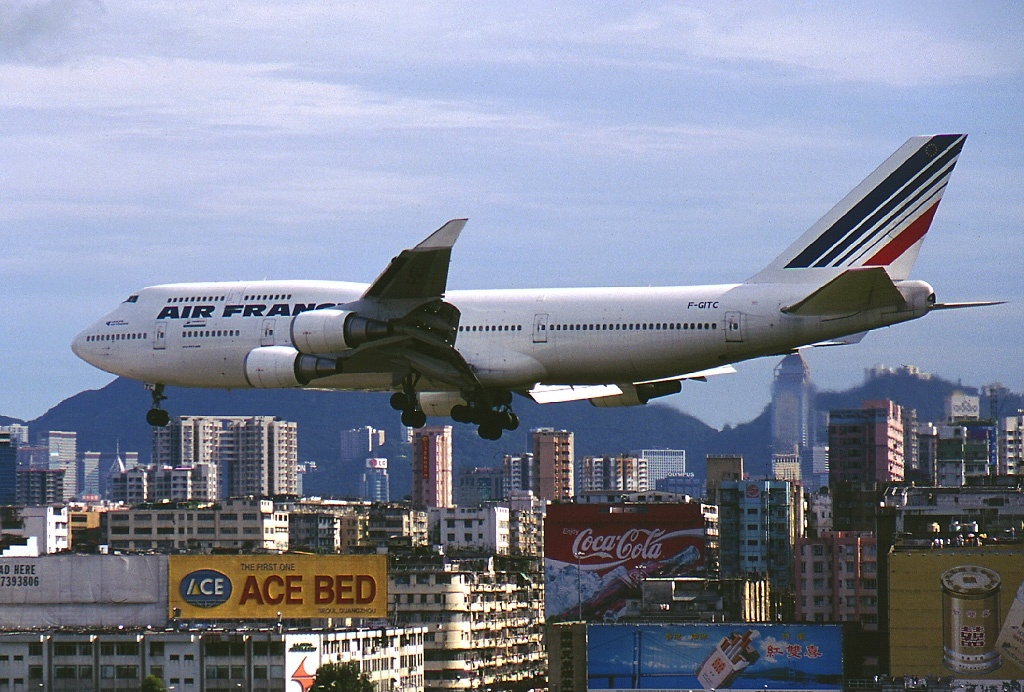
An Air France Boeing 747 passing above Kowloon, prior to landing at the old airport in 1998.

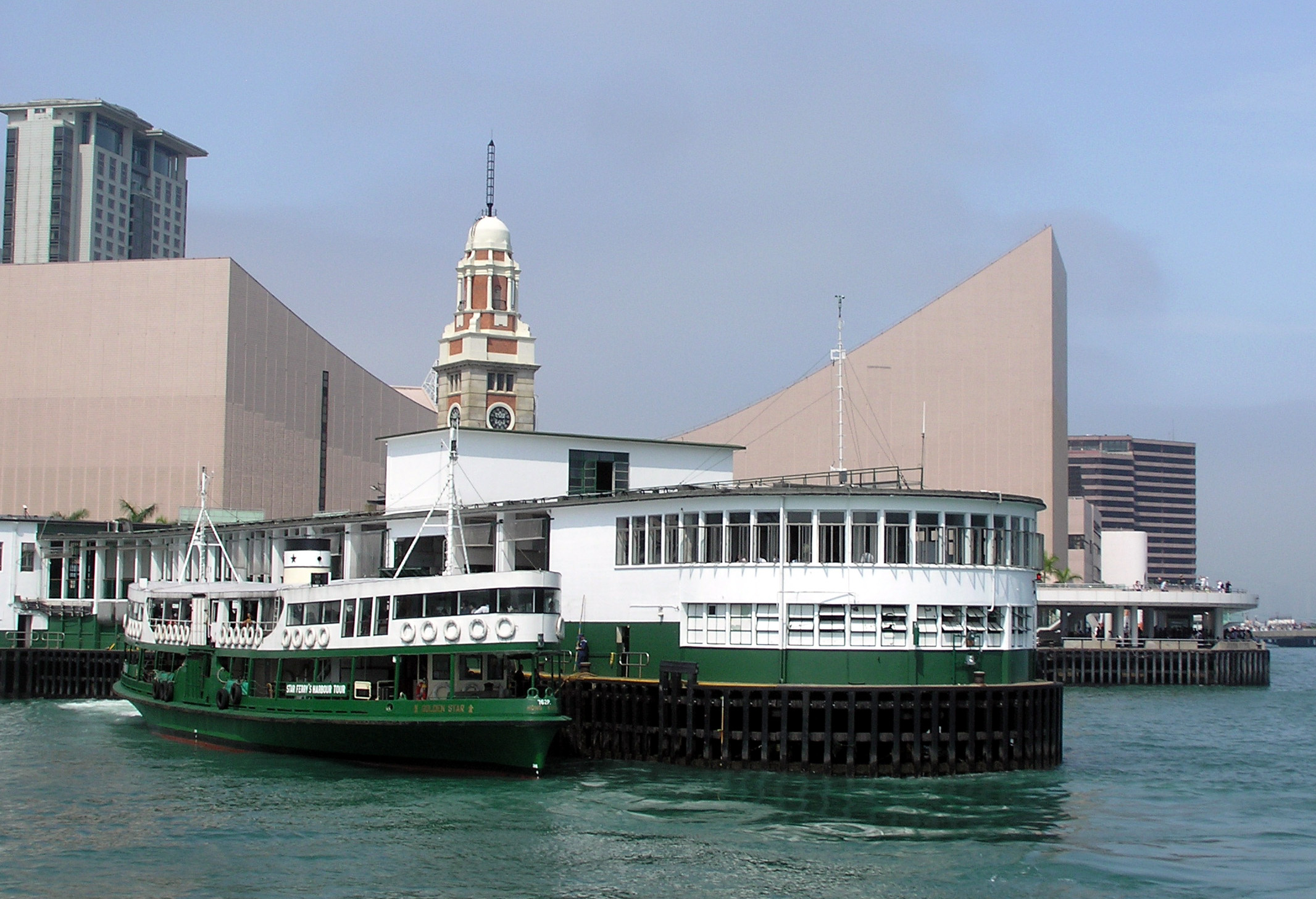
Star Ferry Pier, with the Hong Kong Cultural Centre and Tsim Sha Tsui Clock Tower in the background.

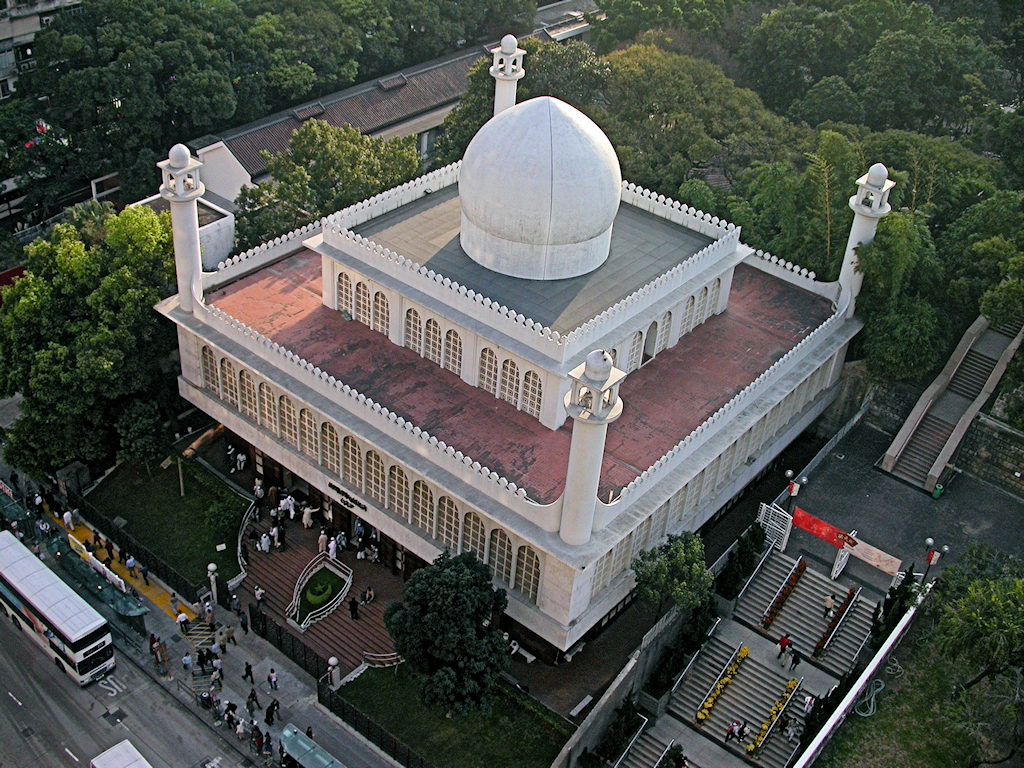
Kowloon Masjid and Islamic Centre

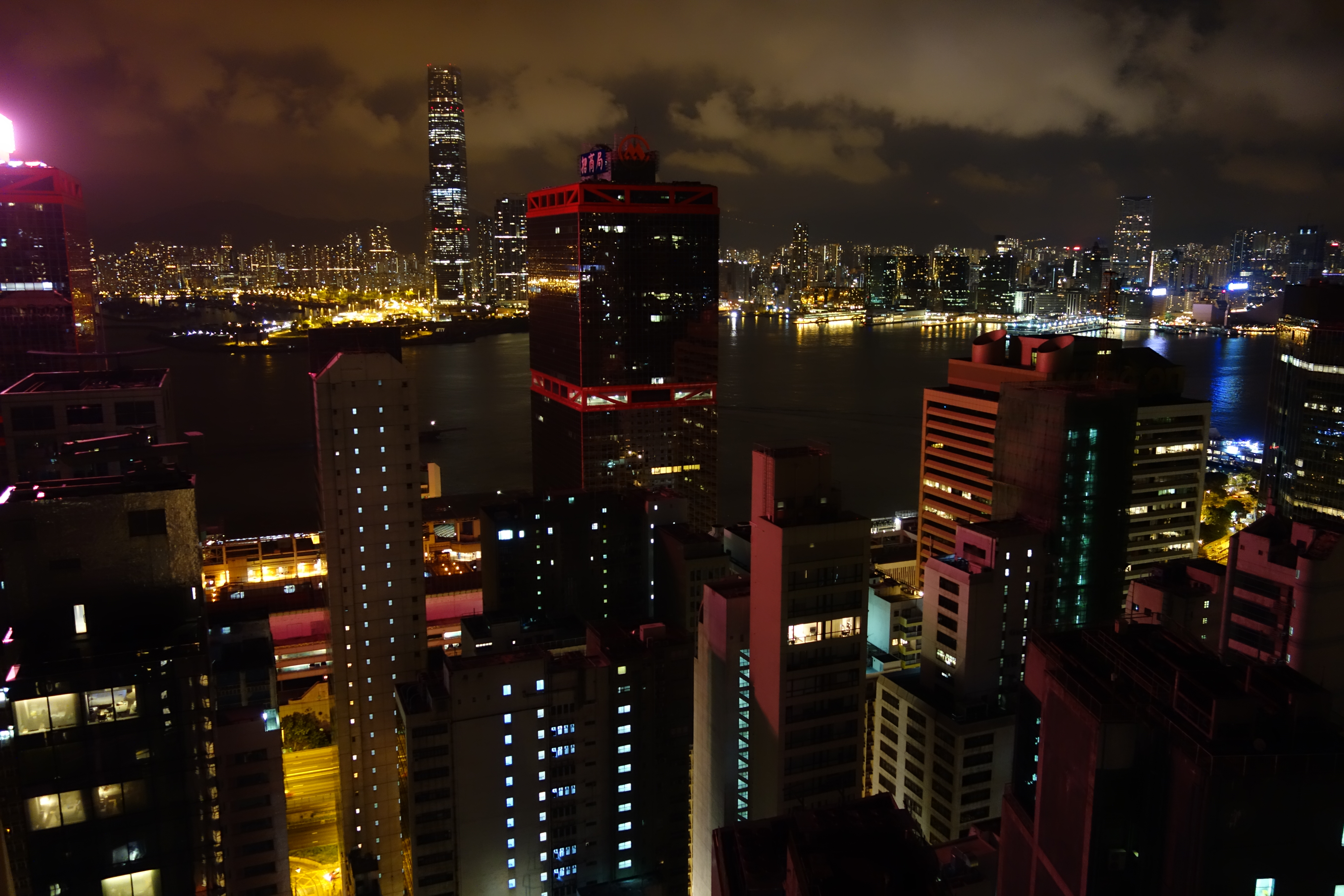
Night view of Kowloon from Hong Kong Island
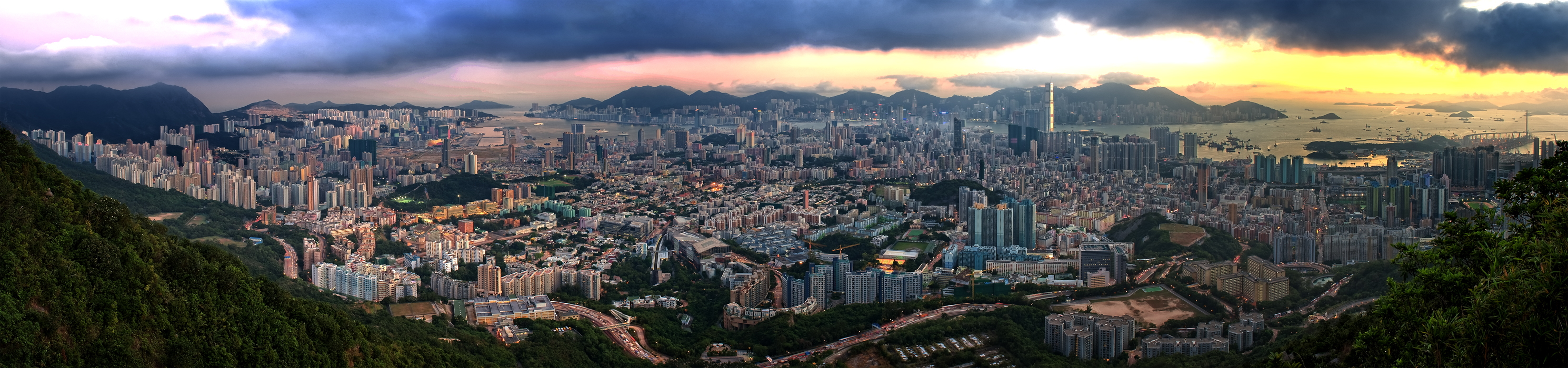
Kowloon Peninsula panorama
