= Unicorn Ridge =

Mountain in Hong Kong

Unicorn Ridge, Hong Kong
- 雞胸山
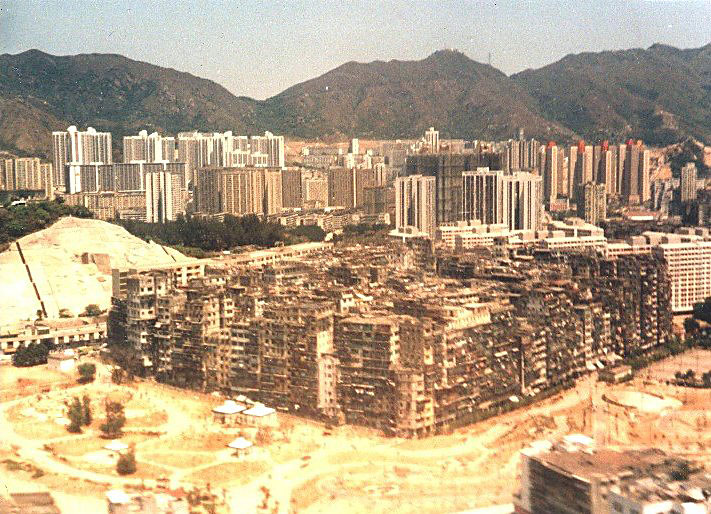
- Unicorn Ridge can be seen in the background, foreground is the now-demolished Kowloon Walled City

Highest point
- Elevation: 437 m (1,434 ft)
- Coordinates: 22°21′22″N 114°11′40″E

Geography
- Location within Hong Kong
- Location: Hong Kong

Unicorn Ridge (Chinese: 雞胸山; lit. 'Chicken Breast Mountain') is a mountain in Hong Kong at 437 metres (1,434 ft) in height. It is one of the Eight Mountains of the Kowloon Ridge and falls within Lion Rock Country Park. Sha Tin Pass lies between Unicorn Ridge and Temple Hill.

The summit of Unicorn Ridge is just above MacLehose Trail, west of Sha Tin Pass.

== See also ==
- Gin Drinkers Line
- Eight Mountains of Kowloon
