= Tsz Wan Shan =

Residential area in Kowloon, Hong Kong

Coordinates: 22.34943°N 114.19949°E

- Traditional Chinese: 慈雲山
- Simplified Chinese: 慈云山
Transcriptions
Standard Mandarin
- Hanyu Pinyin: Cí Yún Shān
Yue: Cantonese
- Jyutping: ci4 wan4 saan1

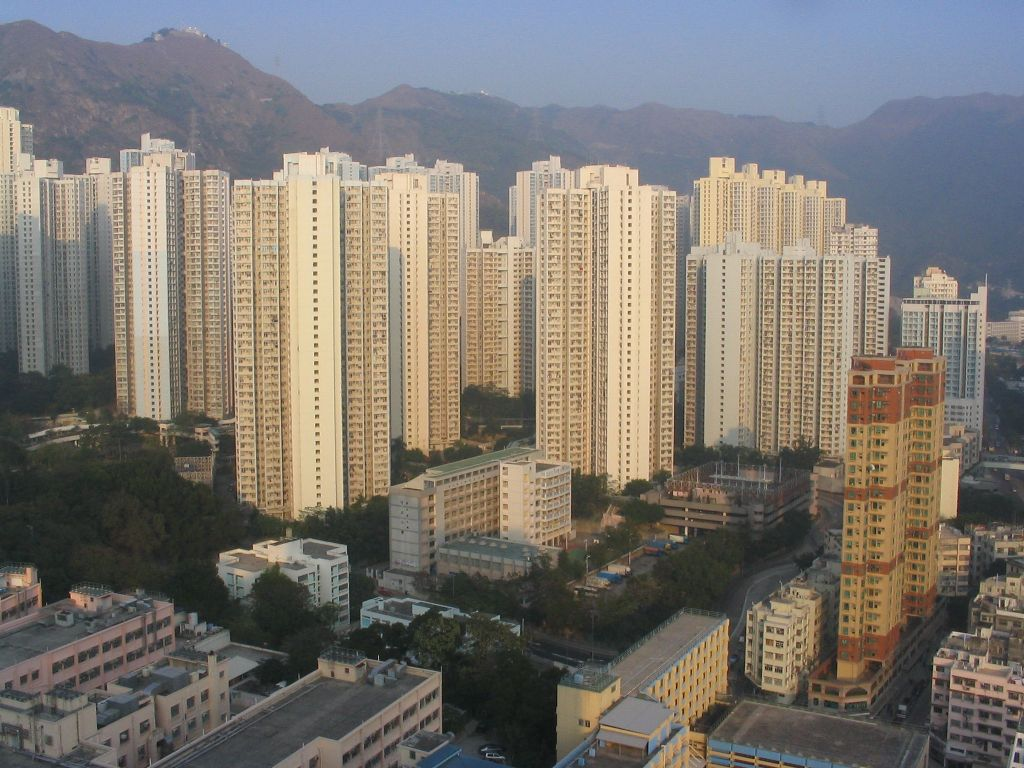
View of Tsz Wan Shan

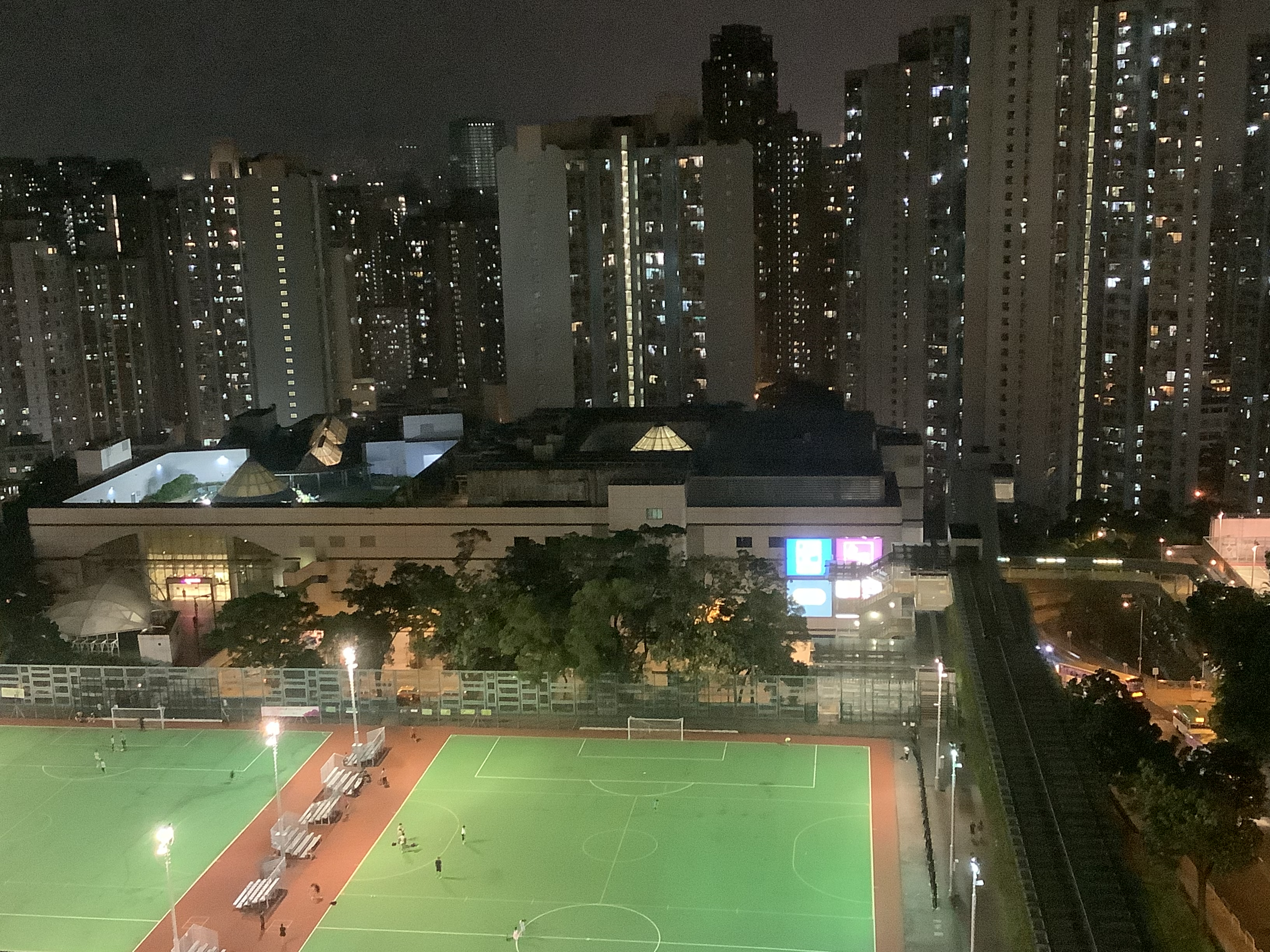
Night of Tsz Wan Shan Estate Central Playground

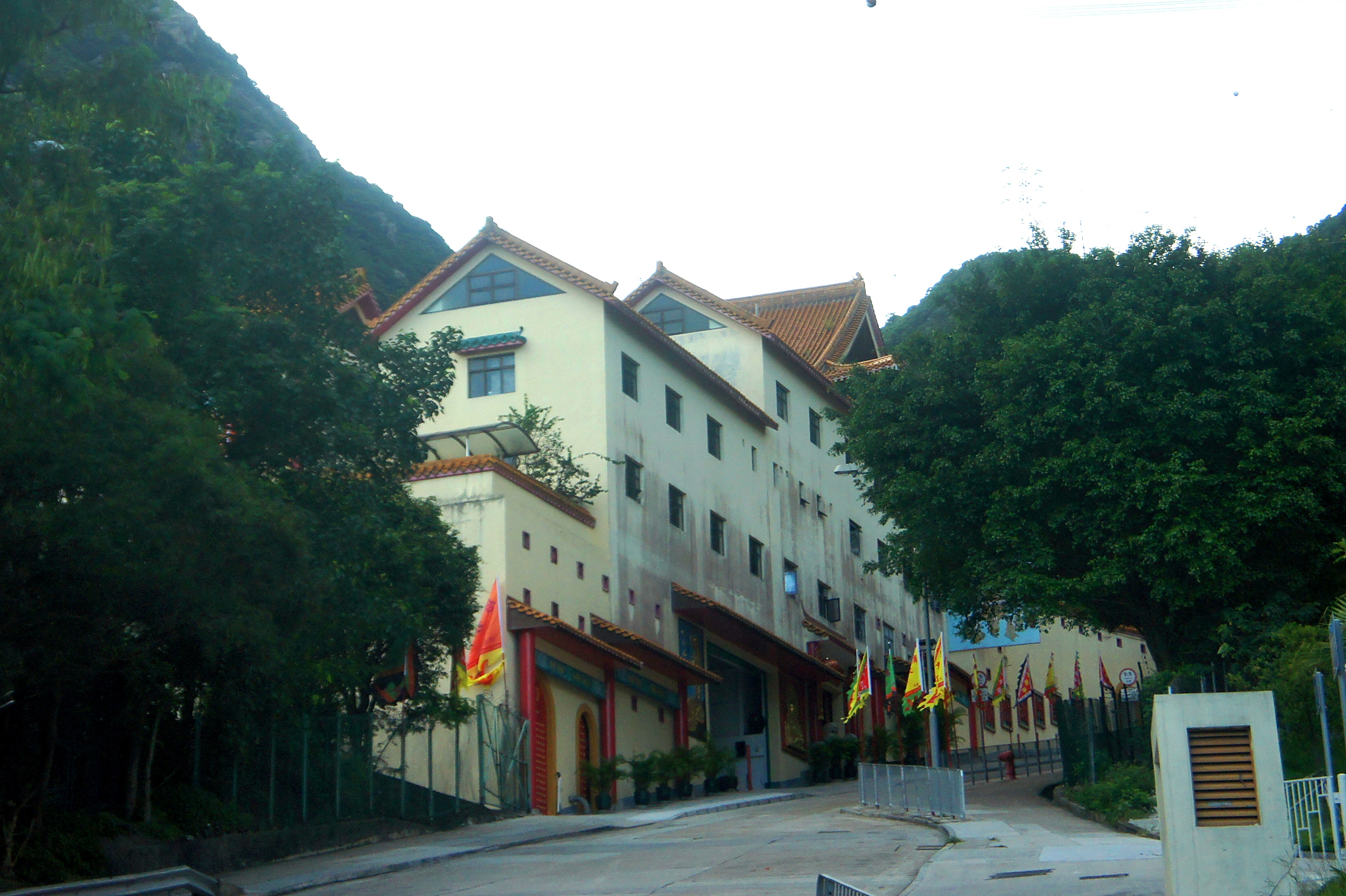
Fat Jong Temple along Sha Tin Pass Road, in Tsz Wan Shan

Tsz Wan Shan (Chinese: 慈雲山; Jyutping: ci4 wan4 saan1) is a residential area in Kowloon, Hong Kong. Located below Temple Hill, it is administratively part of Wong Tai Sin District. Temple Hill is also called Tsz Wan Shan 慈雲山, but Tsz Wan Shan usually refers to the area.

It is a densely populated residential area, consisting of several large public housing estates. The old Tsz Wan Shan housing blocks (64 buildings in total) were demolished between late 1980s and mid 1990s.

== Features ==
Po Kong Village Road Park is located at 140 Po Kong Village Road. There are elevated cycling track (about 1 kilometre in length), cycling area and skater park. Three vertical rams of different difficulty levels are constructed for co-use by players of extreme sports, namely freestyle BMX, skateboarding and aggressive inline skating.

In the very north of the district, a steep path leads to a Kwun Yam temple. The path goes to Temple Hill, part of the Ma On Shan Country Park and then joins the MacLehose Trail and the Wilson Trail, reaching across the New Territories.

== Education ==
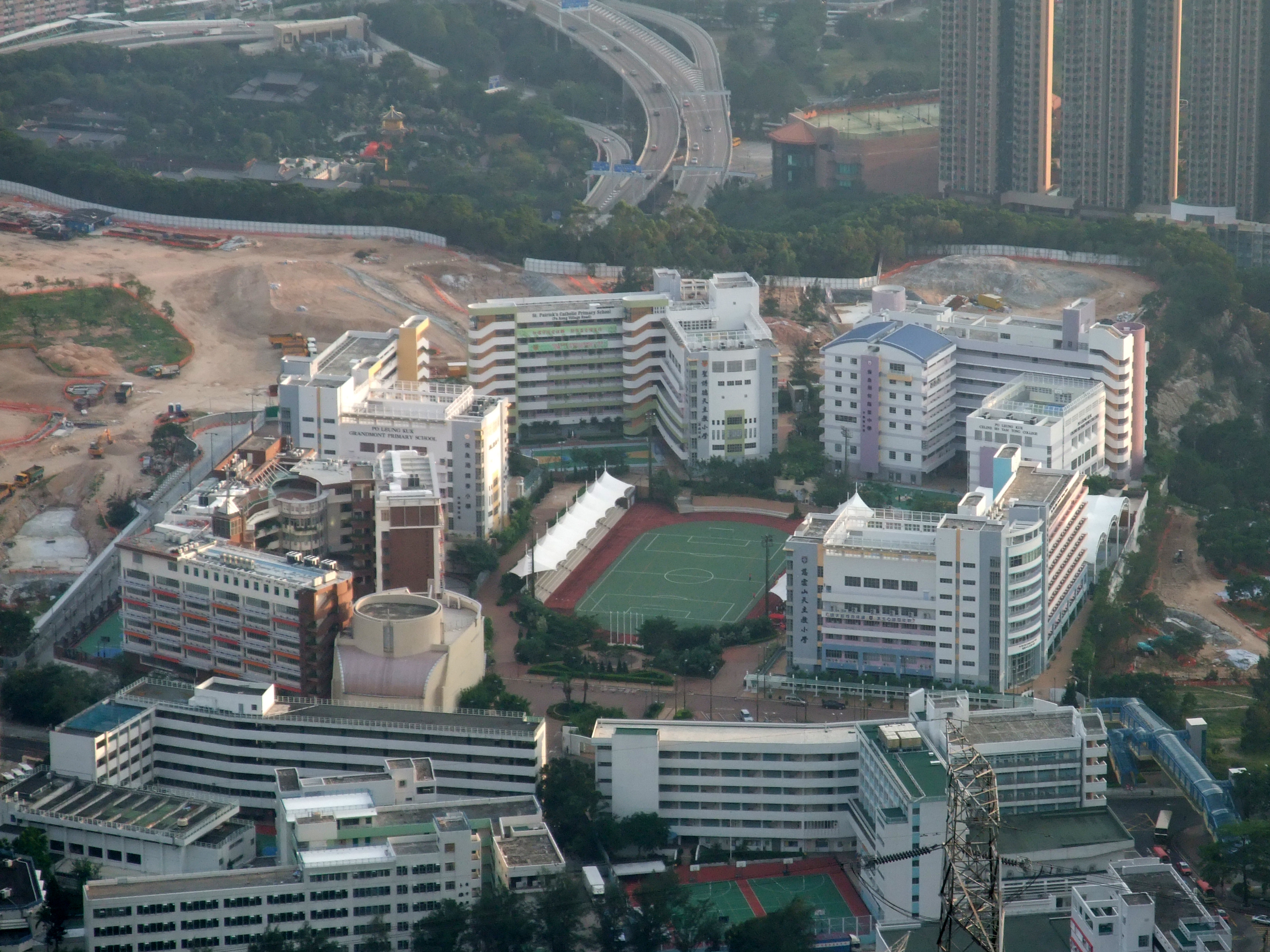
Po Kong Village Road School Village

The first school village in Hong Kong was established in 2002 at Po Kong Village Road, Tsz Wan Shan. It is the only school village in Hong Kong. There are five schools including International Christian Quality Music Secondary and Primary School, Tsz Wan Shan Catholic Primary School, Po Leung Kuk Grandmont Primary School, St. Patrick's Catholic Primary School (Po Kong Village Road) and Po Leung Kuk Celine Ho Yam Tong College.

Tsz Wan Shan is in Primary One Admission (POA) School Net 45. Within the school net are multiple aided schools (operated independently but funded with government money); no government primary schools are in this net.

Hong Kong Public Libraries maintains the Tsz Wan Shan Public Library in the Tsz Wan Shan Shopping Centre.

== Transport ==
Buses: No. 2F, 3B, 3C, 3D, 5C, 15A, 116. Specific time services for 3X, 5P, 302, 302A, A23, E23 & E23A.

Minibuses (Scheduled Services / Green Minibus): No. 18M, 19, 19M, 19S, 20, 37A, 37M, 66S (Night services only), 73.

Minibuses (Red Public Light Buses): From Mong Kok, Tsuen Wan, and Jordan Road. Specific time services from Wan Chai, Causeway Bay, North Point, and Castle Peak Road, Kowloon.

Due to the height and the steep inclination of the mountain, there are no railway connections at Tsz Wan Shan. In February 2008, during a site inspection for the Sha Tin to Central Link, the then Secretary for Transport and Housing, Eva Cheng, said the hilly terrain and geological conditions in Tsz Wan Shan made it technically difficult and risky to build a station in this location, despite strong requests from Wong Tai Sin District Council and many local residents.

== See also ==
- Public housing estates in Tsz Wan Shan
- List of places in Hong Kong
- Transport in Hong Kong
