= Mau Tat =

Coordinates: 22.359428°N 114.203695°E

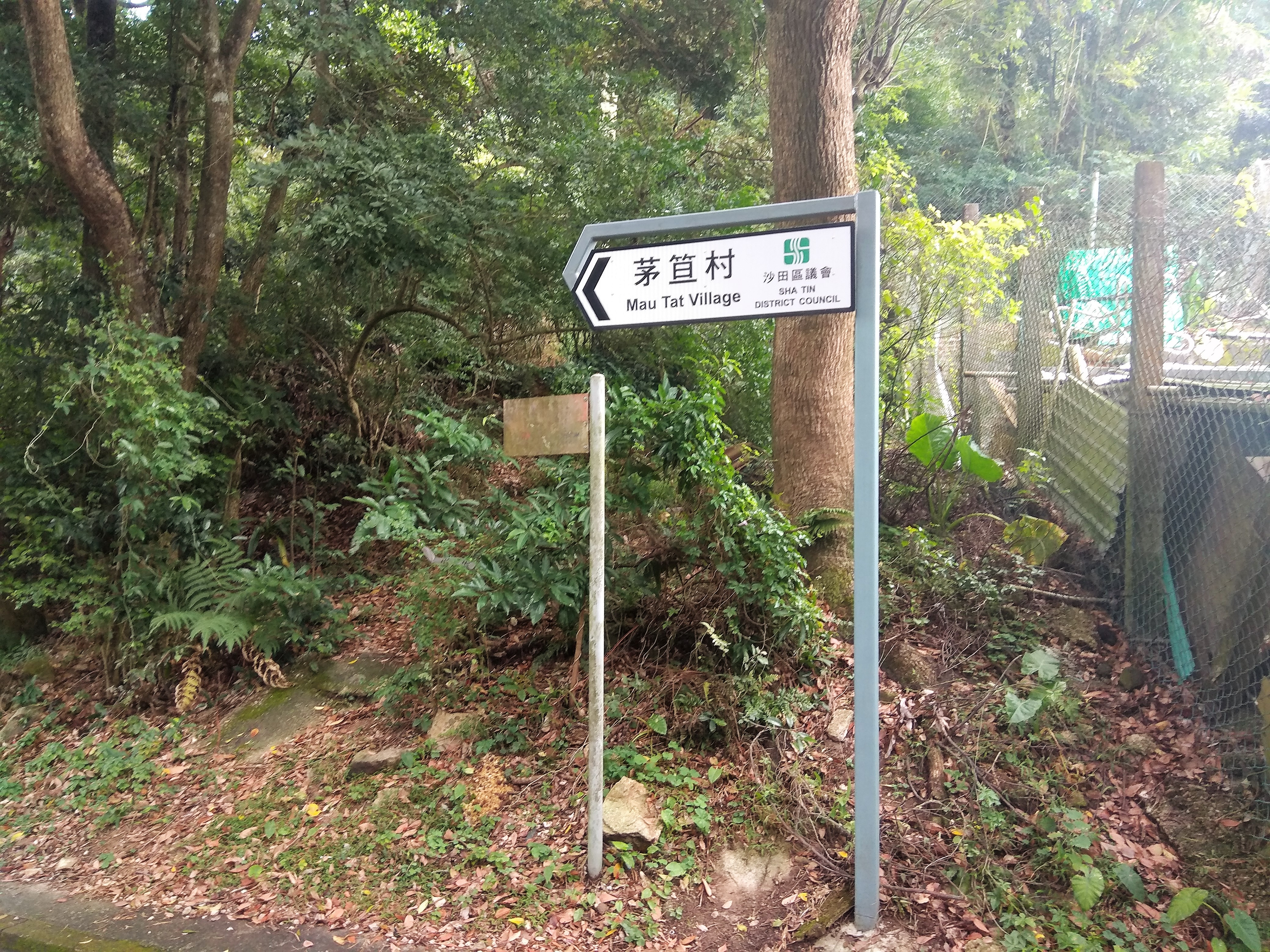
Sign to Mau Tat Village at Sha Tin Pass.

Mau Tat (Chinese: 茅笪) is a village in Sha Tin District, Hong Kong.

== Administration ==
Mau Tat is a recognized village under the New Territories Small House Policy.

== See also ==
- Kau Yeuk (Sha Tin)
- Sha Tin Pass
