= List of schools in Yau Tsim Mong District =

This is a list of schools in Yau Tsim Mong District, Hong Kong.

== Secondary schools ==
Government

- Queen Elizabeth School
- Sir Ellis Kadoorie Secondary School (West Kowloon)

Aided

- CCC Ming Kei College (中華基督教會銘基書院)
- ELCHK Lutheran Secondary School (基督教香港信義會信義中學)
- Hong Kong & Kowloon Chiu Chow Public Association Secondary School (港九潮州公會中學)
- Lai Chack Middle School (麗澤中學)
- LKWFSL Lau Wong Fat Secondary School (世界龍岡學校劉皇發中學)
- Methodist College (循道中學)
- Newman Catholic College (天主教新民書院)
- PLK Vicwood KT Chong Sixth Form College (保良局莊啓程預科書院)
- St Francis Xavier's College (聖芳濟書院)
- St Mary's Canossian College (嘉諾撒聖瑪利書院)
- True Light Girls' College (真光女書院)
- Wah Yan College, Kowloon (華仁書院（九龍）)

Direct Subsidy Scheme

- Diocesan Girls' School (拔萃女書院)
- HKMA David Li Kwok Po College (香港管理專業協會李國寶中學)
- Kowloon Sam Yuk Secondary School (九龍三育中學)

Caput

- SKH All Saints' Middle School (聖公會諸聖中學)

Private

- Mount Kelly School Hong Kong (香港凱莉山學校)
- Rudolf Steiner Education Foundation Hong Kong Maria College (香港華德福教育基金會瑪利亞書院)
- St. Gloria College (Kowloon) (聖迦利亞書院（九龍）)

== Primary schools ==
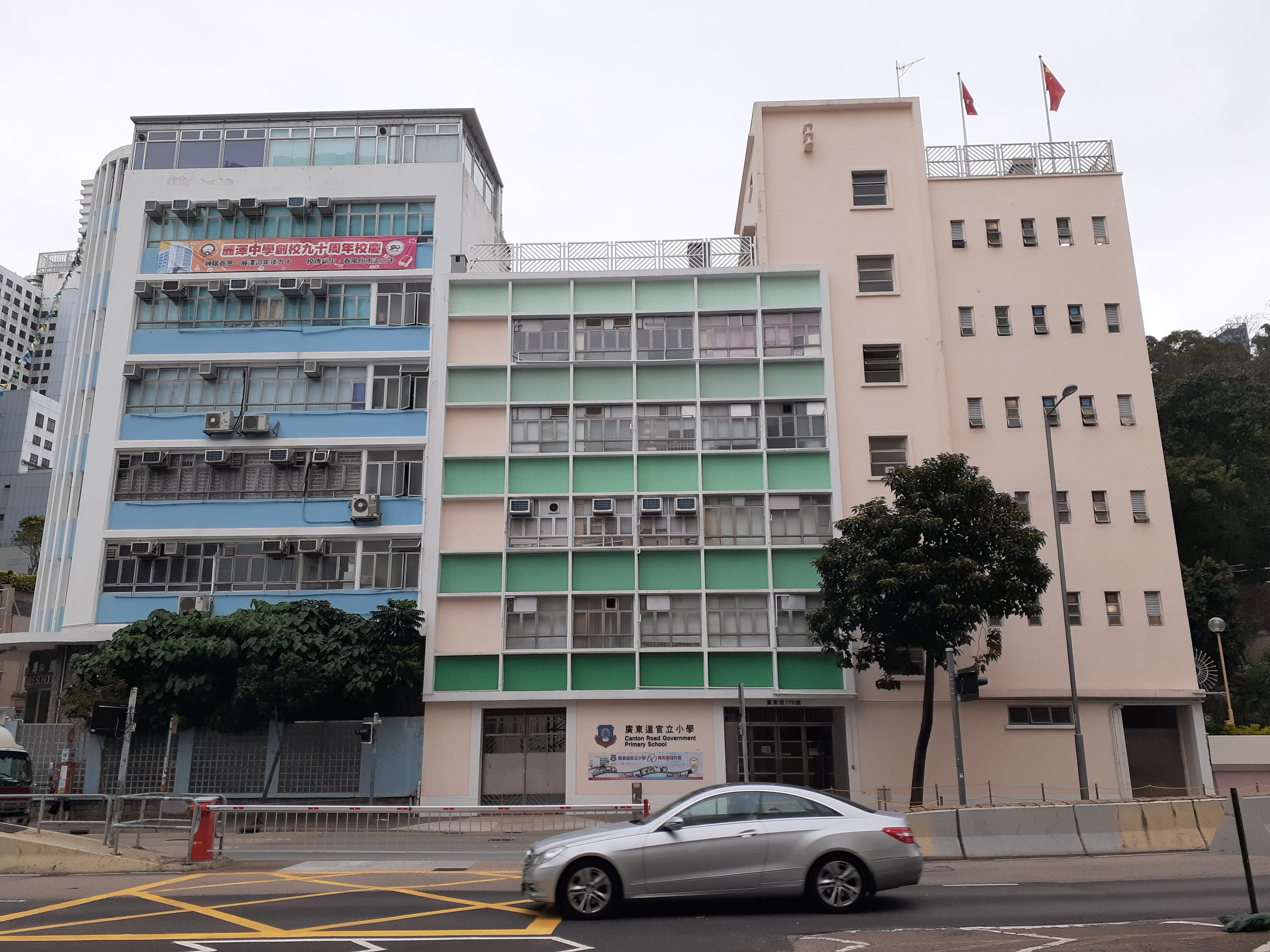
Canton Road Government Primary School

Government

- Canton Road Government Primary School (廣東道官立小學)
- Jordan Road Government Primary School (佐敦道官立小學)
- Tong Mei Road Government Primary School (塘尾道官立小學)

Aided

- CCC Heep Woh Primary School (中華基督教會協和小學)
- CCC Kei Tsun Primary School (中華基督教會基全小學)
- CCC Wanchai Church Kei To Primary School (中華基督教會灣仔堂基道小學)
- Fresh Fish Traders' School (鮮魚行學校)
- Kowloon Women's Welfare Club Li Ping Memorial School (九龍婦女福利會李炳紀念學校)
- Methodist School (循道學校)
- Sharon Lutheran School (路德會沙崙學校)
- SKH Kei Wing Primary School (聖公會基榮小學)
- St Mary's Canossian School (嘉諾撒聖瑪利學校)
- Tai Kok Tsui Catholic Primary School (大角嘴天主教小學)
- Tak Sun School (德信學校)
- TKT Catholic Primary School (Hoi Fan Road) (大角嘴天主教小學（海帆道）)
- Tung Koon District Society Fong Shu Chuen School (東莞同鄉會方樹泉學校)
- TWGH Lo Yu Chik Primary School (東華三院羅裕積小學)
- Yaumati Catholic Primary School (Hoi Wang Road) (油蔴地天主教小學（海泓道）)
- Yaumati Catholic Primary School (油蔴地天主教小學)
- Yaumati Kaifong Association School (油蔴地街坊會學校)

Direct Subsidy Scheme

- G. T. (Ellen Yeung) College (優才（楊殷有娣）書院)
- PLK Camoes Tan Siu Lin Primary School (保良局陳守仁小學)

Private

- Dalton School Hong Kong (香港道爾頓學校)
- Diocesan Girls' Junior School (拔萃女小學)
- Mount Kelly School Hong Kong (香港凱莉山學校)
- VNSAA St. Hilary's School (漢師德萃學校)

== Special schools ==
Aided

- Hong Kong Red Cross Hospital Schools Kwong Wah Hospital (香港紅十字會醫院學校)
- Hong Kong Red Cross Hospital Schools Queen Elizabeth Hospital (香港紅十字會醫院學校)
- TWGHS Chi-li Pao School (東華三院包玉星學校)
