= Temple Hill (Hong Kong) =

Hill between New Kowloon and the New Territories, Hong Kong

- 慈雲山
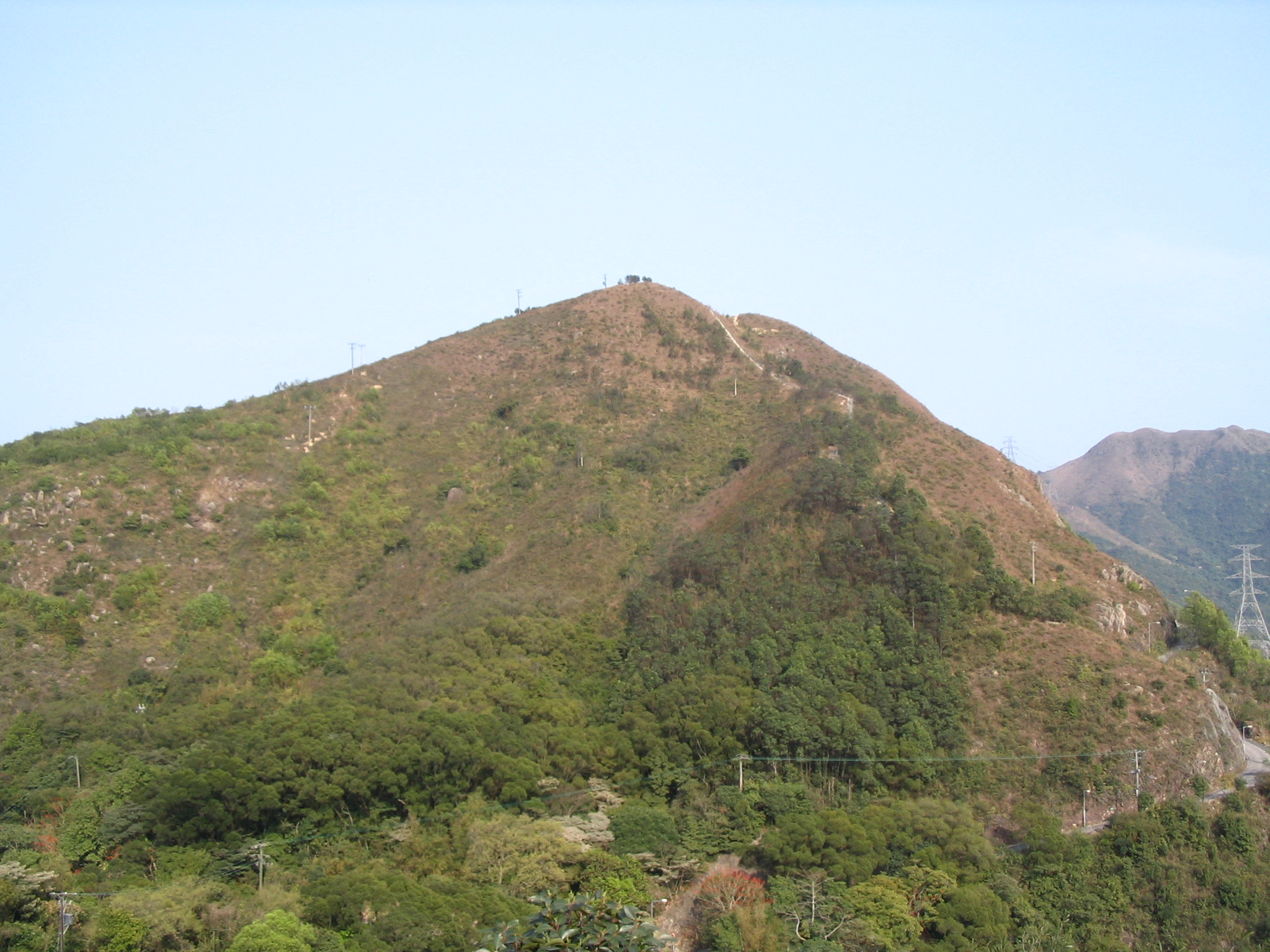
- View of Temple Hill

Highest point
- Elevation: 488 m (1,601 ft)
- Coordinates: 22.356094°N 114.206572°E

Geography
- Location within Hong Kong
- Location: Hong Kong

Temple Hill, also known as Tsz Wan Shan (Chinese: 慈雲山), is a hill between New Kowloon and the New Territories, Hong Kong. It peaks at 488 m. Beneath its south side is the residential area of Tsz Wan Shan and Buddhist temples. Sha Tin Pass runs between the hill and Unicorn Ridge. The summit of the hill is located within Sha Tin District.

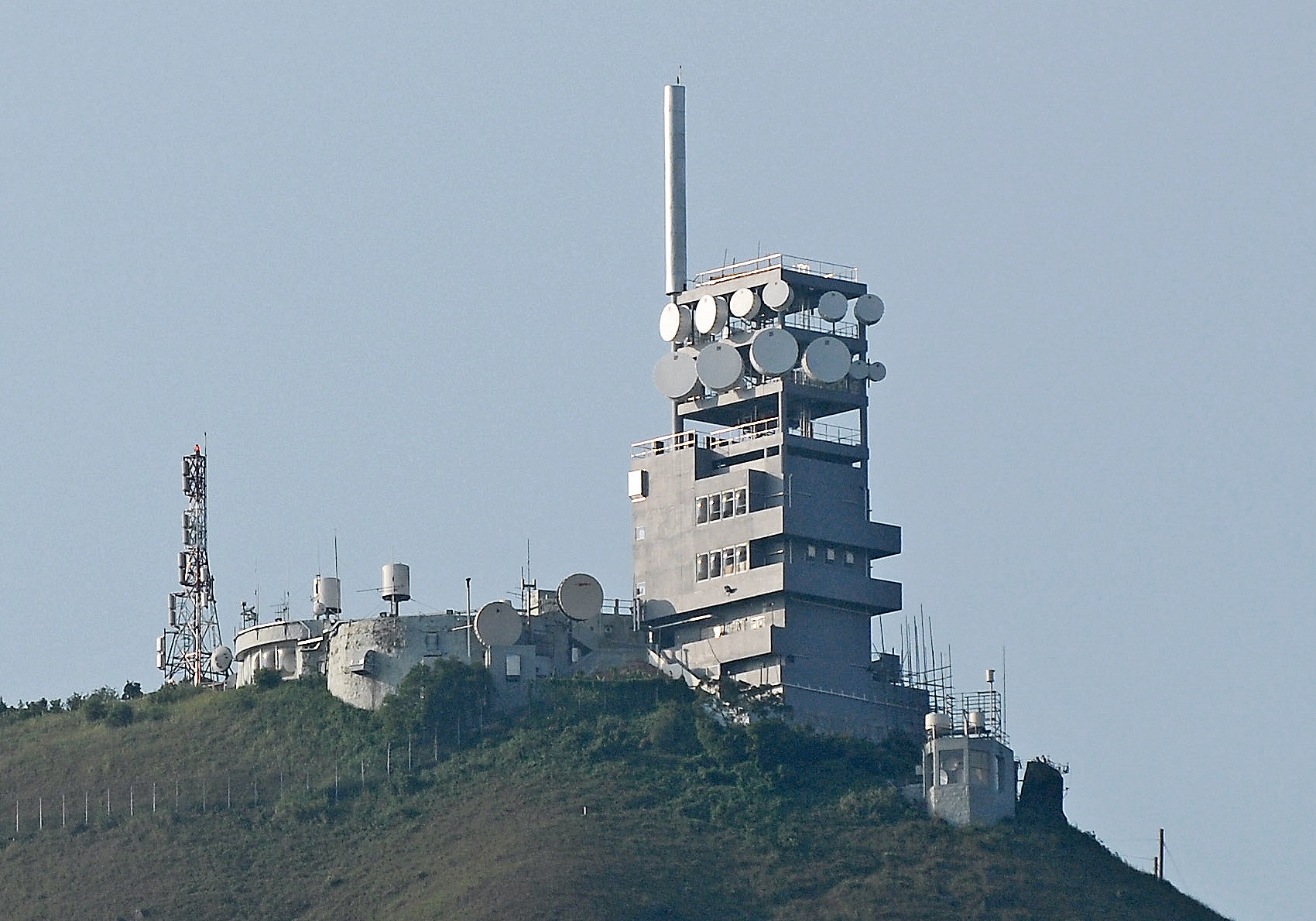
Digital TV transmission tower at Temple Hill

== See also ==
- List of mountains, peaks and hills in Hong Kong
- Eight Mountains of Kowloon
