= Hammer Hill =

Hammer Hill may refer to:

- Hammer Hill (Canada), a hill in Alberta
- Hammer Hill (Hong Kong), a hill in New Kowloon
