= Hammer Hill (Canada) =

Coordinates: 50.95012°N 113.13521°W

Hammer Hill is a summit in Alberta, Canada.

Hammer Hill was named, originally in the Blackfoot language, from an incident when a Cree Indian man was killed with a hammer during a domestic dispute.
