= Kwok Tak-seng Family =

Family from Hong Kong

The Kwok Tak-seng Family refers to a wealthy family based in Hong Kong, primarily known for being the controlling family of Sun Hung Kai Properties (SHKP), a company founded by Kwok Tak-seng. They have long been the richest family in Hong Kong and among the richest in Asia.

== Notable family members ==
- Kwok Tak-seng (1911–1990); founder of SHKP and Kwong Siu-hing (1929– ); wife of Kwok Tak-seng; owns controlling stake of SHKP; former chairman of SHKP
  - Walter Kwok (1950–2018); former chairman and chief executive of SHKP; founder of Empire Group
    - Geoffrey Kwok (b. 1984/85); non-executive director of SHKP; director of Empire Group
    - Jonathan Kwok (b. 1992); director of Empire Group
  - Thomas Kwok (b. 1951); former joint chairman and chief executive of SHKP
    - Adam Kwok (b. 1983); executive director of SHKP
  - Raymond Kwok (b. 1952); chairman and chief executive of SHKP
    - Edward Kwok (b. 1981); alternate director of SHKP
    - Christopher Kwok (b. 1986); executive director of SHKP

== Enterprises ==
=== Current ===
- Sun Hung Kai Properties

=== Former ===
- Sun Hung Kai Bank
- Sun Hung Kai & Co.
- Sun Hung Kai Financial
