= Wilson Security =

Australian private security company

Wilson Security Pty Ltd
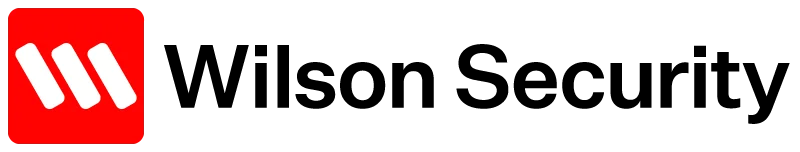
- Type: Private (subsidiary)
- Industry: Security services
- Founded: 2000; Melbourne, Victoria, Australia
- Area served: Australia, New Zealand
- Key people: Nick Frangoulis (CEO)
- Services: Static guarding, mobile patrols, electronic security, corporate risk advisory
- Parent: Wilson Group (Sun Hung Kai Properties)
- Website: wilsonsecurity.com.au

Wilson Security is an Australian private security company. It was started in 2000 in Melbourne. In 2014 it acquired the security contracts of ISS A/S Security in Australia and First Security Business in New Zealand. Wilson Security is a part of the Wilson Group which is owned by Sun Hung Kai Properties, the corporation of the Hong Kong–based Kwok family, one of the richest families in Asia, currently run by Raymond Kwok (previously also run by Thomas Kwok until he resigned after being found guilty of corruption).

In 2015 it was a subcontractor of Broadspectrum at Australian offshore detention facilities (the others being managed by Serco at the time). At the time, Wilson had been working on Nauru since late 2012, and on Manus Island since February 2014. In 2015, Wilson Security and Broadspectrum/Transfield were accused of providing misleading information to the Australian Parliament, and covering up malpractice at the Nauru Centre and the extent of a spying operation against Senator Sarah Hanson-Young.

== History ==
Wilson Security was founded in Melbourne in 2000. Over the following decade the company acquired several smaller regional firms, including MSA Security in Western Australia, City Eastern in New South Wales, the ADESC patrols business, and Global Security Management Pty Ltd in the Pilbara region.

By the mid-2000s the company had won contracts with Arts SA (2006), Transfield Services for the Department of Defence (2007) and ANZ (2008). It also began offering medical and emergency response services in Far North Queensland and the Pilbara.

In 2014, Wilson Security was the exclusive security provider for the G20 Summit in Brisbane and won a Defence contract covering Victoria, Tasmania, Western Australia, the Northern Territory and southern New South Wales. That same year the company acquired the commercial security operations of ISS A/S in Australia and First Security in New Zealand, entering the New Zealand market for the first time. Tasmanian operations also began in 2014.

In 2015 and 2016 the company introduced its RAPID mobile patrol service, which used GPS-based attendance verification. It also acquired four smaller operators during this period: JASP in Alice Springs, Lex Security in South Australia, Verifect on the Sunshine Coast and Advance in Victoria.

Wilson Security established a Reconciliation Action Plan in 2017. The company provided security for the 2018 Gold Coast Commonwealth Games and acquired Tronsec, a technology integration business, expanding into electronic security installation and maintenance. New offices opened in Katherine and Townsville, and a corporate risk advisory division was added. In 2023 the Department of Defence awarded Wilson Security its Base Services Contractor of the Year Award.

== Services and operations ==
Wilson Security's main business is static guarding, with security officers posted at commercial buildings, retail centres, government facilities and defence sites. The company's RAPID mobile patrol division uses GPS tracking and attendance verification to record whether patrols have been completed.

Through its Tronsec subsidiary the company designs, installs and maintains access control, CCTV and alarm systems. A separate corporate risk division offers security assessments, investigations and risk management consulting.

Wilson Security is licensed to operate in all Australian states and territories and has operations in New Zealand.

== Corporate structure ==
Wilson Security is wholly owned by the Wilson Group, which is in turn wholly owned by Sun Hung Kai Properties Limited, a Hong Kong-listed property and infrastructure conglomerate controlled by the Kwok family. Sun Hung Kai Properties acquired the Wilson Group in 1991. Other Wilson Group businesses include Wilson Parking, which operates car parks in Australia, New Zealand, Hong Kong and several other countries.

Nick Frangoulis has led the company as Chief Executive Officer since his appointment to the role, having joined Wilson Security in 2011 as Group Chief Operating Officer.

== Leadership ==
As of 2024, Wilson Security's leadership team includes:

- Nick Frangoulis, Chief Executive Officer
- Rick Westerhoff, Chief Financial Officer
- Nick Schijf, Chief Operating Officer
- Carly Povey, Chief Customer Officer
- Paul Brazier, General Manager, Risk and Compliance

== See also ==
- Wilson Parking
- Sun Hung Kai Properties
