= SHKP =

SHKP may refer to:

- National Employment Service (Albania), an Albanian government agency
- Sun Hung Kai Properties, a property developer company in Hong Kong
