= Geoffrey Kwok =

Asian billionaire

- Born: 1984 or 1985 (age 40–41)
- Education: Yale University; Stanford University
- Occupation: Businessman
- Parent: Walter Kwok
- Relatives: Kwok Tak-seng (grandfather)

Geoffrey Kwok (born 1984/1985) is a Hong Kong billionaire, and a director of Empire Group. He is the eldest son of Walter Kwok, who founded the Empire Group. His grandfather Kwok Tak-seng founded Sun Hung Kai Properties, which Walter Kwok and his brothers inherited, Asia's largest real estate developers.

== Education ==
Kwok attended Yale University where he obtained a bachelor's degree in economics, and an MBA from Stanford University.

== Career ==
Before his father's death, Kwok worked with Morgan Stanley as an investment banker. In October 2018, Walter Kwok died from a heart attack. Kwok inherited his stakes in Sun Hung Kai along with his brother Jonathan. In October 2018, shortly after his father's death, Kwok became a director of Empire Group, Hong Kong, along with his siblings Jonathan and Lesley.

In December 2018, he became a board member and a non-executive director at Sun Hung Kai properties. Kwok also manages the hotel division of Sun Hung Kai.

== Wealth ==
With a net worth of $40.4 billion, the Kwok family is Asia's third richest family according to Forbes. In May 2020, Forbes estimated Kwok to be worth $2.5 billion.
