= Wilson Parking =

Hong Kong-based car parking management company

Wilson Parking (Holdings) Limited
- Native name: 威信停車場
- Type: Private subsidiary of Wilson Group
- Industry: Transport
- Founded: 1983; 43 years ago British Hong Kong
- Headquarters: Hong Kong
- Services: Parking service, car beautification service, storage service
- Parent: Wilson Group; Sun Hung Kai Properties
- Website: www.wilsonparking.com.hk

Wilson Parking
- Traditional Chinese: 威信停車場
- Simplified Chinese: 威信停车场
Transcriptions
Standard Mandarin
- Hanyu Pinyin: Wēixìn Tíngchēchǎng
Yue: Cantonese
- Jyutping: wai1 seon3 ting4 ce1 coeng4

Wilson Parking (Chinese: 威信停車場) is a Hong Kong-based car parking management company. It is a subsidiary of the wider Wilson Group, which operates across six countries in the Asia-Pacific region. It first opened for business in Hong Kong in 1983, 21 years after Wilson Group first began operations in Perth, Western Australia in 1962. In Hong Kong, Wilson Parking manages some 265 car parks with 55,000 bays. Wilson Parking in Hong Kong and mainland China are wholly owned subsidiaries of Sun Hung Kai Properties. Wilson Parking in Australia is a wholly owned subsidiary of Wilson Group which is itself a wholly owned subsidiary of Sun Hung Kai Properties. Sun Hung Kai Properties is run by the Kwok family, one of the richest families in Asia. Its previous managing director Thomas Kwok was convicted of corruption charges in 2014 and stepped down from leading the company at that time.

Its head office is in the World Trade Centre Hong Kong (世界貿易中心) in Causeway Bay.

== Company overview ==
Wilson Parking (Holdings) Limited (Chinese: 威信停車場管理(控股)有限公司) is a wholly owned subsidiary of Wilson Group. It was established in Hong Kong in 1983. Wilson Parking was founded by Laurence "Laurie" Wilson, who was forced to sell the business in the early 1990s due to a stockmarket crash. Laurence Wilson was later convicted of stealing $200,000 from an investment company, for which he was sentenced to a fine of $40,000. Wilson Group was acquired by Sun Hung Kai Properties in 1991. Parking schemes include Hourly, Day Park, Night Park, 12-hour Park, 24-hour Park, Max Park, Quarterly and also Reserved and Non-reserved monthly parking.

== Portfolio ==
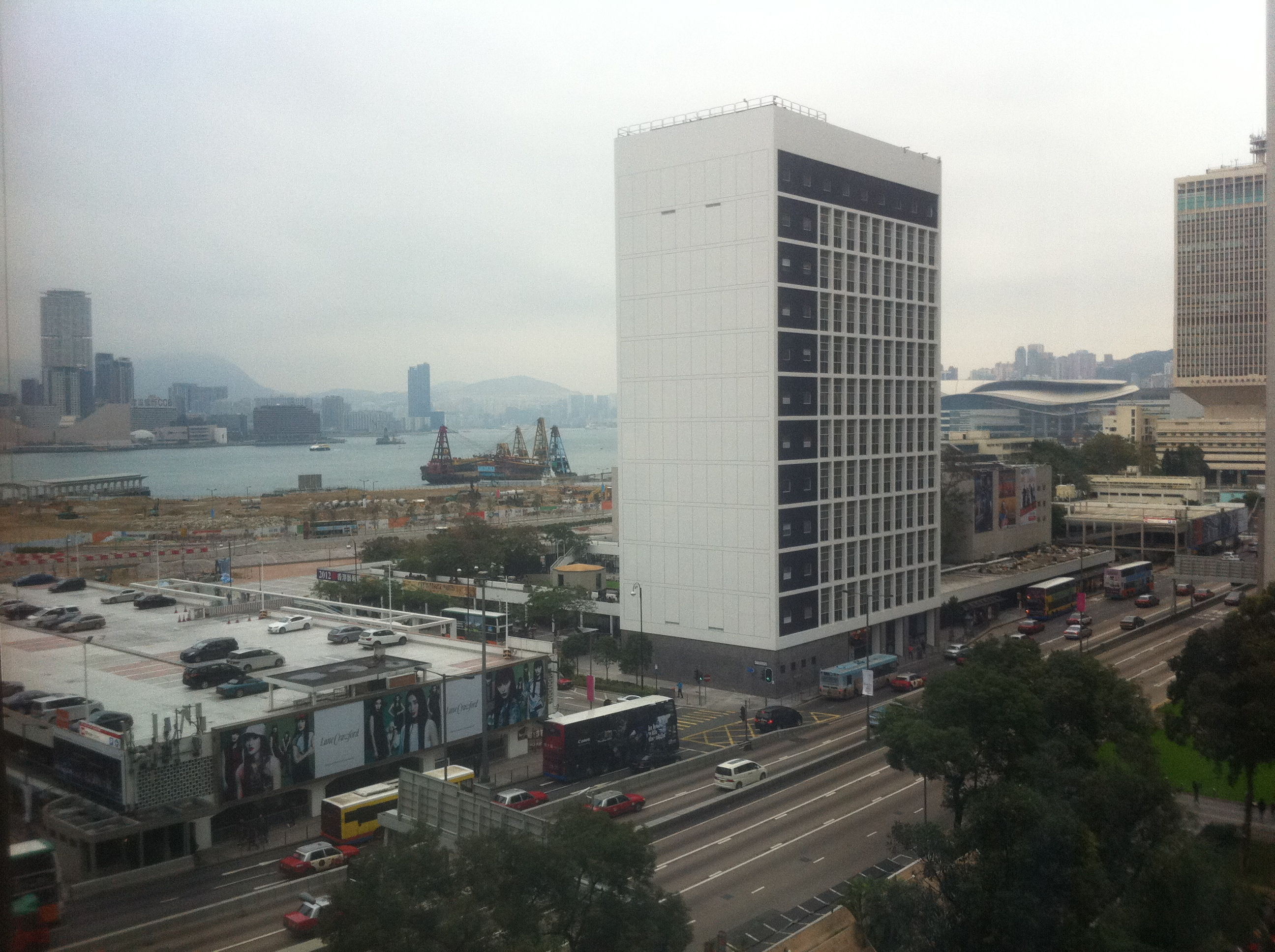
Parking services for Government and Quasi-Government area

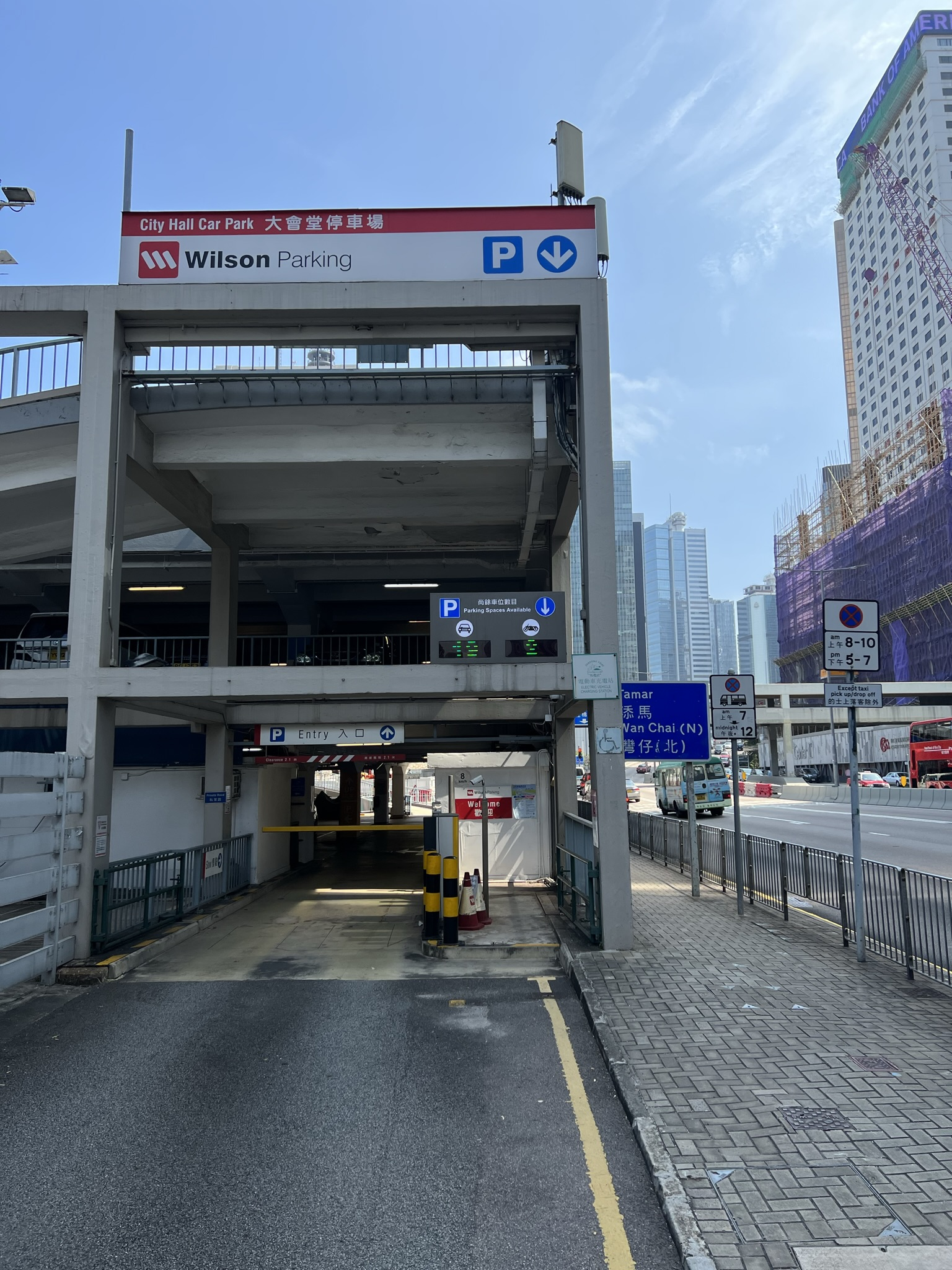
City Hall Car Park Entrance

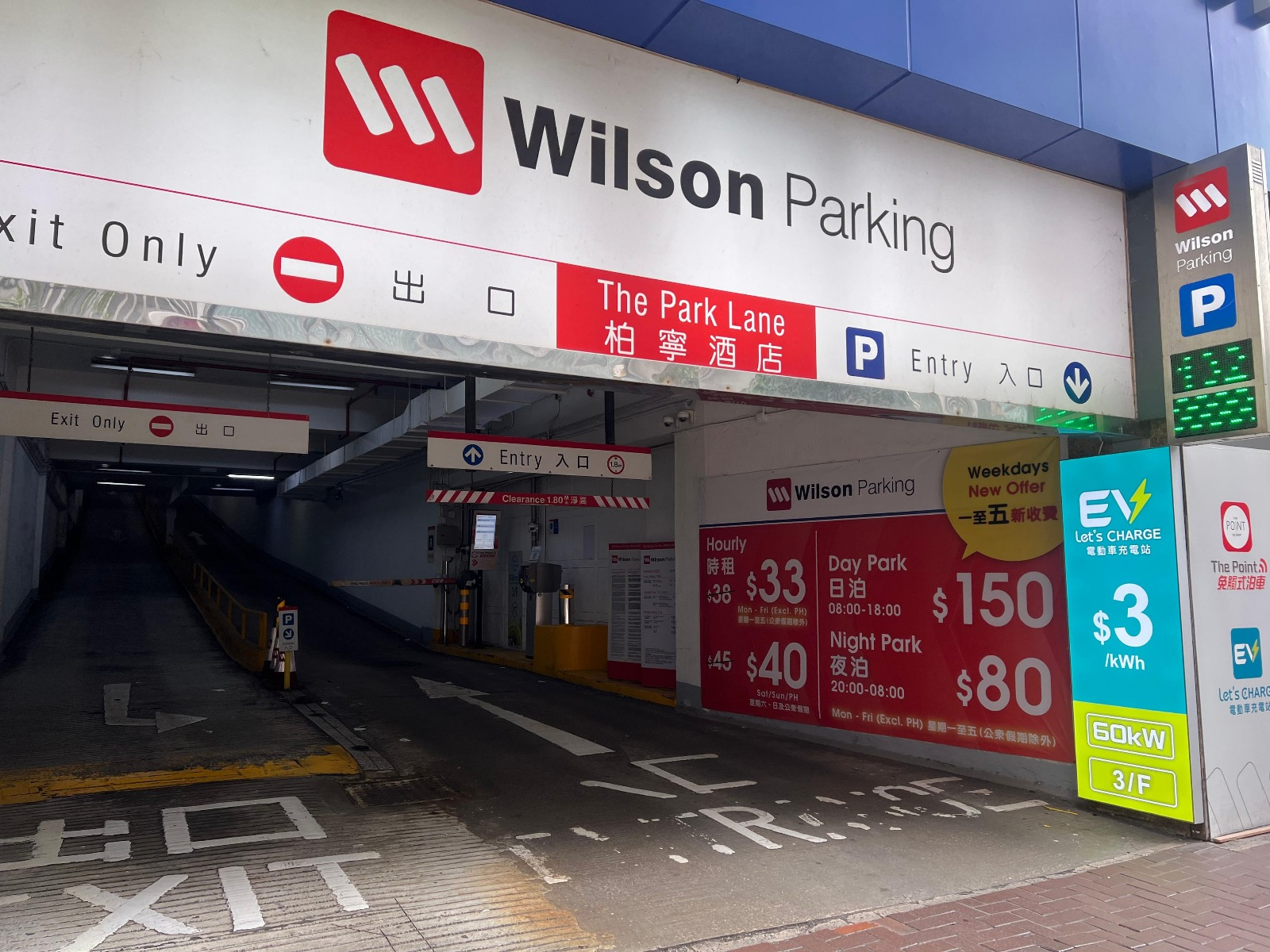
Park Lane Hotel Car Park 2025

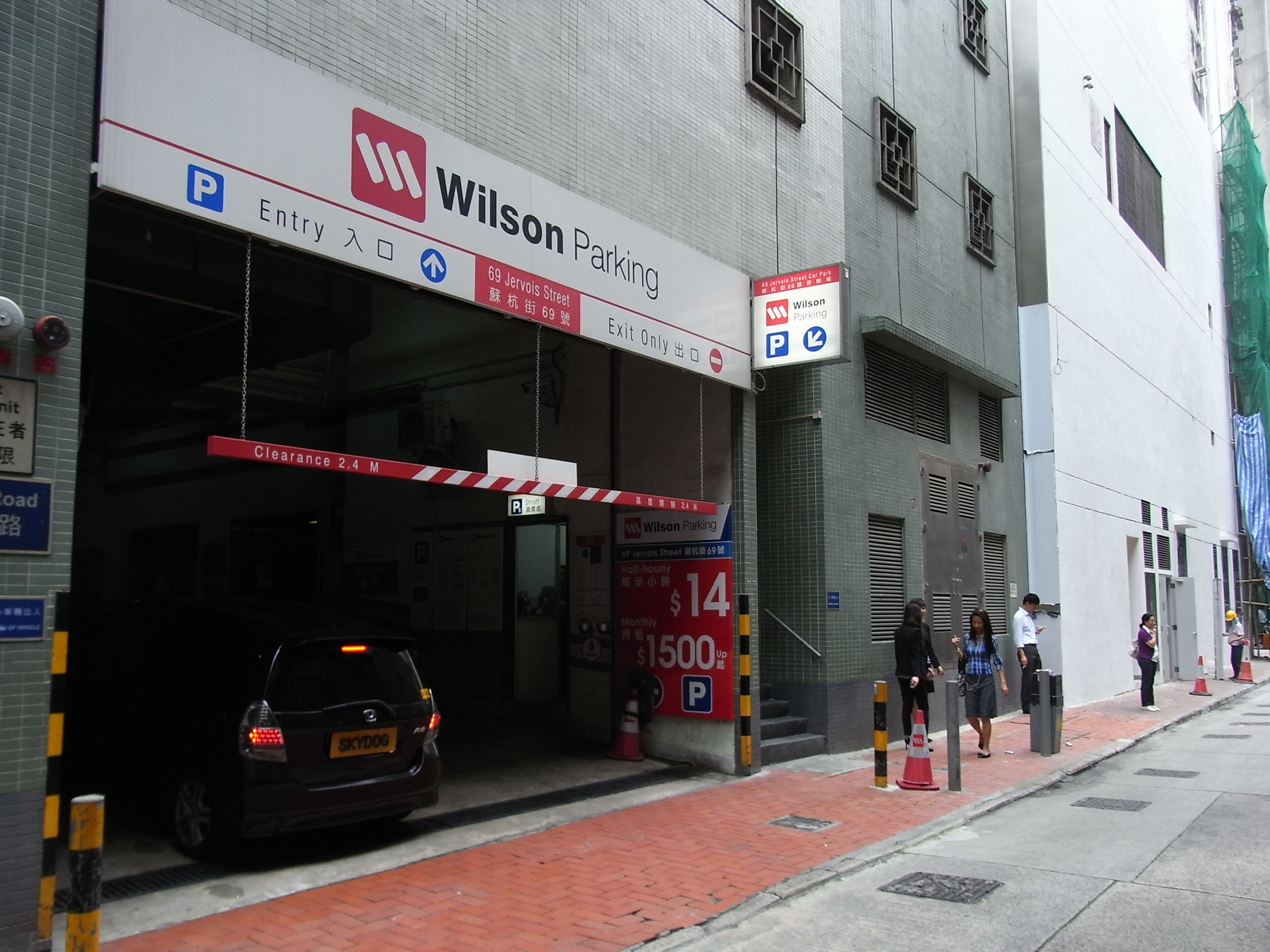
Parking service for Commercial office tower

The company covers full parking services in Hong Kong:

- Government
- Quasi-government
- Housing estates
- Hospitals
- Upscale residential developments
- Airport
- Shopping malls
- Commercial office towers
- Industrial buildings
- Colleges and universities
- Hotels
- Markets

== EV Charging Service ==
Wilson Parking is actively expanding its electric vehicle (EV) charging services by establishing "Let's Charge" EV charging stations in various locations across Hong Kong, offering both 60kW and medium charging.

== See also ==
- Wilson Security
