= Larvotto (Hong Kong) =

Private housing estate in Hong Kong

南灣 Larvotto
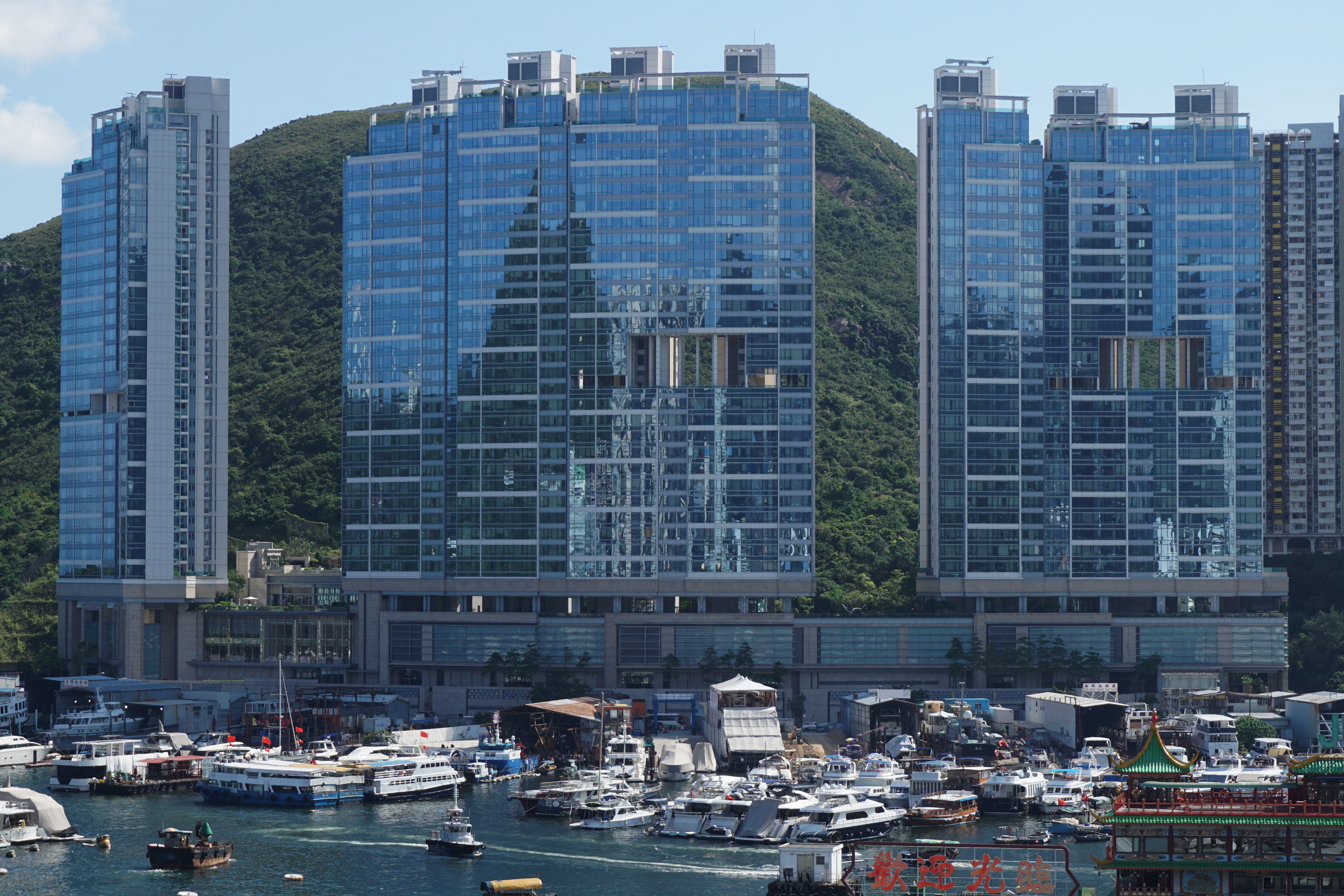
- Larvotto
- Interactive map of 南灣; Larvotto

General information
- Location: 8 Ap Lei Chau Praya Road, Ap Lei Chau, Hong Kong
- Coordinates: 22.240296°N 114.159869°E
- Status: Good

Construction
- Constructed: 2011; 15 years ago

Other information
- Governing body: LaSalle

Larvotto (Chinese: 南灣) is a private housing estate in Hong Kong. It was developed by Sun Hung Kai Properties, Kerry Properties and Paliburg Holdings, built and sold by Sun Hung Kai and managed by Kerry Properties. The site comprises 180,000 square feet, including nine buildings and a total of 715 tenements. It is located in 8 Ap Lei Chau Praya Road, Ap Lei Chau, Hong Kong. The estate is opposite Sham Wan. It got the occupation permit at the end of April 2011.

== Introduction ==
Larvotto is located in East Ap Lei Chau, Southern District, next to the Aberdeen Channel. Close to The Aberdeen Marina Club and Ocean Park. Tower 1 and 2 overlooks Repulse Bay, Stanley, and other scenery. The estate is close to Marinella, Sham Wan Towers, South Horizons, Cyberport and other well-known estates.

Before the project was officially named, it was known as Seaview Leighton Hill, because this is another project cooperated by Sun Hung Kai Properties, Kerry Properties and Paliburg Holdings after Leighton Hill. The English naming ideas of "Larvotto" comes from the famous La Futuo Beach (Larvotto Beach) in western Europe Monte Carlo. The naming ideas of the Chinese name "南灣" comes from the nearby South Bay Beach on Hong Kong Island. South Bay is also one of the richest residential areas in Hong Kong.

Residential flats start at 7/F, every flat has a terrace and high ceilings of about 3.3 to 3.5 m. Some of the special units have a private swimming pool and a roof.

Larvotto has 9 towers (without tower 4), and is divided into three parts.

- Tower 1,2: Each floor 2 flats, 2,363 to 2,545 square feet.
- Tower 3,5,6,7: Each floor 3 flats, 990 to 1,998 square feet.
- Tower 8,9,10: Each floor 4 flats, 591 to 1,338 square feet.

Its 150,000 square feet club house is named Club Voyage. In addition to the basic facilities and ample space for leisure, it also includes private yacht services, training coach services, indoor and outdoor swimming pool, multipurpose playground, karaoke, entertainment rooms, spa rooms, an advanced sea view restaurant, two ballrooms and three gardens. Larvotto also has a pet park for households that have pets. A kindergarten is operated by Braemar Hill Nursery School.

== Standard Flat ==
Area	Locate	View	Room	Number	Proportion
2,363－2,567	T1: B Flat, T2: A/B Flat	Sea	2 Suites, Maid Room, Independent lift lobbies, 4 Washrooms	92	12.9%
1,968－1,998	T3: A/B Flat	Sea	2 Suites, Maid Room, 4 Washrooms	50	7%
1,730－1,745	T7: B Flat	Sea	2 Suites, Maid Room, 4 Washrooms	24	3.4%
1,411－1,486	T5/6: A/B Flat, T7: A Flat	Sea	1 Suite, Maid Room, 3 Washrooms	118	16.5%
1,278－1,338	T6/9/10: A/B Flat	Sea	1 Suite, Maid Room, 3 Washrooms	132	18.5%
1,013	T7: C Flat	Sea	4 Suites, Store Room, 2 Washrooms	24	3.4%
990	T3/5: C Flat	Mountain	4 Suites, Store Room, 2 Washrooms	77	10.8%
771	T8: C/D Flat, T9: C Flat	Mountain	3 Suites, 2 Washrooms	74	10.3%
591－592	T9: D Flat, T10: C/D Flat	Mountain	1 Suite, 1 Washroom	66	9.2%

== Design ==
Being one of the landmarks in that region, Larvotto has a 320-meter sleek yacht-shaped design. Its unique design was awarded the International Real Estate Award, The best building of Hong Kong (Skyscraper) and Highly commended award, which was organized by International Real Estate Organization, Bloomberg and Google.

== Sales and leasing ==
Larvotto was sold by Sun Hung Kai, with 94% units pre-sold in 2010. Larvoto won the 'championship' of Hong Kong real estate selling in 2010 by successfully selling about 674 units, with total price of about 14.47 billion dollars. 300 unit was sold in 8 days, breaking the sales record of the Hong Kong luxury residential. Average price of the transactions is 30 million dollars. The prices of parking spaces range from 1450000 to 1580000, hitting a new high in the same district.

== Neighboring landmarks ==
- Ocean Park
- Jumbo Floating Restaurant
- Aberdeen Boat Club
- The Aberdeen Marina Club
- Ap Lei Chau Wind Tower Park

== Transportation ==
- Shuttle bus HR87 (Larvotto/Central Harbour Building)
- MTR Lei Tung station
- Main roads: Ap Lei Chau Bridge, Aberdeen Praya Road, Wong Chuk Hang Road

== Politics ==
Larvotto is located in Lei Tung I constituency of the Southern District Council. It was formerly represented by Janice Chan Yan-yi, who was elected in the 2019 elections until July 2021.
