= SUNeVision =

Data centre provider in Hong Kong

SUNeVision Holdings Ltd. 新意網集團有限公司
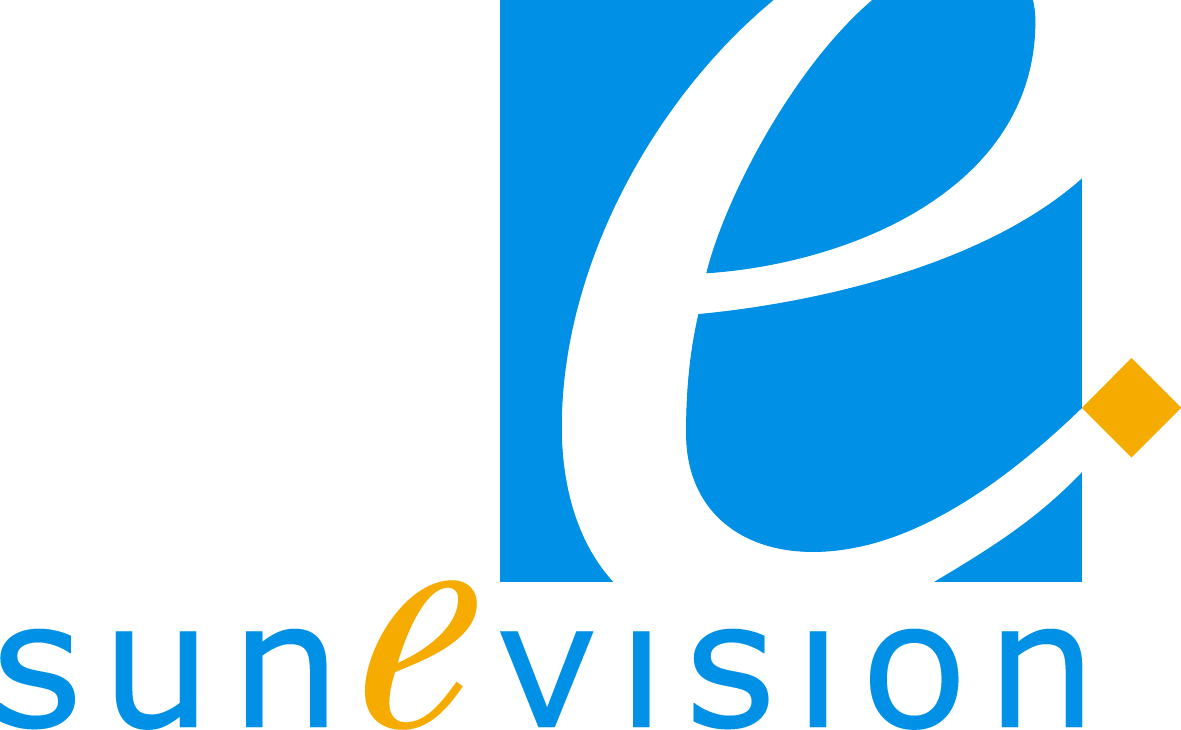
- Company type: Listed company
- Traded as: SEHK: 1686
- Industry: Information technology
- Founded: 2000
- Headquarters: Hong Kong, People's Republic of China
- Key people: Chairman: Mr. Raymond Kwok
- Products: Data centre
- Revenue: HK$1,365M (2017/18 financial year)
- Net income: HK$776M (2017/18 financial year)
- Total assets: HK$7,094M (2017/18 financial year)
- Total equity: HK$3,928M (2017/18 financial year)
- Number of employees: 250+
- Parent: Sun Hung Kai Properties

SUNeVision, the technology arm of Sun Hung Kai Properties, is the largest data centre provider in Hong Kong. The company provides carrier and cloud-neutral data centre services.

== History ==
The company was established and listed on the Hong Kong Stock Exchange via Growth Enterprise Market in 2000 with its IPO price of HK$10.38 per share. The international placing and public offer of the shares subscription were 55 and 217 times oversubscribed respectively. The company transferred its listing to the Main Board in 2018 as the data centre business continued to grow.

On 29 August 2025, the company established "HKChat OmniServe Limited" and developed a large language model specifically designed for Hong Kong. Afterwards, the public beta version of HKChat was released on 20 November 2025.

== Data Centres ==
- MEGA Plus - A purpose-built high-tier greenfield data centre. This flagship data centre with 474,000 square feet gross data centre space is built on a dedicated land lot in Tseung Kwan O for high-tier data centre development.
- MEGA-i - Located on Hong Kong Island, a purpose-built carrier and cloud neutral data centre with over 200 telco carriers, ISPs and other types of service providers. It is one of the largest high-tier Internet Service Centre buildings in the world with 350,000 square feet gross data centre space.
- MEGA Two - Located in Fo Tan, a data centre converted from industrial building with high-tier data centre standard offering 520,000 square feet gross data centre space.
- ONE - A data centre with 20,000 square feet gross data centre space located in Kwun Tong
- JUMBO - A data centre with 120,000 square feet gross data centre space located in Tsuen Wan

In addition to data centre land acquired in Tseung Kwan O and Tsuen Wan, new data centres would be upcoming with Gross Floor Area (GFA) of over 1.2 million square feet.
