= Sun Hung Kai Centre =

Office building in Wan Chai, Hong Kong

- 新鴻基中心
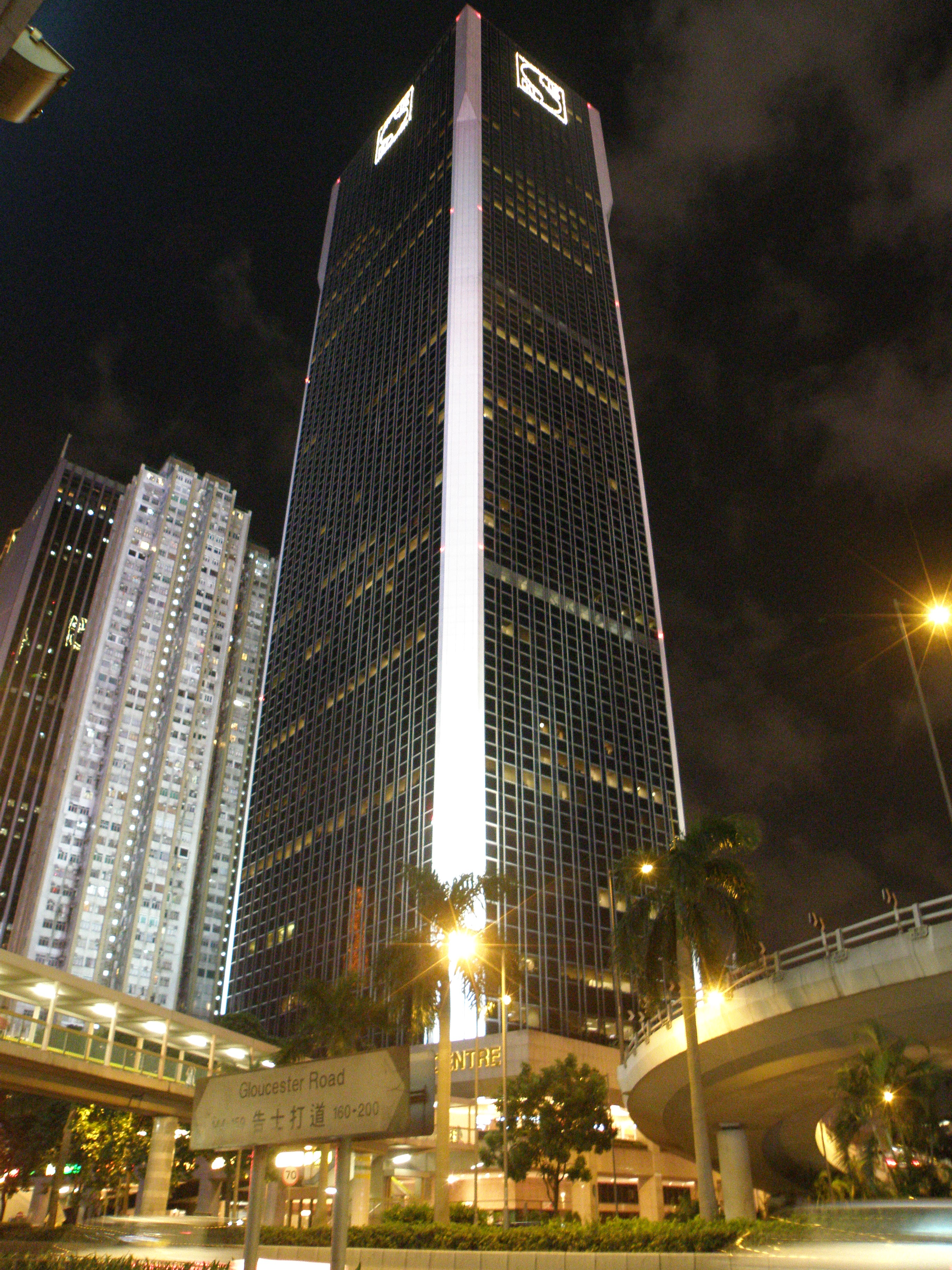
- Interactive map of the Sun Hung Kai Centre area

General information
- Status: Completed
- Type: Office
- Location: 30 Harbour Road, Wan Chai, Hong Kong Island, Hong Kong
- Coordinates: 22.2802237°N 114.1769466°E
- Completed: 1980
- Opening: 1981
- Owner: Sun Hung Kai Properties

Height
- Roof: 214.5 m (704 ft)

Technical details
- Floor count: 56

Sun Hung Kai Centre
- Traditional Chinese: 新鴻基中心
- Simplified Chinese: 新鸿基中心
Transcriptions
Standard Mandarin
- Hanyu Pinyin: Xīnhóngjī Zhōngxīn
Yue: Cantonese
- Jyutping: san1 hung4 gei1 zung1 sam1

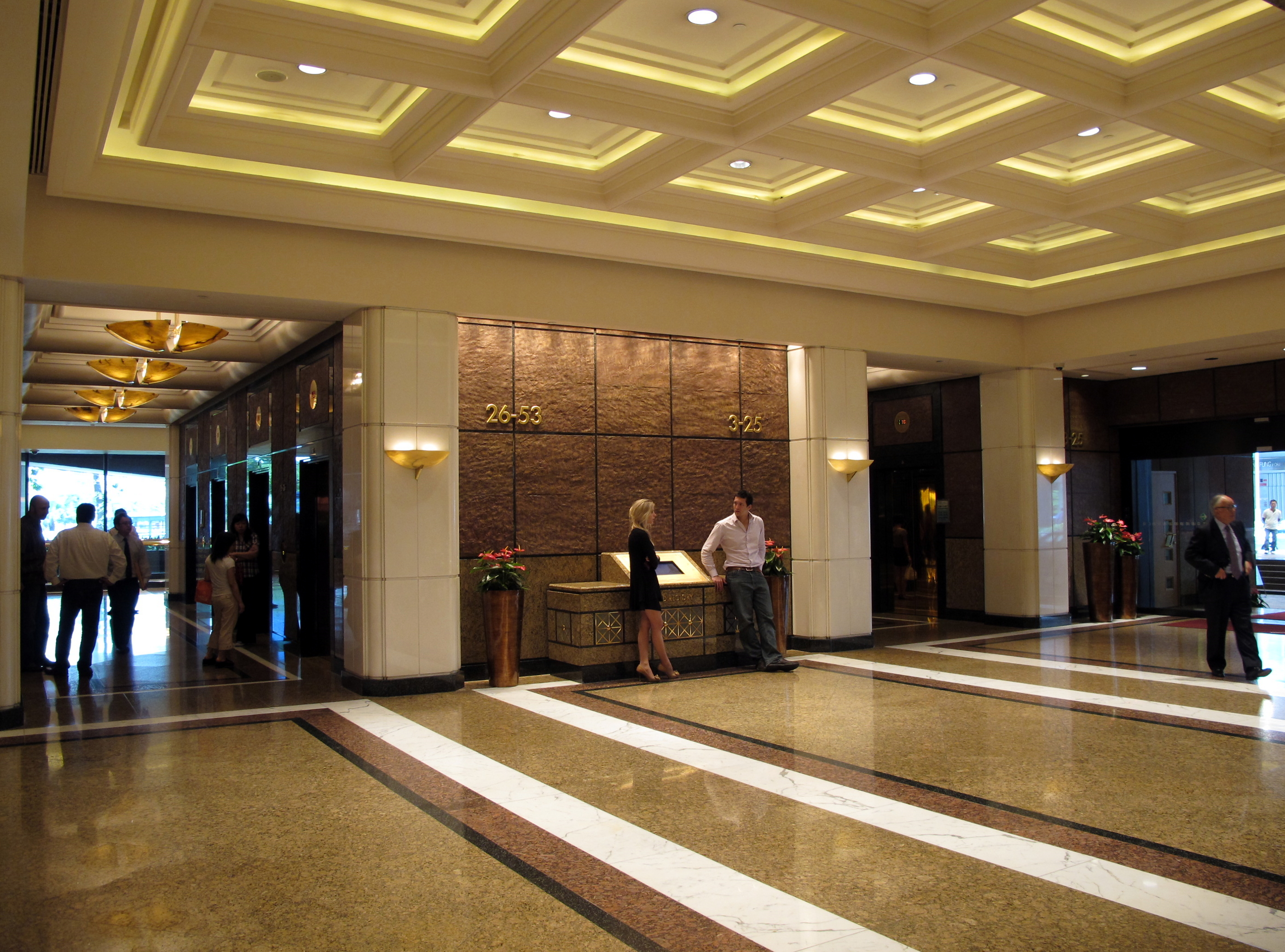
SHK Centre Office lobby

Sun Hung Kai Centre (Chinese: 新鴻基中心) is an office skyscraper in Wan Chai, Hong Kong Island, Hong Kong. It is 214.5 metres (704 ft) tall consisting of 56 floors. When the building was first completed in 1981, only 51 floors were present. Five extra storeys were added atop in 1991.

It serves as the corporate headquarters of Sun Hung Kai Properties.

The consulates of Brazil, Russia and Myanmar in Hong Kong are housed in the building. In July 2019 the Russian consulate located within was hit by an online bomb threat originating from a user calling himself "chichoonkeat".

== See also ==
- List of tallest buildings in Hong Kong
