= The Leighton Hill =

Luxury Housing estate in Leighton Hill, Hong Kong

Coordinates: 22.2761°N 114.1840°E

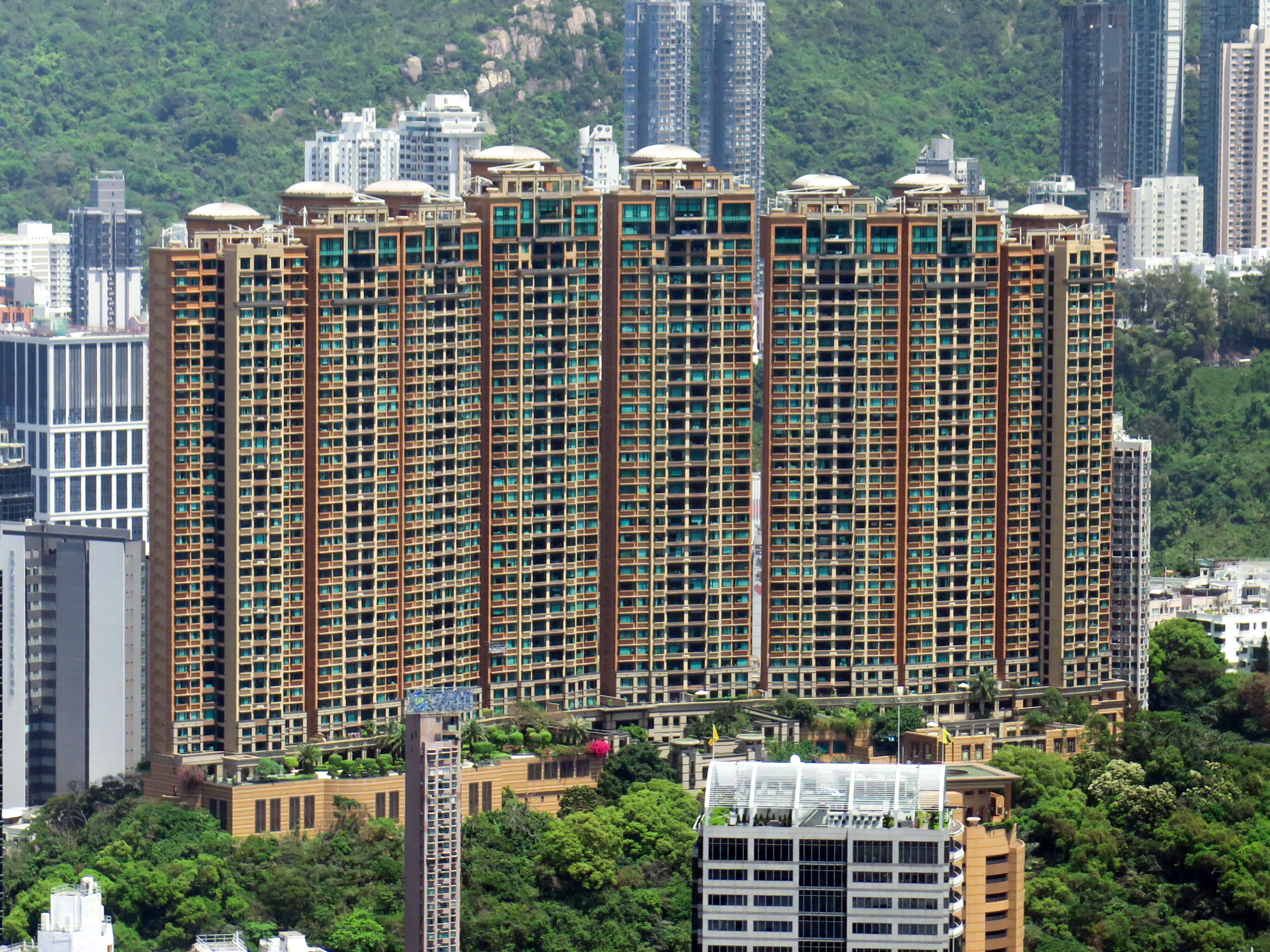
The Leighton Hill

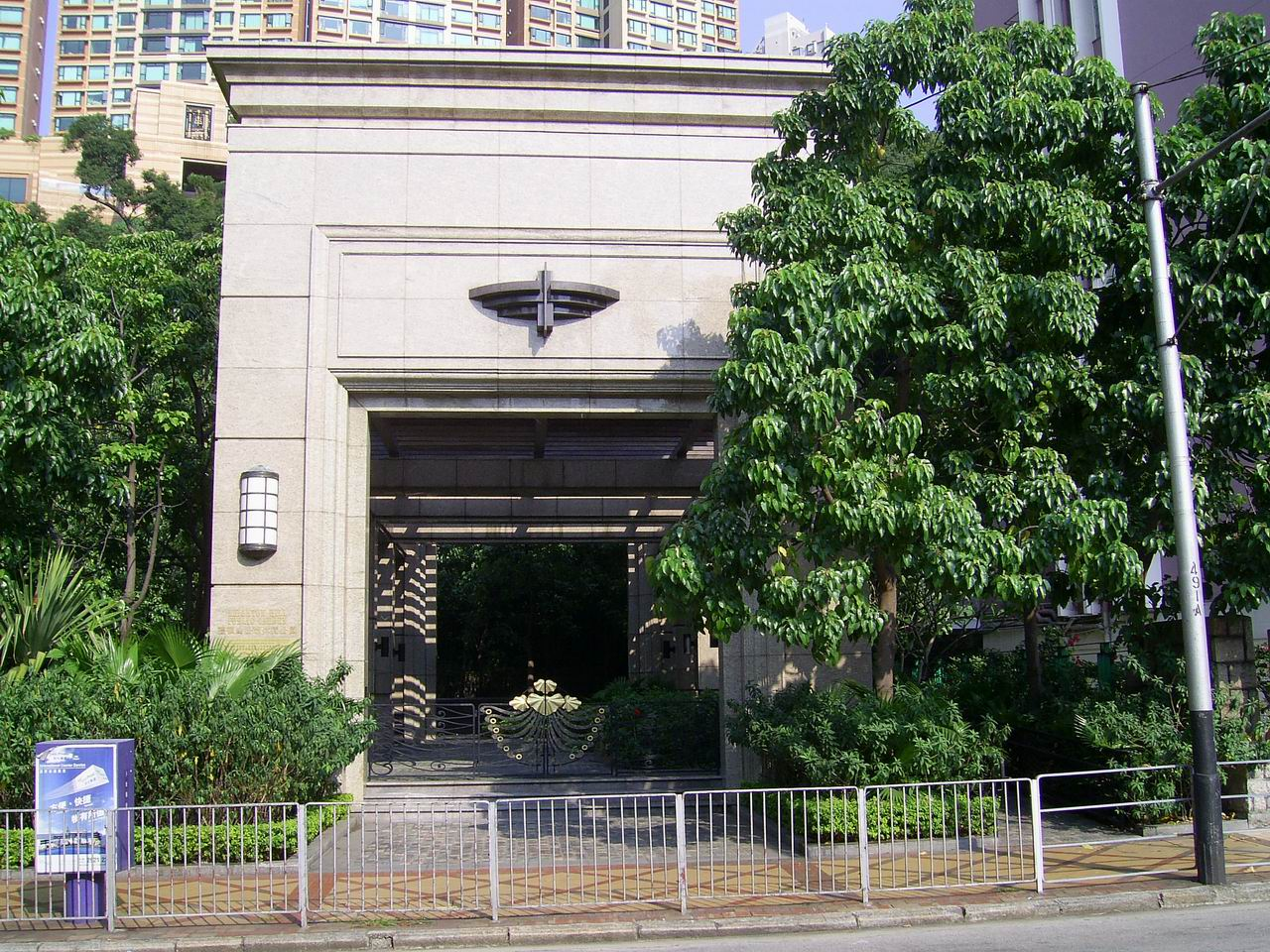
Public Garden of The Leighton Hill

The Leighton Hill (Chinese: 禮頓山) is a private luxury housing estate in Leighton Hill, Happy Valley, Hong Kong. It is an upmarket residential development that overlooks the Happy Valley Racecourse and neighboring Caroline Hill.

Formerly Leighton Hill Government Quarters and Harcourt Place, the estate consists of 8 high-rise buildings with a total of 544 units developed by Sun Hung Kai Properties and Hysan Development in 2002. It also includes a public community hall managed by Home Affairs Department.

Large scale high-rise blocks such as these are rare in the area, adding to the prestige of these buildings. Higher floor units include balconies while those on the bottom floor are allocated private garden spaces. The two central towers are taller with an impressive internal ceiling height that ranges between 3.4-3.6m per floor. Ceilings in other blocks stand at 3.15m.

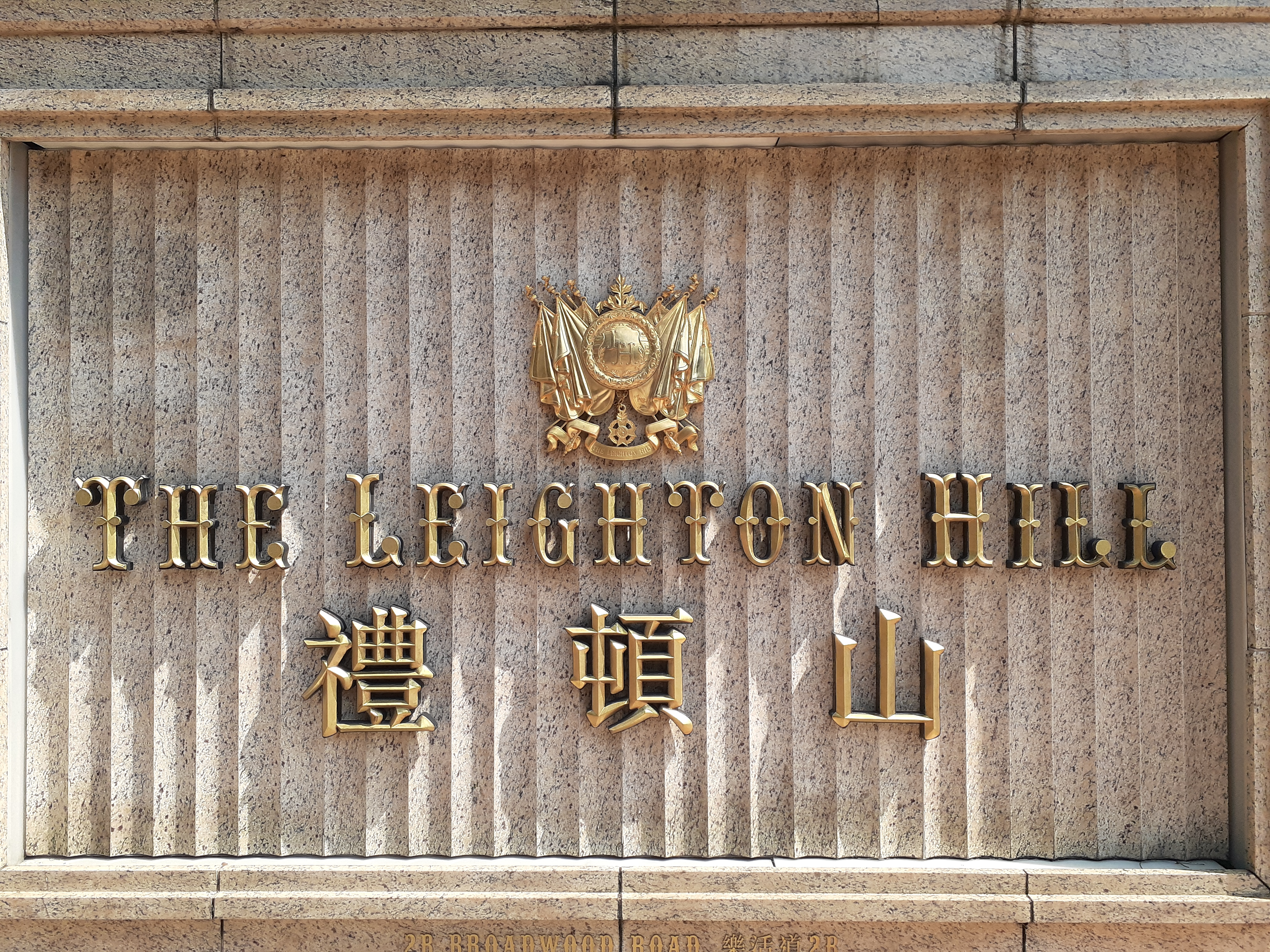

== Price range ==
Prices range from 70 Million HKD to 300 Million HKD (US$9 Million to US$38 Million) per flat.

Price Range
Area(SFA/GFA)	Layout	Price(HK$/US$)	Rent(HK$/US$)
1,724 / 2,238 ft²	4Beds, 2Baths	$98M / $13M	N/A
1,724 / 2,238 ft²	4Beds, 3Baths	$120M / $16M	N/A
3,485 / 4,393 ft²	5Beds, 4Baths	$268M / $35.1M	$288,493 / $37,213
3,485 / 4,393 ft²	5Beds, 4Baths	$298M / $40M	N/A

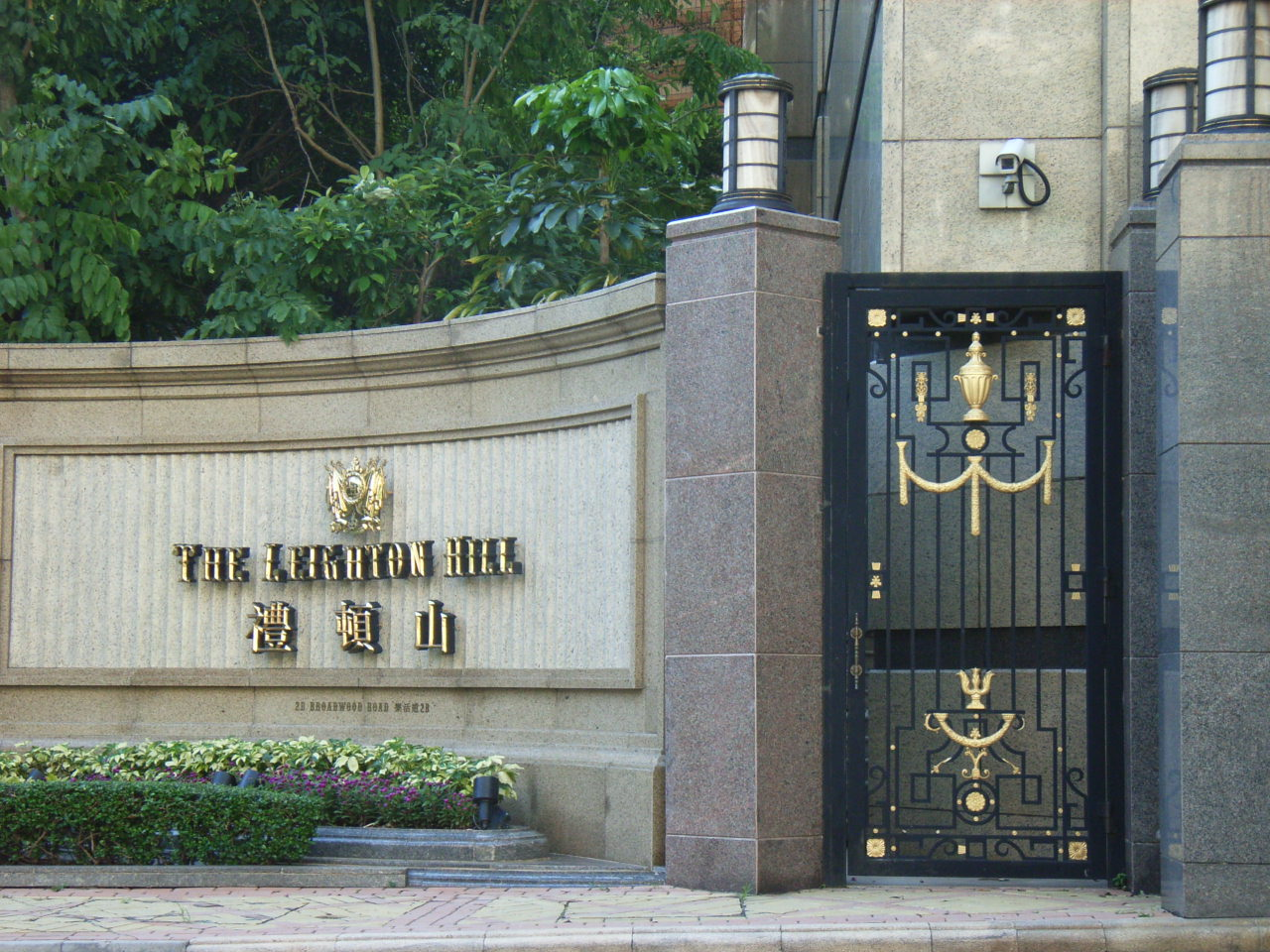
The Leighton Hill at Broadwood Road entrance

Median Price per Square Feet: HKD 42.38k/SQ.FT, US$5.5k/SQ.FT

Median Rent: HKD 180k/Month, US$23k/Month

== Residents ==
Many celebrities, high net worth individuals, CEOs, Principal Officials of the Hong Kong are the residents of the estate, including Adam Cheng, a veteran actor in TVB, Rafael Hui, former Chief Secretary for Administration of Hong Kong, and Paul Chan, Financial Secretary of Hong Kong.

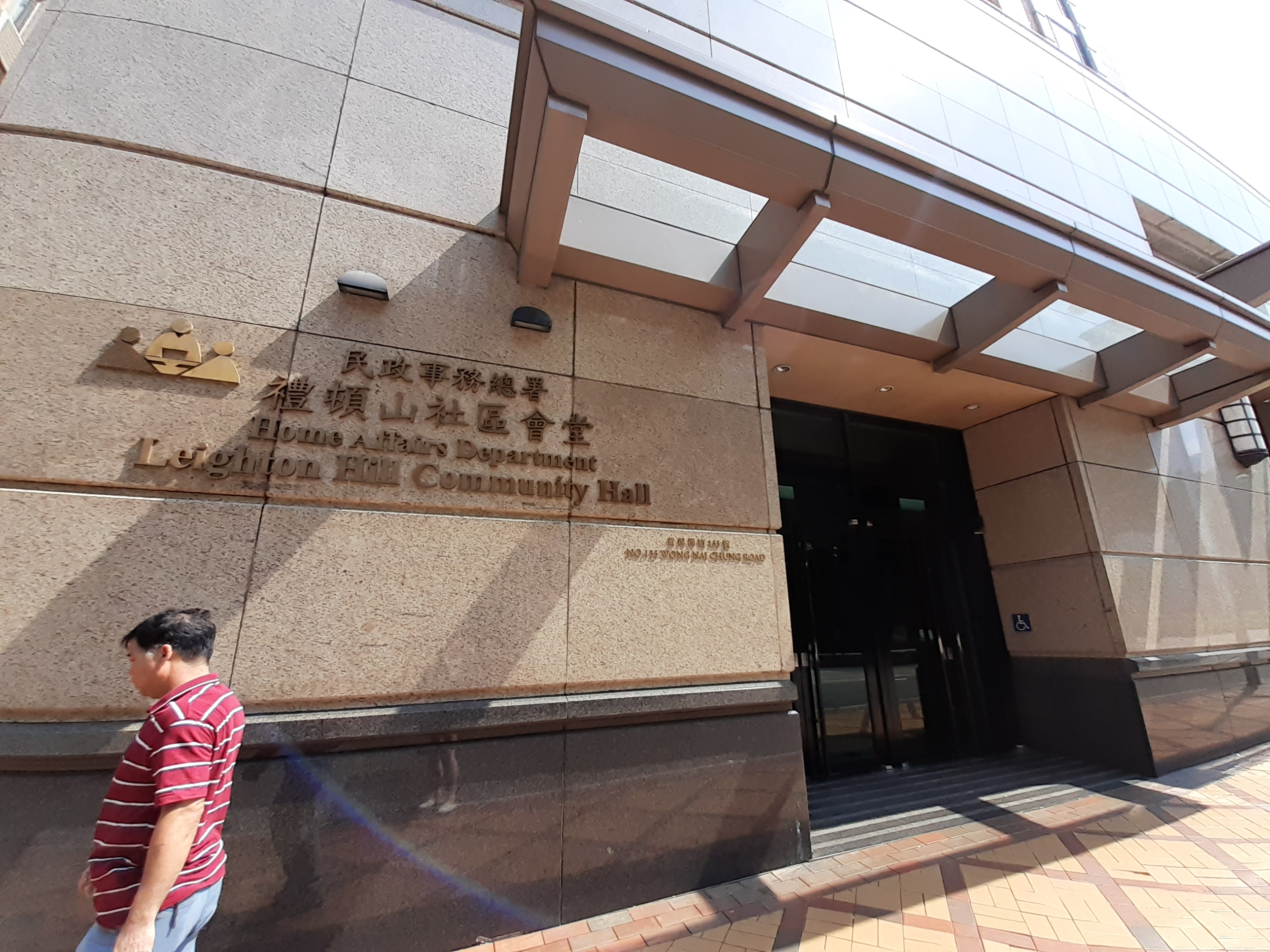
Leighton Hill Community Hall
