= National Employment Service (Albania) =

Government agency of Albania

- Zyra Kombëtare e Punësimit
- Official logo

Employment agency overview
- Jurisdiction: Albania
- Headquarters: Tirana
- Employment agency executive: Genc Kojdheli, Director General
- Website: www.puna.gov.al

The National Employment Service (SHKP) (Albanian: Shërbimi Kombëtar i Punësimit) is a government agency in Albania dispositioned to offer opportunities and fulfill the rights of citizens to gain profitable employment, receive professional counseling and qualifications for any such employment and also receive financial income support through its network of employment offices around the country.
