= Leighton Hill =

Hill and neighborhood in Hong Kong

Coordinates: 22°16′34.29″N 114°11′1.78″E

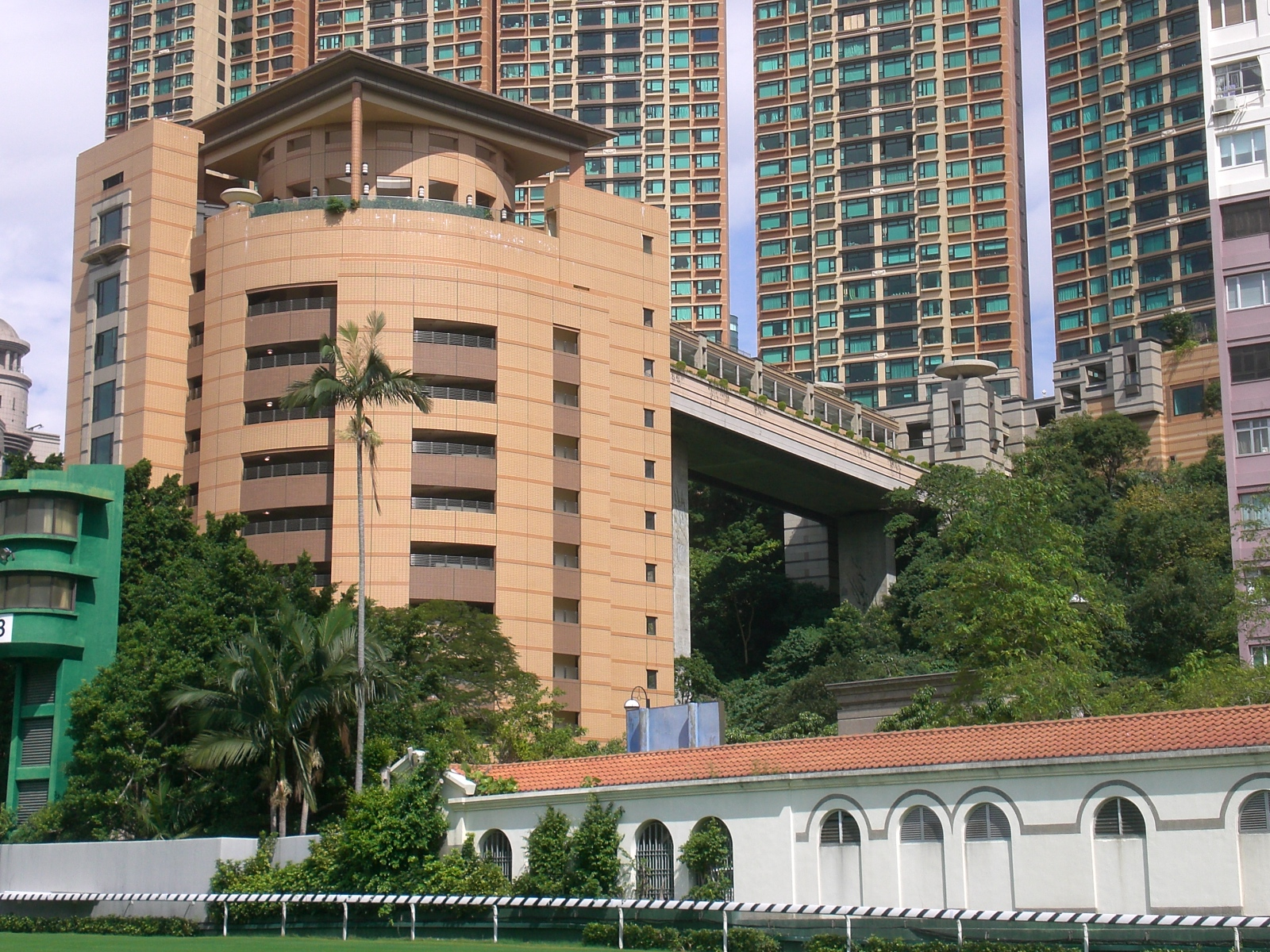
Bridge leading to The Leighton Hill housing estate, built on Leighton Hill.

Leighton Hill (Chinese: 禮頓山) is a hill between Causeway Bay and Happy Valley, and the south of Leighton Road, Hong Kong.

== History ==
The exact origins of the name is unclear, but there is reference to a merchant named Leighton whom owned town lot at nearby Caroline Hill in the 1840s. A H. Leighton acquired a marine lot in 1841. In the 1842 map the hill is also noted with names J. P. Larkins (Captain John Paul Larkins of the East India Company).

There were several air-raid shelters at the downhill of Leighton Hill to protect Victoria City from Japanese occupation during the Battle of Hong Kong in World War II.

== Features ==
In 2002, a private housing estate with the same name The Leighton Hill was built.

== Transport ==
=== Buses ===
- 601
- 680 / 680A / 680B /6 80P
- 690
- 1 / 1M / 1P
- 8X
- 10
- 19P
- 76
- 112
- 117

=== Minibus ===
- 5
- 26
- 30

=== Tram ===
- Kennedy Town to Happy Valley
- Shau Kei Wan to Happy Valley
