= Kwong Siu-hing =

20th and 21st-century Hong Kong businesswoman

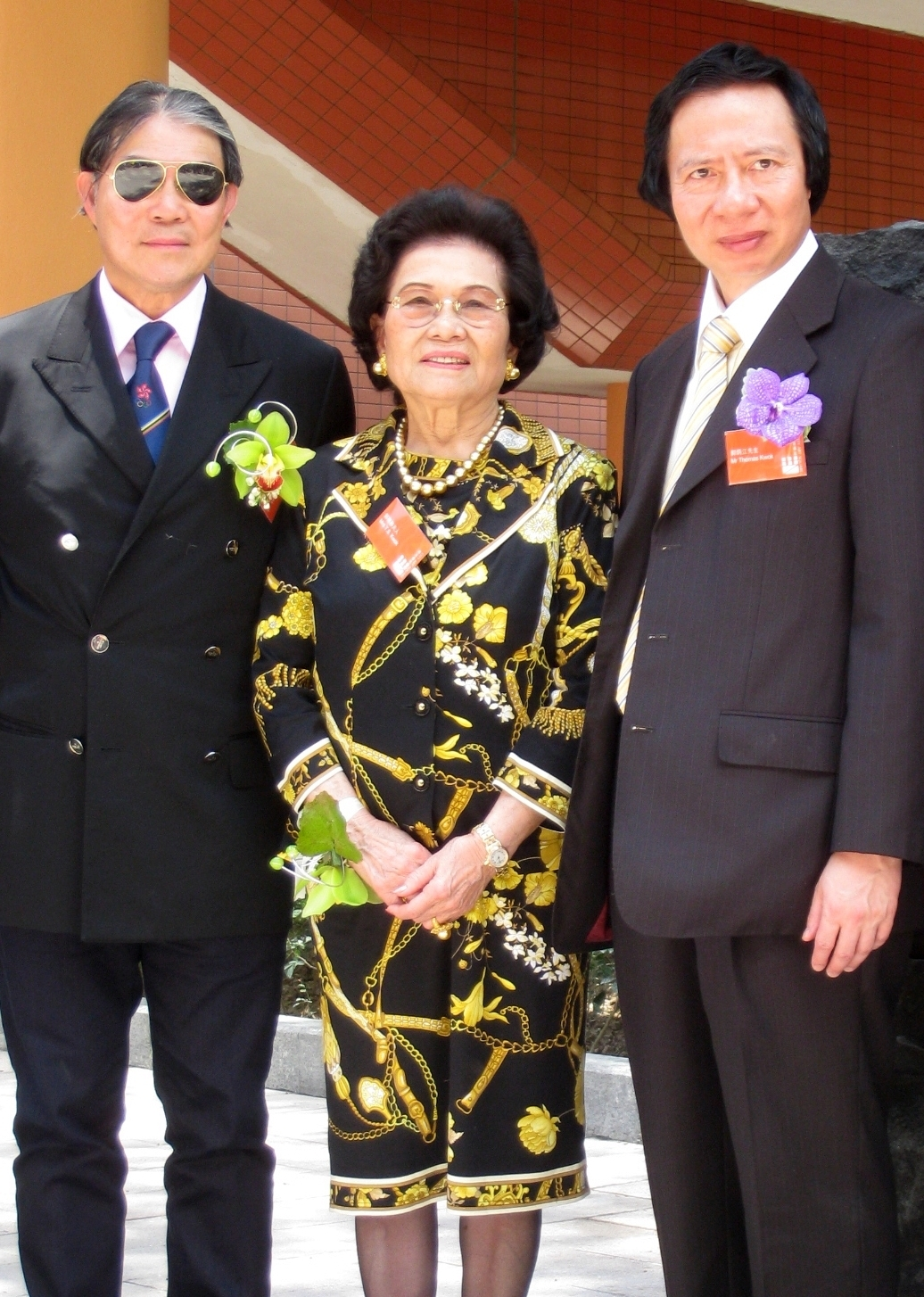
- Kwong Siu-hing (centre) flanked by Timothy Fok (left) and her son, Thomas (right) in July 2008
- Born: Kwong Siu-hing (鄺肖卿); December 2, 1929 (age 96); Hua County, Guangdong, China
- Occupation: Company director
- Years active: 2008–2011
- Board member of: Sun Hung Kai Properties (former chairperson and non-executive director)
- Spouse: Kwok Tak-seng
- Children: Walter Kwok; Thomas Kwok; Raymond Kwok

Chinese name
- Traditional Chinese: 鄺肖卿
- Simplified Chinese: 邝肖卿
- Jyutping: kwong3 ciu3 hing1
Transcriptions
Standard Mandarin
- Hanyu Pinyin: Kuàng Xiàoqīng
Yue: Cantonese
- Jyutping: kwong3 ciu3 hing1

Kwong Siu-hing, or sometimes Kwok Kwong Siu-hing (Chinese: 郭鄺肖卿; born 2 December 1929), is the matriarch of the Kwok family. She controls the conglomerate Sun Hung Kai Properties, the largest property developer in Hong Kong as of 2019. As of 2008, Kwong effectively controls about 41.53% of SHK Properties' shares through a family trust, so she was deemed as the largest shareholder of the company, with a net worth of 19.4 billion dollars as of February 2026.

== Family ==
Kwong is the widow of Kwok Tak-seng, the founder of Sun Hung Kai Properties, and the mother of Walter, Thomas and Raymond, directors of the company. She moved from mainland China to British Hong Kong in 1947, on the eve of the Second Chinese Civil War.

According to the South China Morning Post, prior to her 2008 appointment as chairperson, she "had never sat on the board of a Hong Kong company". On 27 May 2008, Kwong replaced her son Walter when he was ousted as chairperson of the company; she stepped down from the position in late 2011. Walter Kwok also had a bitter rivalry with his brothers, which ended in division of the family fortune.

The Kwok family was ranked as the third in Forbes's 2017 Asia's Richest Families, with a net worth of US$40.4 billion. In a separate ranking, her sons Thomas and Raymond were collectively ranked as the fourth-richest in Hong Kong as of 2018 by the annual Forbes' Hong Kong's 50 Richest list; The two younger brothers were ranked as 77th in the 2018 list of The World's Billionaires, with a net worth of US$16.5 billion at that time. Walter Kwok was ranked 10th in Hong Kong and 190th in the world, also by Forbes. His estimated net worth at that time was US$8 billion. In February 2019, she ranked 78th in the Billionaires 2019 list and 5th in the Hong Kong's 50 Richest 2019 list with a net worth of US$15.1 billion.

Kwong's son Walter died on 20 October 2018.

== See also ==
- Four big families of Hong Kong § Other definitions, defining some notable families of Hong Kong, with membership changing from time to time.
