= Walter Kwok =

Hong Kong businessman (1950–2018)

Walter Kwok Ping-sheung
- 郭炳湘
- Born: 1950; British Hong Kong
- Died: 20 October 2018 (aged 68); Happy Valley, Hong Kong
- Education: Imperial College London
- Occupation: Businessman
- Known for: Former chairman and CEO, Sun Hung Kai Properties; Founder, Empire Group Holdings
- Spouses: Lydia Ku (m. 1982; div. 1983) Wendy Lee (m. 1983; until his death 2018)
- Children: 3
Parent
Kwok Tak-seng	(father)
Kwong Siu-hing	(mother)
- Relatives: Thomas, Raymond (brothers)

Walter Kwok Ping-sheung
- Chinese: 郭炳湘
- Cantonese Yale: Gwok Bíng-sēung
- Jyutping: Gwok3 Bing2soeng1
Transcriptions
Standard Mandarin
- Hanyu Pinyin: Guō Bǐngxiāng
- Gwoyeu Romatzyh: Guo Biingshiang
- IPA: [kwó pìŋ.ɕjáŋ]
Yue: Cantonese
- Yale Romanization: Gwok Bíng-sēung
- Jyutping: Gwok3 Bing2soeng1
- IPA: [kʷɔk̚˧ pɪŋ˧˥.sœŋ˥]

Walter Kwok Ping-sheung JP (Chinese: 郭炳湘; Cantonese pronunciation: [kʷɔk̚˧ pɪŋ˧˥.sœŋ˥]; 1950 – 20 October 2018) was a Hong Kong real estate developer. He was the eldest son of Kwok Tak-seng, founder of Sun Hung Kai Properties, and his wife Kwong Siu-hing. Following their father's death in 1990, he and his brothers Thomas and Raymond inherited Sun Hung Kai Properties.

Kwok, formerly chairman and CEO of Sun Hung Kai Properties, negotiated his departure from the family firm in 2010. His mother remains the controlling shareholder of the company, whilst his brothers manage the firm. The Kwok family was ranked third in 2017 Asia's Richest Families, with an estimated net worth of US$40.4 billion as of November 2017.

== Early life and family ==
Kwok was born in 1950 in British Hong Kong, the eldest son of Kwok Tak-seng, founder of Sun Hung Kai Properties, and his wife Kwong Siu-hing. The Kwok family's ancestral home was located in Zhongshan, Guangdong, formerly known as Xiangshan. Kwok was educated at Imperial College London in England, from which he earned a master's degree in civil engineering.

Kwok and his younger brothers Thomas and Raymond are together referred to by media as the Kwok brothers. Together they controlled the majority of Sun Hung Kai Properties (until ouster in 2008, see below section). As of March 2018, all three brothers were listed in the Forbes 2018 The World's Billionaires, with a net worth of US$16.5 billion (Thomas and Raymond) and US$8 billion (Walter only) respectively. In a separate listing, the Kwok family was listed as the third-richest in Forbes's 2017 Asia's Richest Families, with a net worth of US$40.4 billion as of November 2017. The net worth by Forbes as of his death was US$6.9 billion.

== Abduction ==
Kwok was kidnapped by the notorious gangster "Big Spender" Cheung Tze-keung on 30 September 1997, and was released seven days later without police intervention. Negotiations fronted by wife Wendy resulted in payment of a ransom rumoured to have been nine figures. Following his arrest in Guangzhou in 1998, Cheung confessed that he had put Kwok in a wooden container blindfolded for four days, and fed him regular meals of roast pork with rice, until the ransom of some HK$600 million was paid. The ransom in 1,000-dollar notes was packed inside 20 large carrier bags and driven in two Mercedes saloon cars to a quiet lane in Central district. After the kidnapping, the badly shaken Kwok handed over the executive duties of SHKP to his younger brothers while retaining the title of chairman and chief executive. His abductor, Cheung, was captured in Guangzhou, China, and executed in December 1998.

== Later chairmanship ==
As a result of his kidnapping ordeal, Kwok reportedly developed deep psychological problems. While Kwok retained the titles of chairman and chief executive, his two brothers Thomas and Raymond controlled day-to-day operations of the group.

Under Kwok's later chairmanship, press reported that a former girlfriend, Ida Tong, had become increasingly influential in decision making. This influence has led to business decisions by Kwok that departed from its previous conservative model, and without the consensus of his brothers.

== Ouster ==
On 18 February 2008, Sun Hung Kai Properties issued a statement saying Kwok would take a temporary leave of absence for personal reasons with immediate effect. Kwok later issued a statement stating he would take a personal holiday to travel to the United States, Beijing and other cities in the coming two to three months, adding he would resume his duties on his return. However, Kwok was formally removed as the chairman on 27 May, with his mother Kwong Siu-hing taking over as chairperson. Kwok remained as one of the non-executive directors until his resignation in 2014.

The Sing Tao Daily and sister publication The Standard reported that the family matriarch Kwong Siu-hing, wielding the holding of the Sun Hung Kai trust, intervened to oust Kwok from his chairman position to protect the family's interests. It was said that Tong's influence as Kwok's mistress of four years had caused friction with his brothers.

Kwok founded Empire Group Holdings in 2010. Empire Group Holdings was incorporated in Hong Kong, and was notable for forming joint ventures with other real estate developers in the bidding of the leasehold of Government Land, such as the Hong Kong Ferry in August 2016 and Sino Land in October 2016. The group also acquired the rights to re-develop and operate the former site of the Mariners' Club in Tsim Sha Tsui, despite not owning the re-developed properties.

In 2012, Kwok's younger brothers Thomas and Raymond, as well as Rafael Hui, previously the second-highest ranking government official in Hong Kong, were arrested by the city's anti-corruption agency on suspicion of bribery. Thomas Kwok and Rafael Hui were sentenced to prison, while Raymond Kwok was acquitted. It is suggested that Walter Kwok, who was not arrested, provided information to the authorities in retaliation for his ousting from Sun Hung Kai Properties.

Kwok also sued his brothers to revoke the agreement on the distribution of the family fortune. According to his testimony in the court proceedings, he received some real estate in the United States, but of lesser value than what his brothers received.

== Personal life ==
Kwok's parents introduced him to Lydia Ku Chee-yung, the daughter of a wealthy businessman from Shanghai, whom he married on 15 September 1982, but the marriage broke up six months later.

Kwok married Wendy Lee Ting-wing in 1983. They had two sons, Geoffrey and Jonathan, and a daughter.

Kwok died at Hong Kong Adventist Hospital – Stubbs Road on 20 October 2018, two months after suffering a stroke. He was 68.

== See also ==
- List of kidnappings
- List of solved missing person cases: 1950–1999
