= Raymond Kwok =

Hong Kong entrepreneur

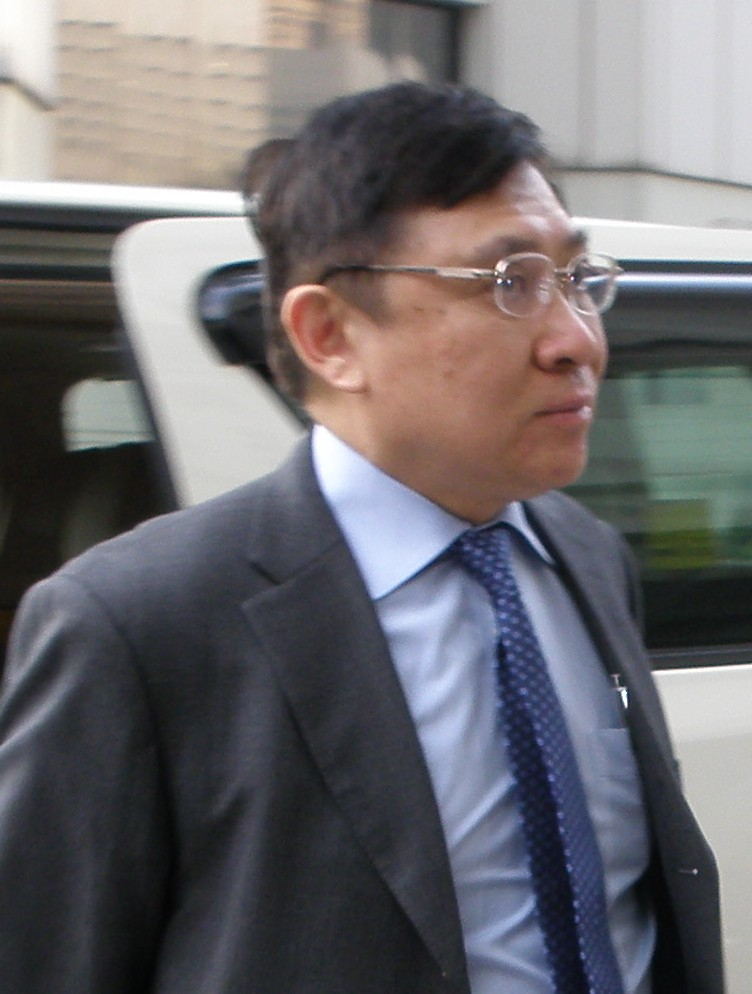
- Born: 1953 (age 72–73); British Hong Kong
- Education: Cambridge University (BA Law); Harvard Business School (M.B.A.)
- Occupations: Chairman & managing director of Sun Hung Kai Properties
- Parent(s): Kwok Tak Seng (father); Kwong Siu-hing (mother)
- Relatives: Walter, Thomas (brothers)

Raymond Kwok
- Traditional Chinese: 郭炳聯
- Simplified Chinese: 郭炳联
Transcriptions
Standard Mandarin
- Hanyu Pinyin: Guō Bǐnglián
Yue: Cantonese
- Jyutping: gwok^{3} bing^{2}-lyun^{4}

Raymond Kwok Ping-luen JP (Chinese: 郭炳聯, born 20 April 1953) is the chairman and managing director of Sun Hung Kai Properties, the largest property developer in Hong Kong. He is the chairman of SUNeVision Holdings Ltd. and SmarTone Telecommunications Holdings Limited. He is the youngest son of Kwok Tak Seng, and the youngest brother of Walter Kwok, and Thomas Kwok.

== Wealth ==
The Kwok brothers are the third wealthiest people in Hong Kong and Greater China Region, just after Li Ka Shing and Lee Shau Kee. Their combined wealth is estimated to be US$17 billion in Forbes' 2011 list of billionaires. Their combined wealth rose to $17.9 billion in 2016. According to Forbes, the Kwok family as a whole is the third richest family in Asia, with a net worth of US$40.4 billion.

== Education ==
Kwok holds a law degree from Cambridge University, an MBA from Harvard University, an Honorary Doctorate in Business Administration from the Open University of Hong Kong and an Honorary Doctorate in Laws from the Chinese University of Hong Kong.

== Bribery charges ==
In March 2012, Raymond Kwok and Thomas Kwok were arrested on bribery charges. In March 2013, Thomas and Raymond Kwok pleaded not guilty to corruption charges involving payments and loans to Hong Kong's former Chief Secretary for Administration Rafael Hui. In December 2014, Raymond Kwok was cleared of all charges, while his brother Thomas was convicted of "conspiracy to commit misconduct in public office."

== Election Committee ==
In September 2021, the Liaison Office ordered members of the Election Committee to spend 2 hours talking to the public; Kwok spent a few minutes at his booth, and then left.
