= Kwok Tak-seng =

Hong Kong businessman

Kwok Tak-Seng
- Born: 12 March 1911; Portuguese Macau
- Died: 30 October 1990 (aged 79); Happy Valley, Hong Kong
- Known for: Sun Hung Kai Properties
- Spouse(s): First: Wong Sau-king; Second: Kwong Siu-hing
- Children: Son: Walter, Thomas and Raymond; Daughter: Kwok Yin-ping, Kwok Yuen-kwan and Kwok Yuen-yee

Chinese name
- Traditional Chinese: 郭得勝
- Simplified Chinese: 郭得胜
- Jyutping: Kwok Tak1 Seng1
Transcriptions
Standard Mandarin
- Hanyu Pinyin: Guō Déshèng
Yue: Cantonese
- Jyutping: Kwok Tak1 Seng1

Kwok Tak-seng OBE (12 March 1911 – 30 October 1990) was a Hong Kong businessman. He was the founder of Sun Hung Kai Properties, one of the major property developers in Hong Kong.

== Early life ==
Kwok was born in Macau. The ancestral home of the Kwok family was located in Zhongshan, Guangdong, formerly known as Xiangshan. He emigrated to Hong Kong after World War II.

== Career ==
Kwok partnered with Fung King-hey and Lee Shau-kee to establish Sun Hung Kai Enterprises, a predecessor of Sun Hung Kai Properties in 1963. Sun Hung Kai Properties was publicly listed in Hong Kong in 1972 and soon became one of the top companies listed on the Stock Exchange of Hong Kong by market capitalisation.

Kwok was appointed OBE in the 1986 Birthday Honours.

Kwok also served as a non-executive director of fellow developer New World Development.

== Personal life ==
Kwok married Kwong Siu-hing. They have three sons, Walter Kwok, Thomas Kwok, and Raymond Kwok.

On 30 October 1990, Kwok died of a heart attack. Kwok was 79.

Kwok was succeeded as chairman of Sun Hung Kai by his eldest son, Walter. In 2008, after a very public intra-family tussle, his wife Kwong Siu-hing became chairman.
