= Thomas Kwok =

Hong Kong businessman (born 1951)

Thomas Kwok Ping-kwong
- 郭炳江
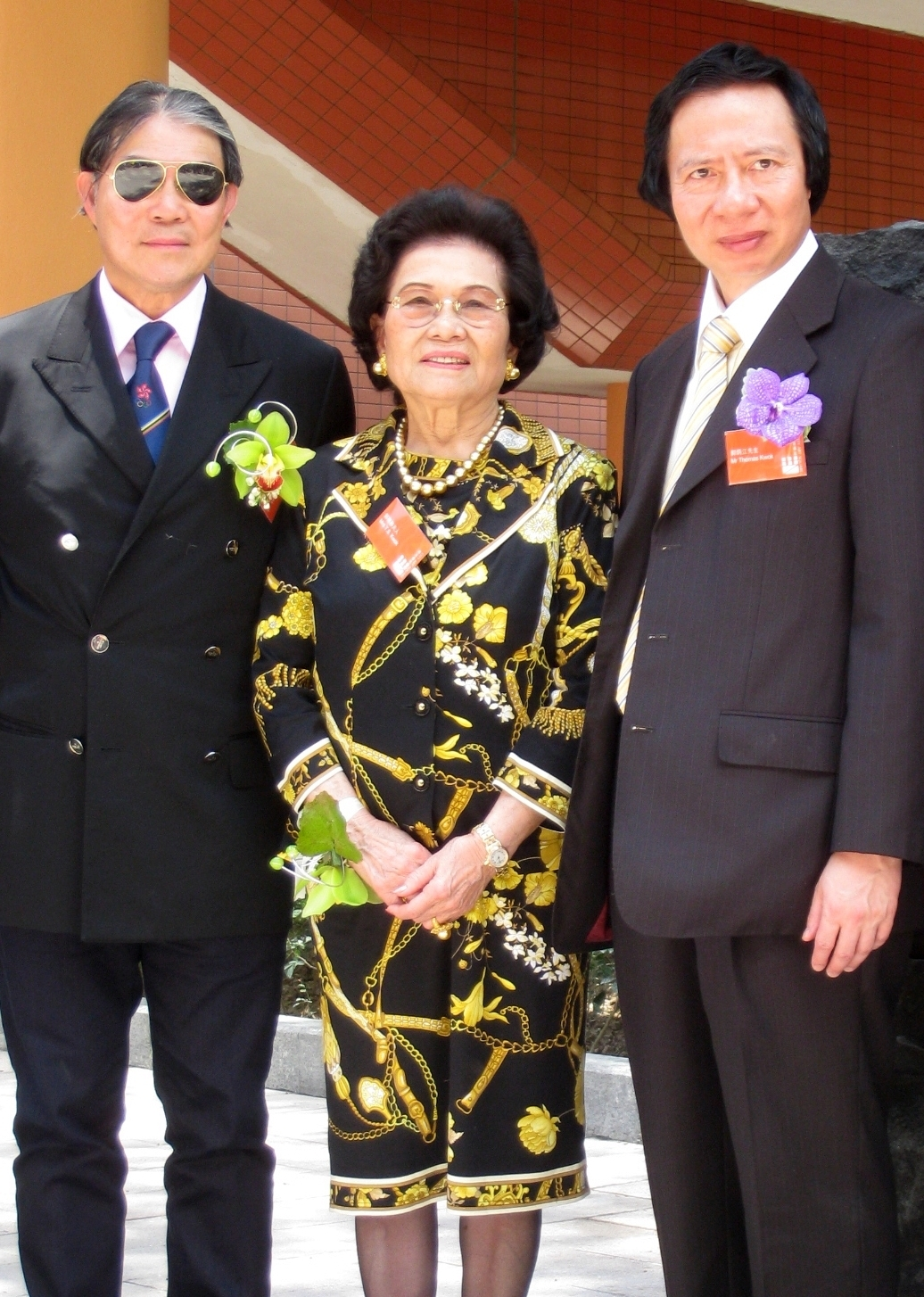
- Kwok (right) and Timothy Fok (left) flanking Kwok's mother Kwong Siu-hing in July 2008
- Born: October 6, 1951 (age 74); Portuguese Macau
- Education: London Business School; Imperial College
- Occupation: Former joint-chairman of Sun Hung Kai Properties
- Children: Adam Kwok
- Parent(s): Kwok Tak Seng (father); Kwong Siu-hing (mother)
- Relatives: Walter Kwok (brother); Raymond Kwok (brother)
- Criminal information
- Criminal information
- Status: Was incarcerated at the Stanley Prison; Released on 21 March 2019
- Conviction: Conspiracy to commit misconduct in public office
- Penalty: Completed 5 year sentence

Thomas Kwok Ping-kwong (Chinese: 郭炳江; pinyin: Guō Bǐngjiāng; Cantonese Yale: Gwok Bínggōng; born October 6, 1951) is a Hong Kong billionaire, and the former joint chairman and managing director (with his brother Raymond Kwok) of Sun Hung Kai Properties, the largest property developer in Hong Kong. He received a five-year prison sentence for bribery in 2014.

== Biography ==
Thomas is the second son of Kwok Tak Seng, the founder of SHK Properties, and his wife Kwong Siu-hing. Together with brothers Walter and Raymond, they inherited Sun Hung Kai Properties, Hong Kong's largest real estate developer in 1990, following their father's death. The Kwok brothers are the third wealthiest people in Hong Kong and the Greater China Region, just after Li Ka-shing and Lee Shau Kee. Their combined wealth is estimated to be US$16.5 billion in Forbes' 2018 list of billionaires. According to Forbes, the Kwok family as a whole is the third-richest family in Asia, with a net worth of US$40.4 billion.

Kwok received a bachelor's degree in civil engineering from Imperial College London, University of London, followed by an MBA from the London Business School.

== Arrest and conviction ==
Thomas and Raymond Kwok were arrested by the Independent Commission Against Corruption on bribery charges in March 2012. They were accused of bribing Rafael Hui, the former Chief Secretary for Administration from 2005 to 2007, to be their "eyes and ears in government" in a case said to highlight "the cozy relationship between the city's powerful developers and government".

In December 2014, Thomas Kwok was convicted of "conspiracy to commit misconduct in public office," while his brother Raymond was cleared of all charges. Thomas was sentenced to five years in prison and a fine of $500,000. Rafael Hui, Sun Hung Kai executive Thomas Chan, and businessman Francis Kwan were also jailed. After the verdict was announced, Kwok stated his immediate resignation as chairman, managing director, and executive director of Sun Hung Kai, and said he would appeal the conviction. His appeals to the Court of Appeal and Hong Kong Court of Final Appeal were dismissed. Kwok, who had been granted bail pending appeal to the Court of Final Appeal, was returned to prison in June 2017. As a result of this conviction, the Silver Bauhinia Star conferred on him by the Hong Kong Government in 2007 was revoked in March 2018.

== Religion ==
Kwok is a Christian. The Noah's Ark project on Ma Wan reflects Kwok's evangelical Christian faith. During the 1990s, he set up a church on the 75th-floor pyramid atrium atop Sun Hung Kai's Central Plaza office complex.

== In popular culture ==
=== In television ===
- In the 2019 TVB miniseries ICAC Investigators 2022, the character Ronald Wong Long, played by Henry Yu Yang, is based on Thomas Kwok.
