= Sun Hung Kai Properties =

Real estate company

Sun Hung Kai Properties Limited

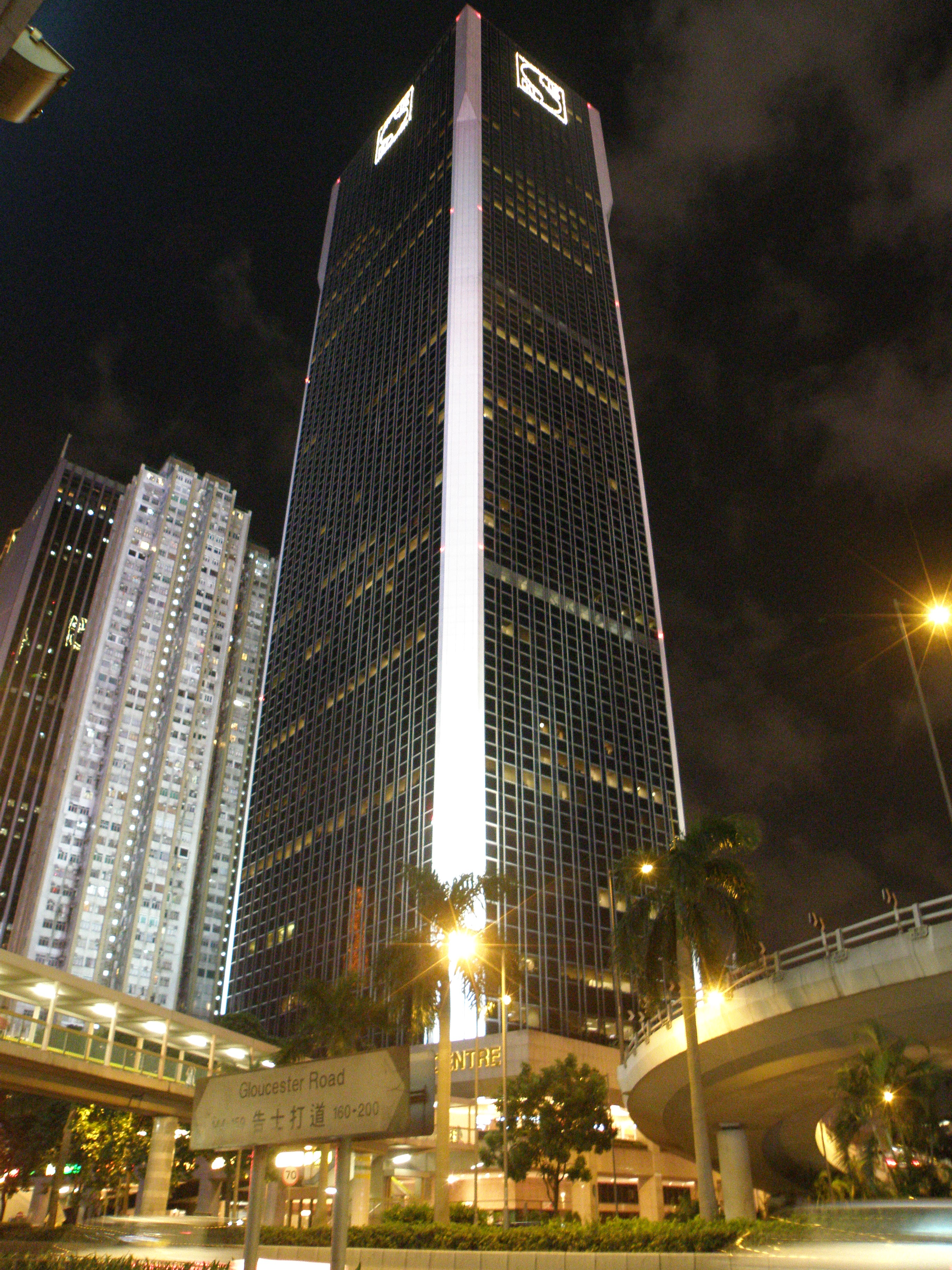
- Headquarters at Sun Hung Kai Centre
- Type: Public
- Traded as: SEHK: 16; Hang Seng Index component; S&P Asia 50 component
- ISIN: HK0016000132
- Industry: Real estate
- Predecessor: Sun Hung Kai Enterprises
- Founded: 1963; 63 years ago in Hong Kong (as SHK Enterprises); 1972; 54 years ago in Hong Kong (as SHK Properties)
- Founder: Kwok Tak Seng; Fung King Hey; Lee Shau Kee
- Headquarters: Sun Hung Kai Centre, Wan Chai, Hong Kong
- Key people: Raymond Kwok, Chairman and Managing Director
- Products: Property development, property investment, property management, hotels, telecommunications, information technology and infrastructure
- Revenue: ▲HK$79.721 billion (2025)
- Operating income: ▼HK$26.078 billion (2025)
- Net income: ▲HK$19.884 billion (2025)
- Total assets: ▼HK$816.893 billion (2025)
- Total equity: ▲HK$622.374 billion (2025)
- Number of employees: 38,000+ (2025)

Chinese name
- Traditional Chinese: 新鴻基地產發展有限公司
- Simplified Chinese: 新鸿基地产发展有限公司
- Literal meaning: Sun Hung Kai real estate development limited company
Transcriptions
Standard Mandarin
- Hanyu Pinyin: Xīnhóngjī Dìchǎn Fāzhǎn Yǒuxiàngōngsī
Yue: Cantonese
- Jyutping: san1 hung4 gei1 dei6 caan2 faat3 zin2 jau5 haan6 gung1 si1

short name
- Traditional Chinese: 新鴻基地產
- Simplified Chinese: 新鸿基地产
Transcriptions
Standard Mandarin
- Hanyu Pinyin: Xīnhóngjī Dìchǎn
Yue: Cantonese
- Jyutping: san1 hung4 gei1 dei6 caan2
- Website: www.shkp.com

Sun Hung Kai Properties Limited (SHKP) is a listed corporation and one of the largest property developers in Hong Kong. The company's businesses include property sales, property rental, telecommunications (SmarTone, SUNeVision), hotel operation, transport and logistics, and others. The company is controlled by the Kwok family trust, largely the Kwok brothers.

== History ==
=== Early years ===
The predecessor of the group, Sun Hung Kai Enterprises Co., Ltd. (Chinese: 新鴻基企業有限公司), was founded in 1963 by Kwok Tak-seng, together with Fung King-hey and Lee Shau Kee. The current legal entity of the holding company of the group, Sun Hung Kai Properties Limited, was incorporated on 14 July 1972 and was listed on the Hong Kong stock exchange on 23 August 1972.

In 1973, SHKP acquired Hong Yip Service Company Limited. In 1977, SHKP moved its head office to Connaught Centre, Central (now known as Jardine House).

In 1978, SHKP established Kai Shing Management Services Limited, a property manager.

In 1978, SHKP put on sale the first multi-block residential estate, Tsuen Wan Centre (first phase). Also in 1978, SHKP became one of the 33 constituent stocks listed on the Hang Seng Index.

In 1979, SHKP established Sun Hung Kai Properties Insurance Limited, which was a provider of general insurance.

=== 1980s and 1990s ===
In 1981, SHKP acquired an interest in Kowloon Motor Bus, a public transport provider. The corporation moved its headquarters to Sun Hung Kai Centre, on an area of newly reclaimed land in Wan Chai, in 1982.

In 1991, SHKP acquired Wilson Parking.

In 1992, SHKP finished the construction of Central Plaza in Wan Chai, the tallest building in Asia at the time of completion. In the same year the company diversified into mobile telephony with the establishment of SmarTone, now one of Hong Kong's dominant mobile providers. This subsidiary was listed in Hong Kong in 1996.

In 1993, SHKP acquired World Trade Centre, Causeway Bay. From the mid-1990s the company undertook property development related to the new airport railway, including sites at the Airport Express Hong Kong Station.

In 1998, Route 3 (Country Park Section) opened.

In 1999, Shanghai Central Plaza commercial building was completed.

=== 21st century ===
In 2000, SHKP won tender for Kowloon Station Development Packages 5, 6 & 7 – now the International Commerce Centre (ICC) complex. The complex was finished in 2010. The main building became the tallest building in Hong Kong at the time of completion.

On 17 March 2000, SUNeVision Holdings Limited, a subsidiary of SHKP, was listed on the Growth Enterprise Market of the Stock Exchange of Hong Kong.

In 2001, SHKP established the residential leasing division Signature Homes.

In 2002, SHKP set up SHKP – Kwok's Foundation. The foundation has actively supported charitable projects, focusing on education and training projects.

In 2003, the first phases of YOHO Town in Yuen Long went on sale. The same year, the company signed a land-use transfer agreement with Shanghai Lujiazui Finance and Trade Zone Development Company for Shanghai IFC project.

In 2005, SHKP opened APM, Hong Kong's first late-night retail centre.

In 2005, SHKP acquired Seiyu (Sha Tin) Company Limited.

In 2009, Ma Wan Park Noah's Ark opened, the first Christian theme park in Hong Kong.

In 2013, SHKP acquired a commercial site with 7.6 million square feet of gross floor area in the Shanghai Xujiahui district.

In 2015, SHKP became Title and Charity Sponsor of the first Hong Kong Cyclothon.

In 2016, SHKP donated land in Yuen Long to Hong Kong Sheng Kung Hui for the construction of an integrated service centre.

In 2019, SHKP won the tender for the commercial site atop the West Kowloon High-Speed Rail Terminus. SHKP's bid of more than HK$42 billion won the 60,000 square metre site, which could be used for office, shopping and hotel developments. The Kwok family invested HK$9.4 billion (US$1.2 billion) for a 25% stake in the office towers.

In June 2024, SHKP was among ten companies to receive the (Building and Construction Information) BCI Asia Top 10 Developers Award.

=== Corruption probe ===
In 2012, SHKP Executive Director Thomas Chan was arrested by the Independent Commission Against Corruption (ICAC) on 19 March, along with eight people linked to the company on 29 March. Co-Chairmen Thomas Kwok and Raymond Kwok and five others were arrested by the ICAC as part of an extensive corruption probe. Rafael Hui, former Chief Secretary, was also taken in for questioning. They were later released on bail. The probe caused a 15 per cent fall in the company's share price.

In December 2014, the jury convicted Thomas Kwok and Rafael Hui of HK$8,500,000 bribery, and Hui was convicted of four more charges relating to misconduct in public office. The jury acquitted Raymond Kwok of all charges.

=== List of chairmen ===
1. Kwok Tak-seng (1972–1990); founder
2. Walter Kwok (1990–2008); oldest son of Kwok Tak-seng
3. Kwong Siu-hing (2008–2011); wife of Kwok Tak-seng
4. Raymond Kwok and Thomas Kwok (2011–2014); joint chairmen, younger sons of Kwok Tak-seng
5. Raymond Kwok (2014– ); youngest son of Kwok Tak-seng

== Business development ==
=== Projects ===
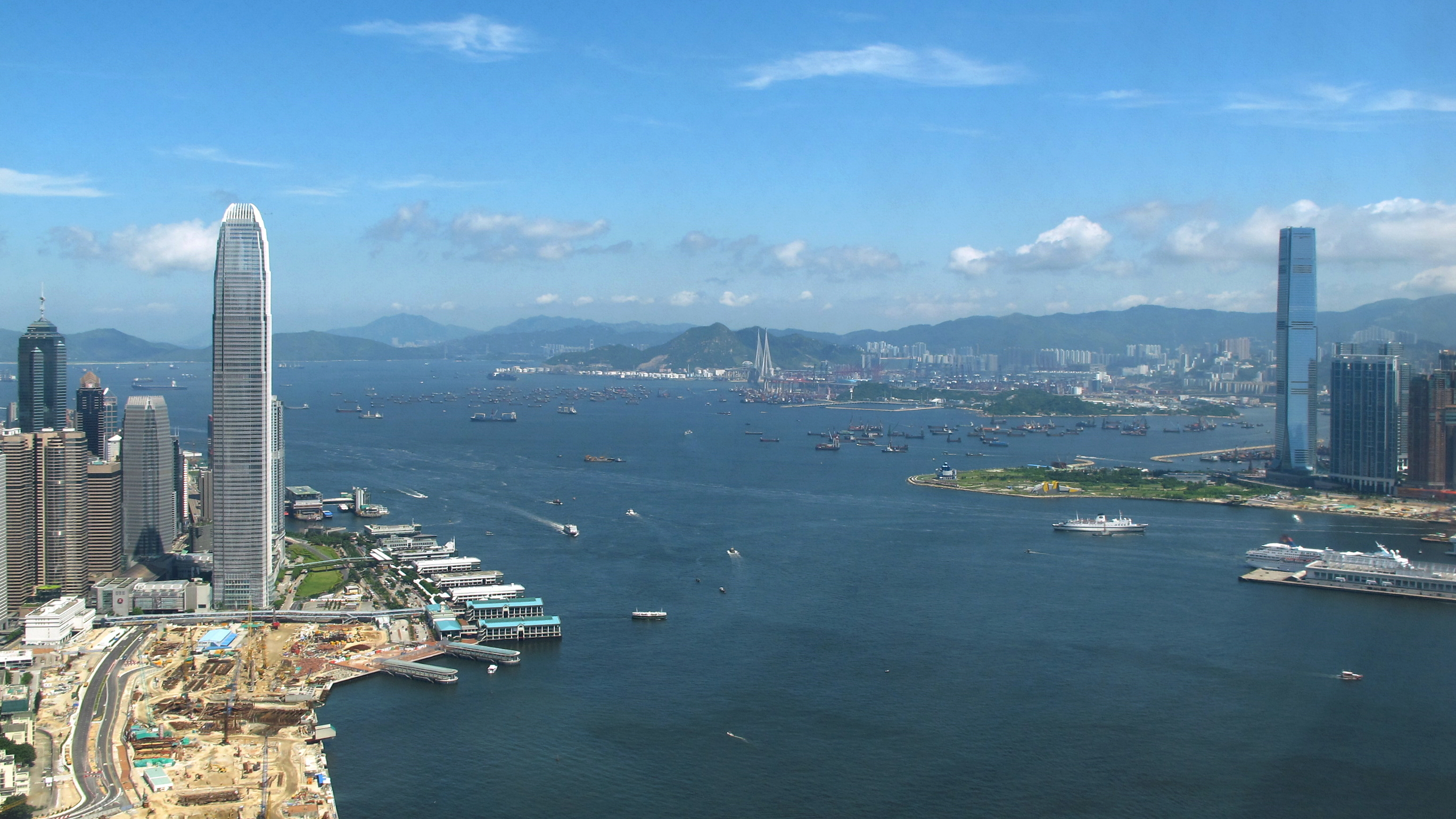
The International Finance Centre Tower 2 and the International Commerce Centre are the tallest buildings in Hong Kong.

In 1996, SHKP was the lead developer which had bid the sum of HK$5.5 billion to acquire the rights to develop Hong Kong's second-tallest building, the International Finance Centre. The MTR Corporation was a partner in the venture. Sun Hung Kai Properties, owns 47.5 per cent of the development, Henderson Land Development, whose chairman Lee Shau Kee sits on the SHKP board, took a 32.5 per cent stake in the project. SHKP also built the International Commerce Centre, the tallest building in Hong Kong.

=== Internal sale opacity ===
In 2005, the developer was criticised for the lack of transparency in its public sale of residential properties to speculators and end-users. The company was accused of the practice of "internal sales" of uncompleted units, the absence of sale price-lists, and also for hyping sales for flats in its The Arch development in West Kowloon by announcing inflated prices (per square metre) achieved. A buyer apparently paid HK$168 million, or HK$31,300 per square foot, for a 5,360-square-foot (498 m^{2}) penthouse. Sweeteners were allegedly given (discounts given to the same purchaser on other units bought), but were excluded from the calculation. This allowed SHK to raise prices of the next batch of 500 units by 5–10 percent. But SHKP has denied the allegations.

=== Sibling fallout ===
On 18 February 2008, SHKP announced that Walter Kwok, chairman and chief executive, would take a "temporary leave of absence for personal reasons with immediate effect". Walter Kwok announced that he would take a "personal holiday", handing over his duties to his two younger brothers.

The Standard reported that the elder Kwok was removed from his position by his mother, who is the controlling shareholder of the company, to protect the family interests. The journal revealed that Walter's mistress of 4 years has been wielding increasing power in the business, and causing friction with his brothers.

The day after SHKP's announcement, its stock price declined against the general market. Corporate communications issued a second statement insisting that the business would not be affected and that Walter would resume his functions after his leave of 2 to 3 months. Walter's mistress, named by the press as Ida Tong Kam-Hing (唐錦馨), had apparently introduced property transactions valued at HK$4 billion to the Group or to the Kwoks' private investment vehicles. Company spokesmen stated that no person named Ida Tong was employed by the Group.

On 29 February, tycoon and fellow board member Lee Shau Kee confirmed that Mrs. Kwok forced the leave of absence upon Walter over Ida Tong during the last board meeting.

On 16 May 2008, Walter filed a writ with the High Court which claimed that Walter reached an agreement with his mother and two brothers in February that he would return to his duties if certain conditions were met. Walter alleged that his two brothers violated the agreement by attempting to remove him despite having fulfilled the predefined criteria, including procuring at least two medical opinions showing he is fit to return. Walter secured a last-minute injunction to delay the vote, to allow more time for discussions. On the sidelines of the dispute to remove Walter as chairman and CEO, Walter and his brothers claim the other(s) made major management decisions unwisely and without consultation.

== Financing and assets ==
SHKP was publicly listed in 1972 and is one of the largest property companies in Hong Kong. It develops residential and commercial projects for sale and investment. It employs more than 38,000 people and its services include land acquisition, architecture, construction, engineering and property management. It achieved a revenue of HK$85,302 million in the financial year 2018/19, with a profit attributable to shareholders of HK$44,912 million. The majority of its revenues and operating profit were derived from property sales and rental.

=== Land bank ===
As of 30 June 2019, the Group had a land bank in Hong Kong of 58.0 million square feet in terms of attributable gross floor area, consisting of 32.9 million square feet of completed investment properties and 25.1 million square feet of properties under development.

As of 30 June 2019, the Group held a land bank of 65.4 million square feet in terms of attributable gross floor area on the mainland, including 50.6 million square feet of properties under development and 14.8 million square feet of completed properties.

=== Credit ratings ===
The Group has always attained the highest credit ratings among Hong Kong developers. Moody's gave the Group an A1 rating and Standard & Poor's gave the Group an A+ rating.

== Real estate development projects ==
=== Hong Kong (residential) ===
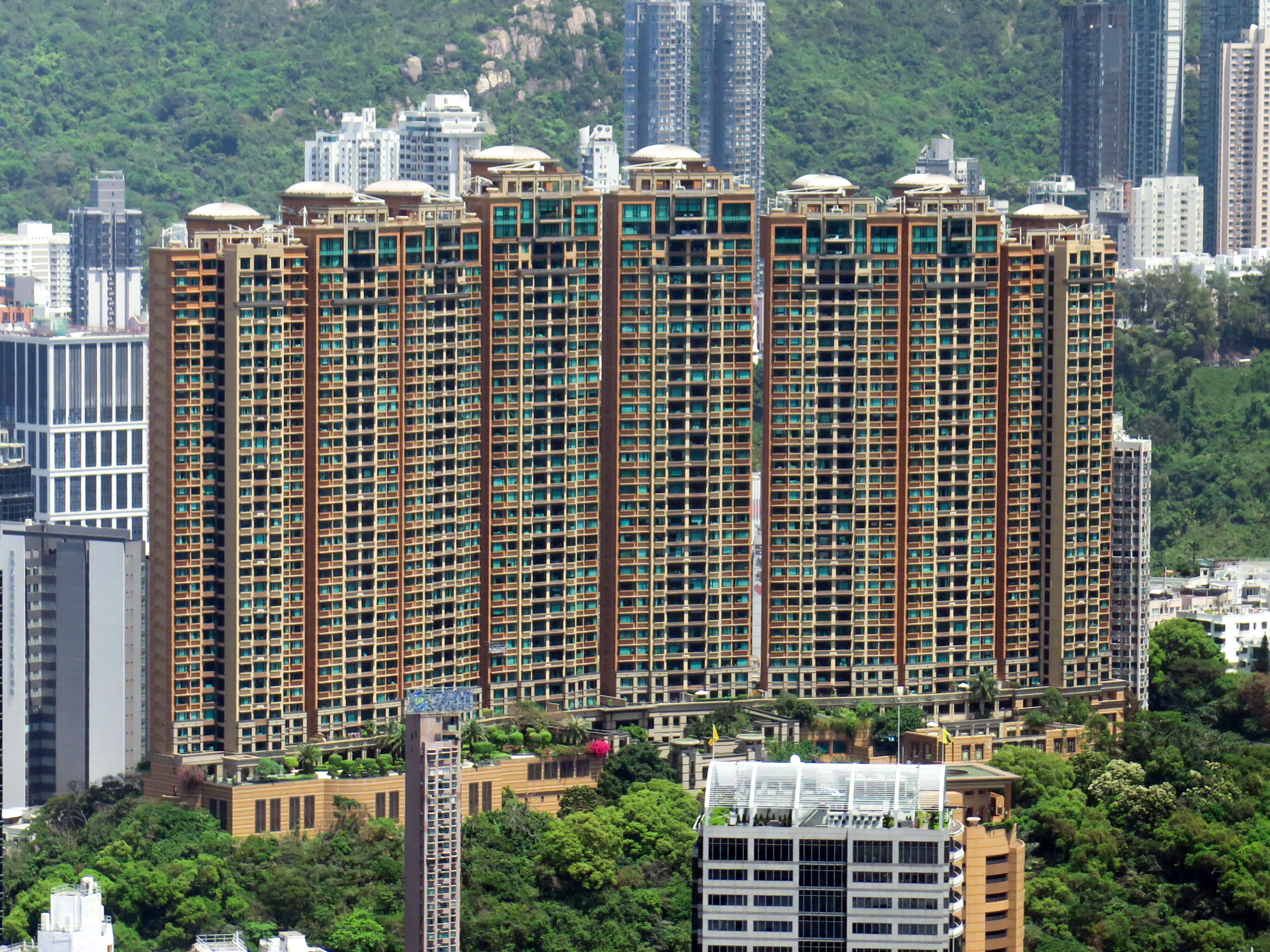
The Leighton Hill

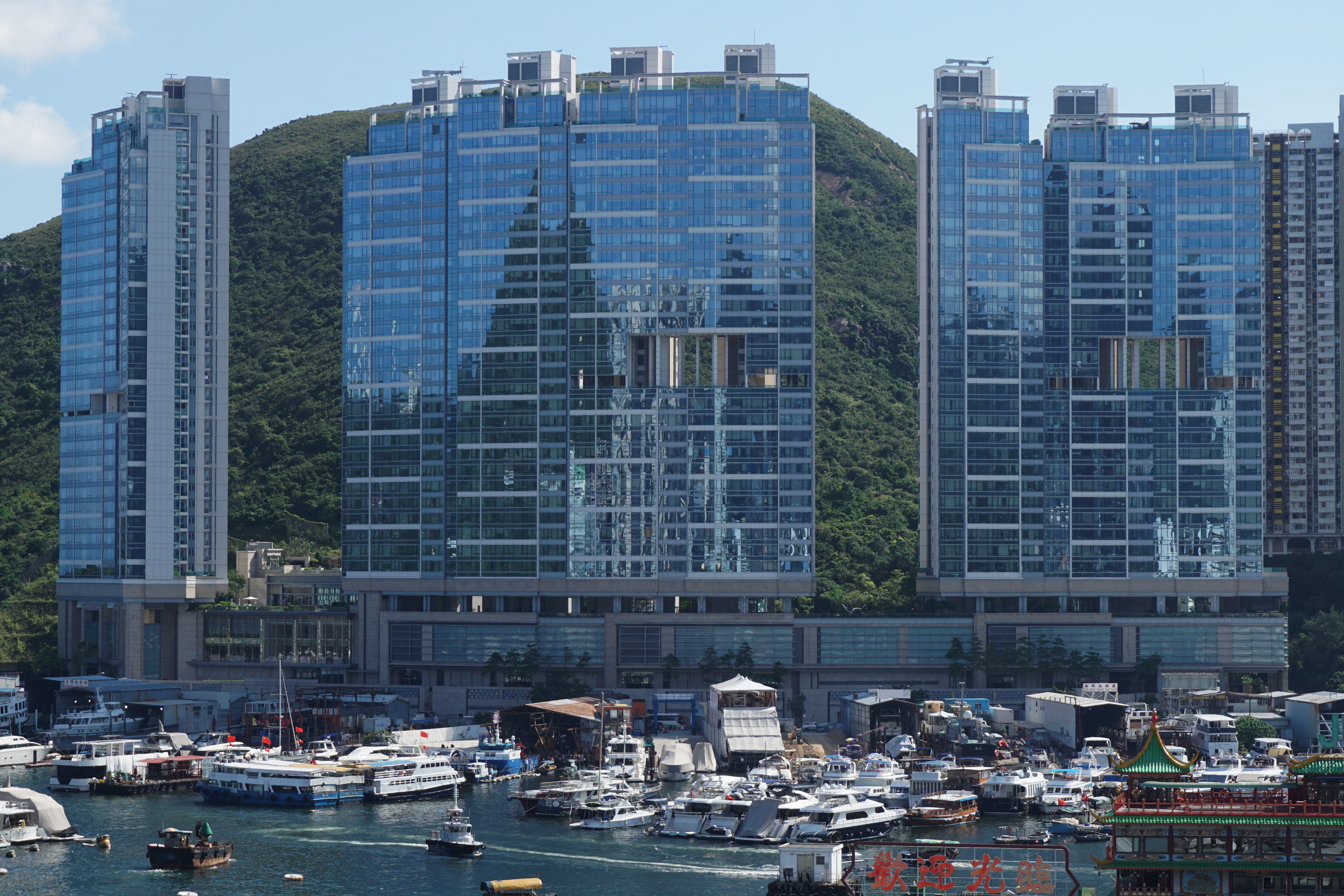
Larvotto

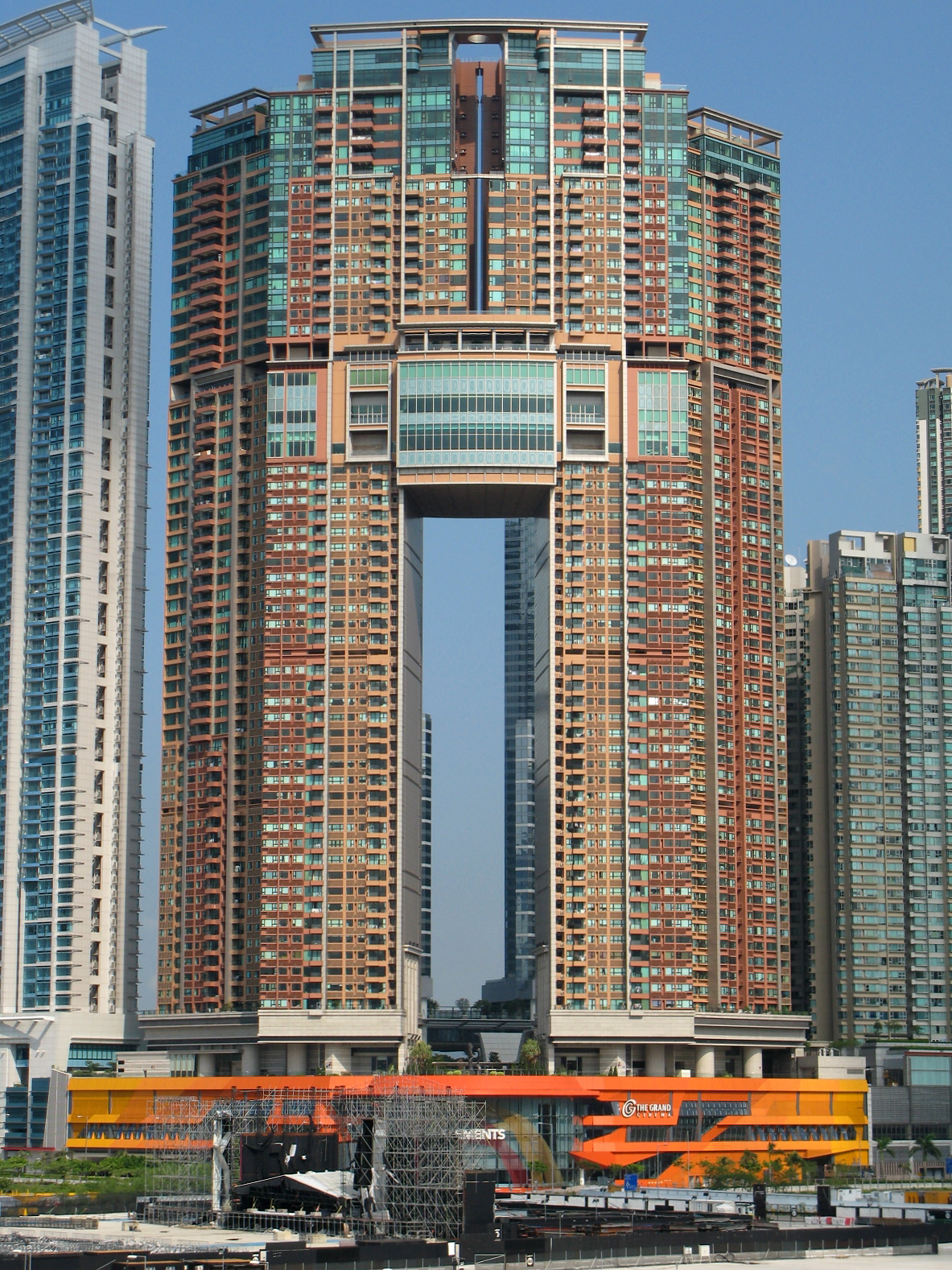
The Arch

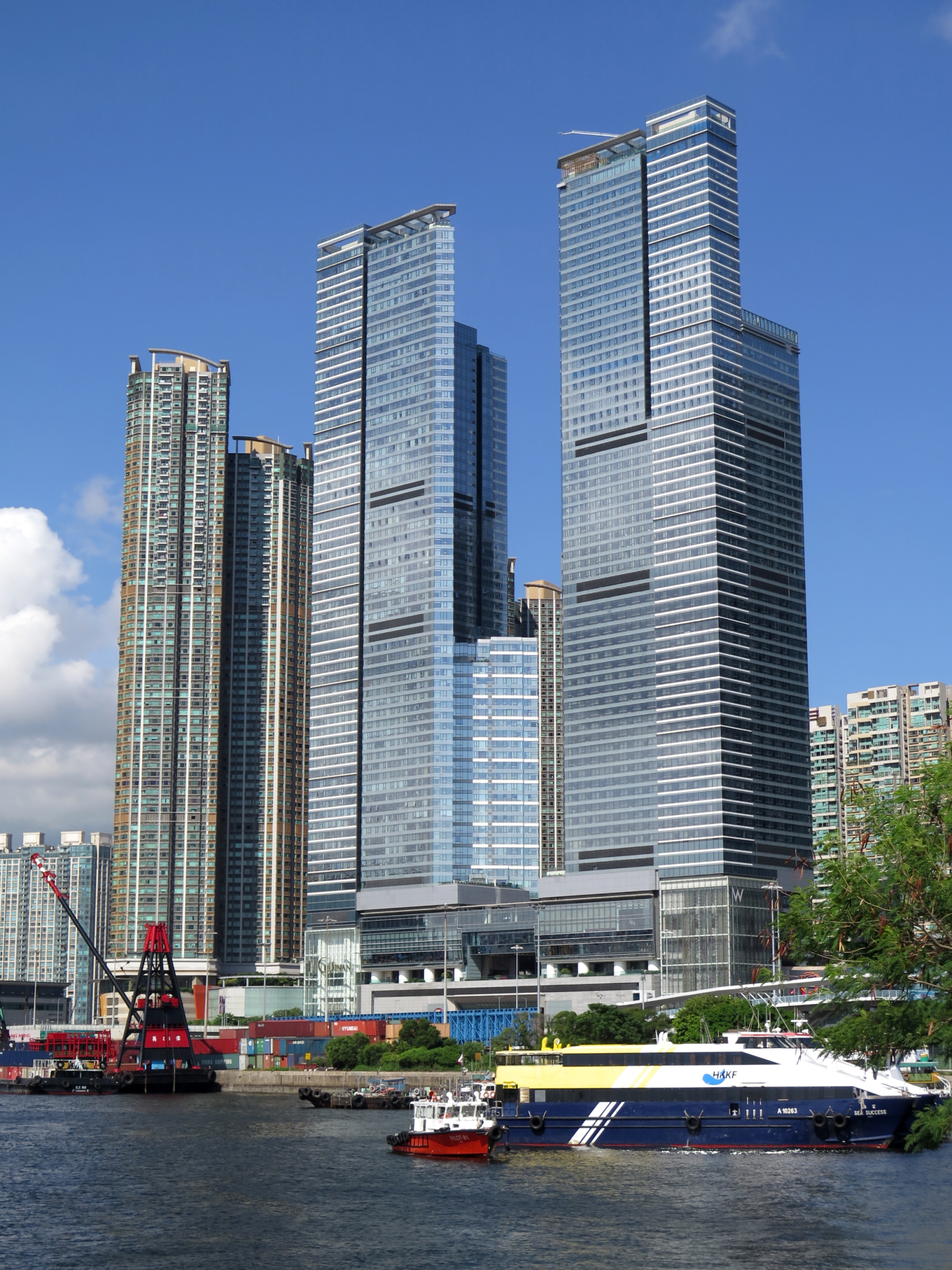
The Cullinan

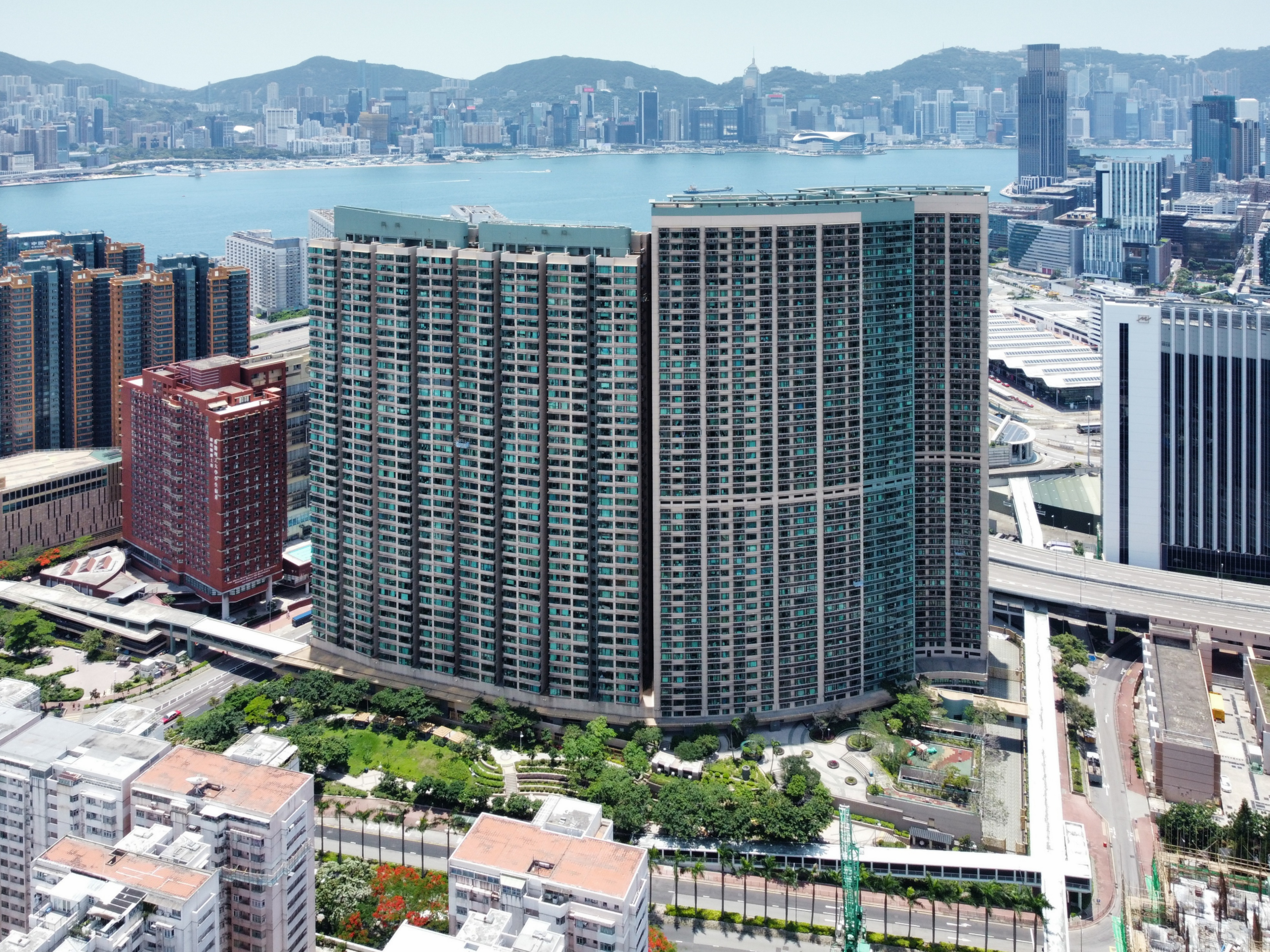
Royal Peninsula

- The Arch
- The Belcher's
- Castello
- Chelsea Court
- City One
- East Point City
- Harbour Green
- Harbour Place
- Larvotto
- The Cullinan
- The Latitude
- The Leighton Hill
- Les Saisons
- Manhattan Hill
- Mayfair Gardens
- Oscar by the Sea
- Park Central
- Park Island
- Pristine Villa
- Royal Ascot
- Royal Peninsula
- Sham Wan Towers
- Villa Esplanada
- Woodland Crest
- YOHO Town

=== Hong Kong (commercial) ===
==== ICC ====
The International Commerce Centre (ICC) in West Kowloon is the tallest building in Hong Kong, standing at 490m with 118 storeys. The development was also chosen as one of the world's top 125 most important works of architecture by Architectural Record in commemoration of the magazine's 125th anniversary.

The tower opened in 2011. While most of the building is leased out as office spaces – ICC provides 2.5 million square feet of office space – the building also houses the Sky100 Hong Kong Observation Deck on the 100th floor as well as restaurants on the 101st floor, with the former providing a 360-degree view over the Victoria Harbour at 393 metres above the sea level. The Ritz-Carlton hotel occupies the building's 102nd to 118th floor. The world's highest swimming pool is located on the top floor as part of the hotel.

The building also has LED lights on its facades for a light show, which has set a Guinness World Record for the "largest light and sound show on a single building". The show occurs twice a night, and can be viewed along both sides of the Victoria Harbour.

The SHKP Vertical Run for Charity has been an annual event hosted by SHKP at ICC since 2012.

==== IFC ====
The International Finance Centre is an integrated commercial development, which includes the currently second tallest building in Hong Kong, only next to ICC. Situated above the Hong Kong MTR station, the project was developed and owned by IFC Development, a consortium with SHKP as one of the members. The IFC project was completed in September 2006, providing a gross floor area of over 4 million square feet in total. It consists of two office towers – One IFC and Two IFC – the Four Seasons Hotel Hong Kong, and the IFC mall. Notable occupants of the development include the Hong Kong Monetary Authority, which purchased 14 floors in Two IFC in 2001.

The ifc mall in the IFC development has 4 floors of luxury retail shops and restaurants. It is also where Hong Kong's first Apple retail store is located.

==== Millennium City ====
Millennium City is a multi-tower development project built along the Kwun Tong Road. By 2016, Phases 1–3, 5 and 6 have been completed.

Millennium City 1, the first to be completed and the largest of the Millennium City cluster, comprises a twin pair of 30-storey towers. The two towers combined provide a total of 1,230,000 square feet of commercial space.

==== New Town Plaza ====
New Town Plaza is an SHKP development located in Sha Tin, Hong Kong. The development project was completed in three phases (Phase 1: 9-storey shopping mall; Phase 2: Royal Park Hotel; Phase 3: private housing and a 3-storey shopping mall). New Town Plaza was the largest development of its kind in New Territories at its time of completion in the 1980s.

Royal Park Hotel is connected to the metro station and New Town Plaza mall via a covered walkway and is close to local attractions such as Che Kung Temple, Sha Tin Racecourse and the Hong Kong Heritage Museum. Royal Park Hotel hosted Olympians competing in equestrian programmes during the Beijing 2008 Summer Olympic Games.

==== apm ====
Opened in March 2005, apm is one of the largest shopping malls targeted at a younger generation of consumers. The name APM is an amalgamation of AM and PM, reflecting how the shops in the mall operate with extended hours, allowing consumers to shop even at hours when most others shops are closed. APM has a lot of retail shops, restaurants and entertainment options, most of the open at least until midnight.

In tune with the theme of being young and trendy, APM houses retail brands that are typically tailored for a younger audience. A cinema, game zone and a karaoke bar are some of the other amenities that visitors can find in the mall.

==== Transitional housing project - United Court ====
SHKP announced that it will lease three plots of land to non-governmental organizations for 8 years for a nominal sum of HK$1. The donation will yield around 2,000 social housing units for low-income families waiting for public housing. The company will team up with the Hong Kong Sheng Kung Hui Welfare Council for the biggest project called United Court. When completed in 2022, United Court would provide homes for 1,600 families and ultimately benefit 5,000 families.

== Other businesses ==
The company also has complimentary operations in the following property-related fields:

- Hotels
- Property management
- Telecommunications
- Information technology
- Infrastructure and other businesses

It was once reported in a local newspaper that the company and Cheung Kong (Holdings) are together increasingly dominant in the development of new private homes, accounting for 70% of the market in 2010, up from around half of that in 2003. This concentration, with much of the rest of the market occupied by other very large firms, is attributed to the government's policy of auctioning land inexpensively large blocks, squeezing out small and mid-sized firms, according to the Consumer Council.

Nevertheless, clarification was later made in the letters to editors column in the same newspaper that Sun Hung Kai Properties' overall share of primary residential sales in terms of attributable value from January to July 2010 has been approximately 20% – a figure that has been largely stable over the last few years.

=== Construction and project management ===
The subsidiary of SHKP, Sanfield (Management) Limited is the major construction project management company for the corporation's real estate development. Established in 1974, the company headquarter is located at Sun Hung Kai Centre. The company mainly provides construction service to SHKP to build private residential buildings, commercial office towers and comprehensive development. In 2020, it had about 3000 employees.

Sanfield provides a wide range of related services to SHKP and third parties, including landscaping, provision of electrical- and fire-prevention systems as well as leasing of construction plant and machinery. Through an associate and its wholly owned subsidiaries, the company also supplies ready-mix concrete and precast concrete components to SHKP and external parties. The company is also an accredited corporation for provide construction safety training and engineering training by Hong Kong Labour Department and The Hong Kong Institution of Engineers.

Its major projects include:

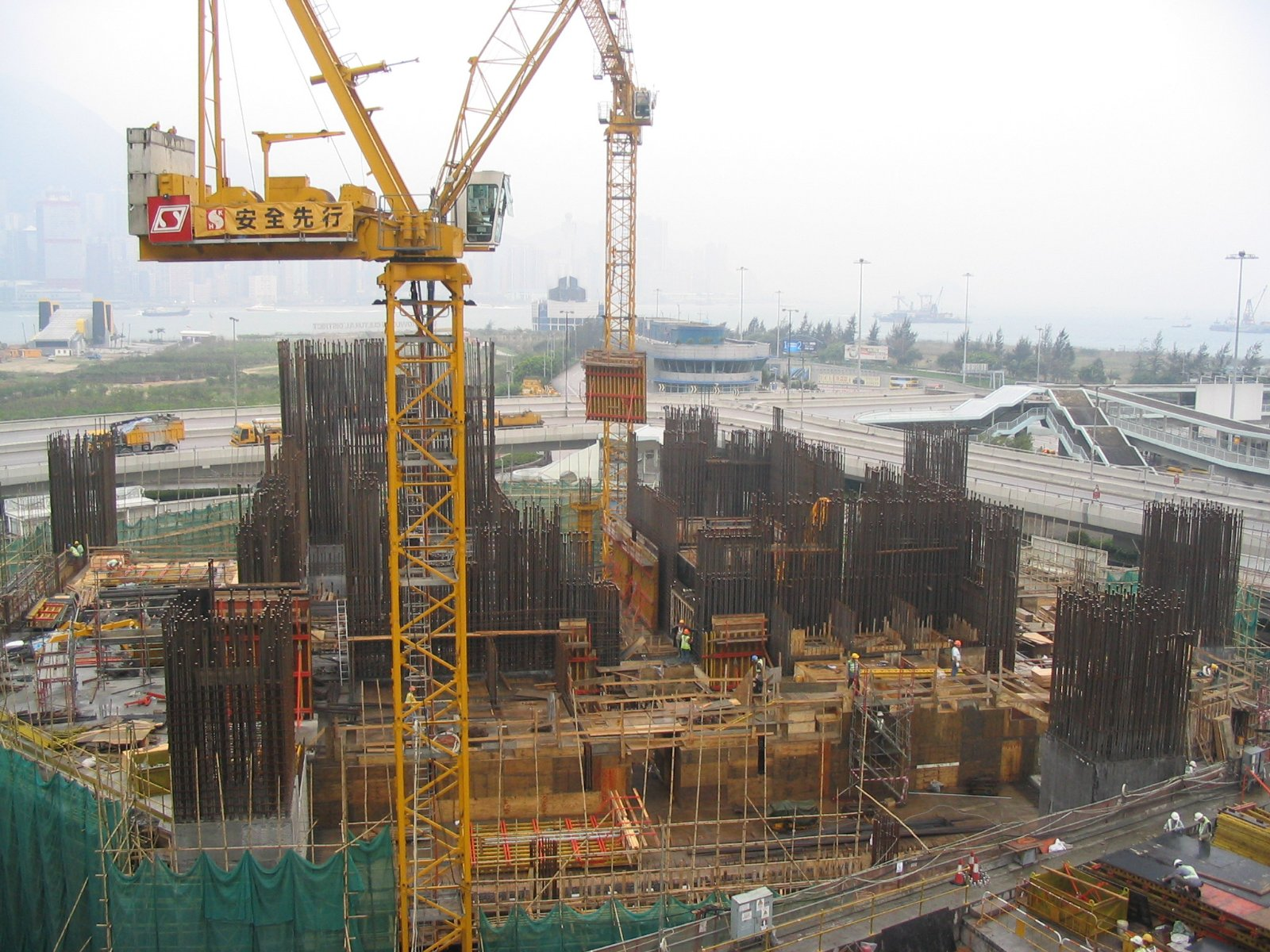
International Commerce Centre under construction in 2005

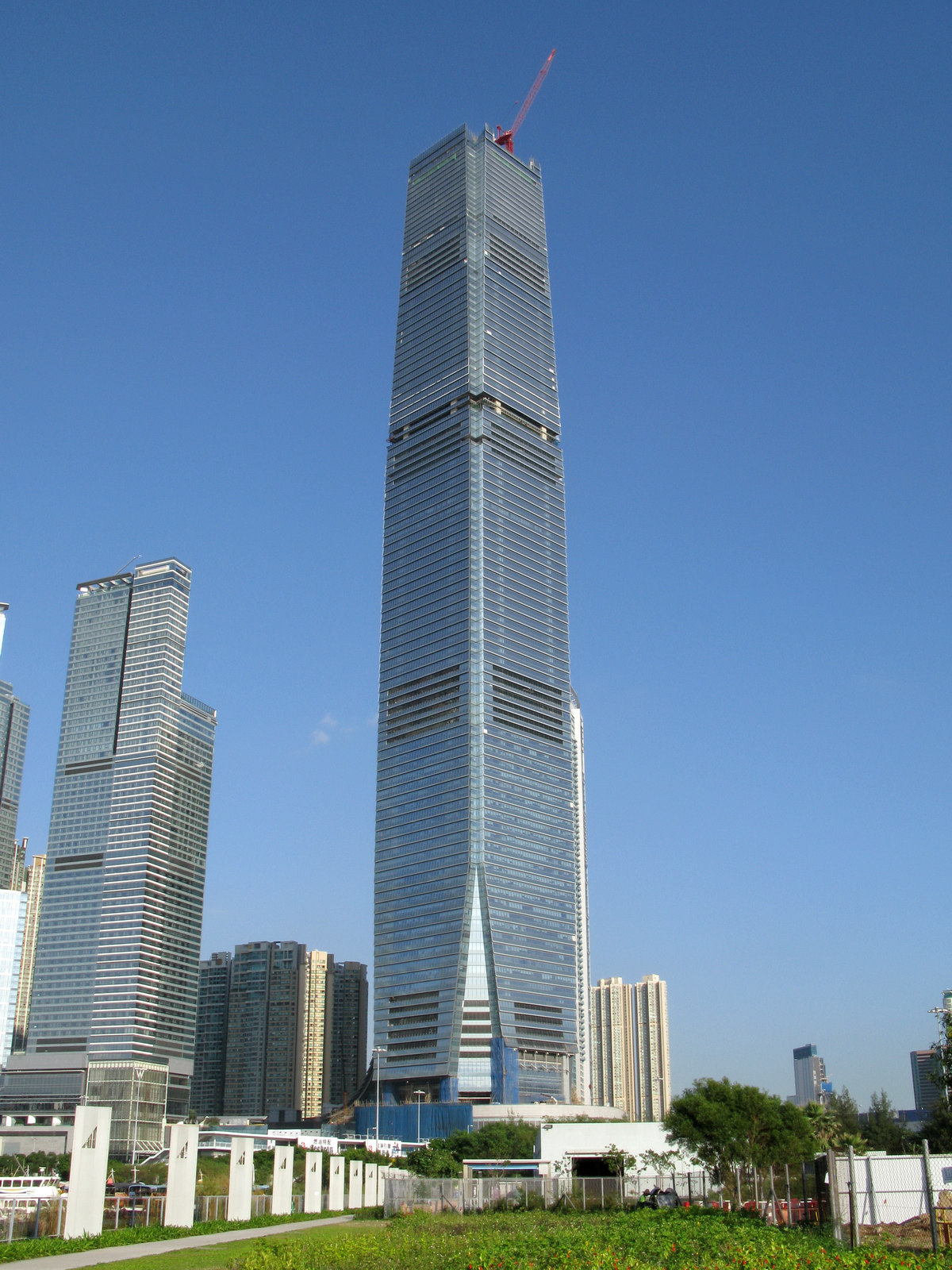
International Commerce Centre, tallest building in Hong Kong since 2010

- Sun Hung Kai Centre (1981)
- Two International Finance Centre (2003)
- The Arch (2006)
- The Cullinan (2009)
- International Commerce Centre (2010)
- Millennium City (1998-2022)
- YOHO Series Development (2004-2023)
- Sai Sha Road Expansion Project (2023)

=== Property management ===
Hong Yip Service Company Limited and Kai Shing Management Services Limited are two of the main property management firms own by SHKP based in Hong Kong.
