= Tsuen Wan station =

MTR station in the New Territories, Hong Kong

Tsuen Wan 荃灣
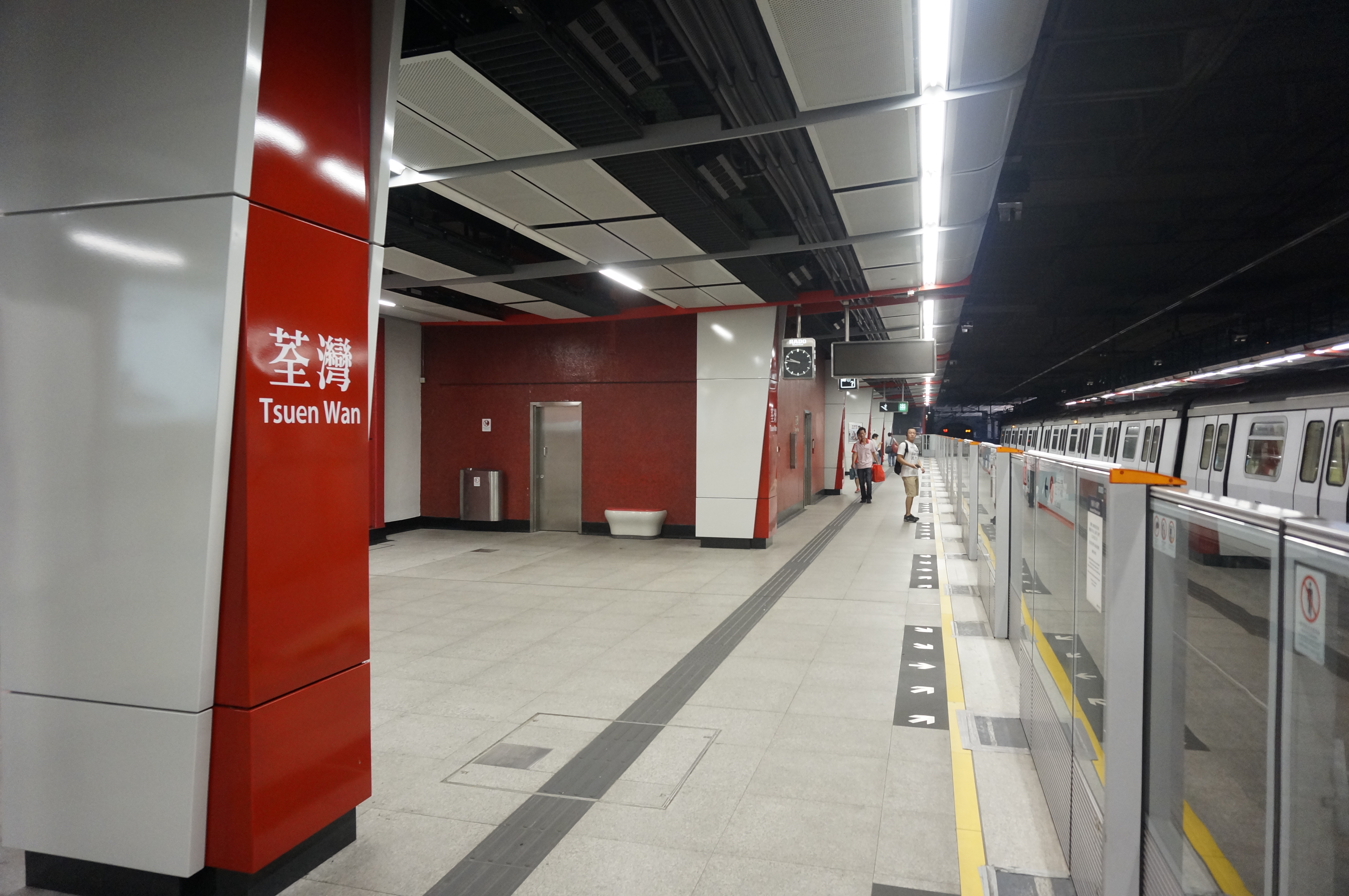
- Platform 2 of Tsuen Wan station

Chinese name
- Traditional Chinese: 荃灣
- Simplified Chinese: 荃湾
- Jyutping: cyun4waan1
- Hanyu Pinyin: Quánwān
- Literal meaning: Bay of fragrant flowers
Transcriptions
Standard Mandarin
- Hanyu Pinyin: Quánwān
Yue: Cantonese
- Yale Romanization: chyùhnwāan
- IPA: [tsʰyn˩wan˥]
- Jyutping: cyun4waan1

General information
- Location: Sai Lau Kok Road × Tai Ho Road, Tsuen Wan; Tsuen Wan District, Hong Kong
- Coordinates: 22°22′25″N 114°07′04″E
- System: MTR rapid transit station
- Owner: MTR Corporation
- Operator: MTR Corporation
- Line: Tsuen Wan line
- Platforms: 2 side platforms
- Tracks: 2
- Connections: Bus, minibus

Construction
- Structure type: At-grade
- Platform levels: 1
- Accessible: yes

Other information
- Station code: TSW

History
- Opened: 17 May 1982; 44 years ago

Services
| Preceding station | MTR | Following station |
|---|---|---|
| Tai Wo Hau towards Central | Tsuen Wan line | Terminus |
Track layout
Location
- Location within MTR

Tsuen Wan (Chinese: 荃灣; Cantonese Yale: chyùhnwāan) is an MTR station on the Tsuen Wan line. It is the only station on the Tsuen Wan line at ground level. It is located in the northern central part of Tsuen Wan New Town, New Territories West. The preceding station is Tai Wo Hau. Its livery is dark red.

== History ==
The station opened as part of the line opening on 10 May 1982. A commemorative plaque in the station concourse, near exit A, was unveiled by Acting Governor Sir Philip Haddon-Cave. The station was designed as an intermediate station with two side platforms, with trains terminating at Tsuen Wan West, further northwest near Tsuen King Garden, different from the present Tuen Ma line Tsuen Wan West station. It was built by Dragages, along with the line's depot.

The area around the proposed terminus had a poor development record and it was decided to not build a station there, causing the station to use different platforms for loading and unloading. After leaving the unloading platform, trains enter the section of track beyond the station to proceed to the Tsuen Wan Depot or reverse back to the loading platform to head towards Central.

During the construction of the station, Route Twisk was diverted. The Sam Tung Uk walled village was also relocated, though it was later preserved as a museum.

New roads and shopping centres were set up around the station, and a private housing estate was built directly above the station. A bus interchange was set up under one of the shopping centres.

== Usage ==
The usage of the station was low when it opened in 1982, as the station was located in the northern edge of Tsuen Wan town, with the connecting infrastructure being incomplete, making it difficult to attract residents in the town centre to take the use the station.

After 20 years of development, the area around the station gradually took over as the town centre. Several shopping malls were constructed near the station, and an extensive footbridge network was built to connect to nearby shopping malls, the original town centre, and some villages to the north.

The station also acts as an important transportation interchange, with numerous bus and minibus routes serving near the station. Commuters from northwest New Territories used to change buses at this station to continue their journey into Kowloon by MTR, before the West Rail line opened in 2003.

== Refurbishment ==
The station was refurbished twice. In the early 1990s, a Chinese-style design was introduced inside the station. This design was removed after the second refurbishment in 2004, where more shops were set up in the station (a common practice of MTR station refurbishments in the 2000s). Gates were relocated to handle more passengers.

== Station layout ==
Platforms 1 and 2 are both located at ground level, and the tracks are located right next to each other. One platform is used for boarding and the other is used for alighting. Two new exits have been built next to Platform 1, allowing passengers to leave the station without going up the escalators and coming back down again. Passengers entering the station via these exits will have to take an escalator up to the concourse, cross to the other side for the down escalator for Platform 2.

| - | Shopping Mall; Residential Area/ Flyover | Tsuen Wan Centre, Luk Yeung Sun Chuen, Luk Yeung Galleria (last two on opposite side); Tai Ho Road North |
| U1 | Concourse | Exits A-C, customer service, MTRshops |
| U1 | Concourse | Hang Seng Bank, vending machines, automatic teller machines |
| U1 | Concourse | Octopus promotion machine |
| G Platforms | Depot | MTR Tsuen Wan Depot |
| G Platforms | Side platform, doors will open on the left |
| G Platforms | Platform 2 | Tsuen Wan line towards Central (Tai Wo Hau) → |
| G Platforms | Platform 1 | ← Tsuen Wan line termination platform |
| G Platforms | Side platform, doors will open on the left |
| G Platforms | Exits | Exit D, E, Public light bus stops |

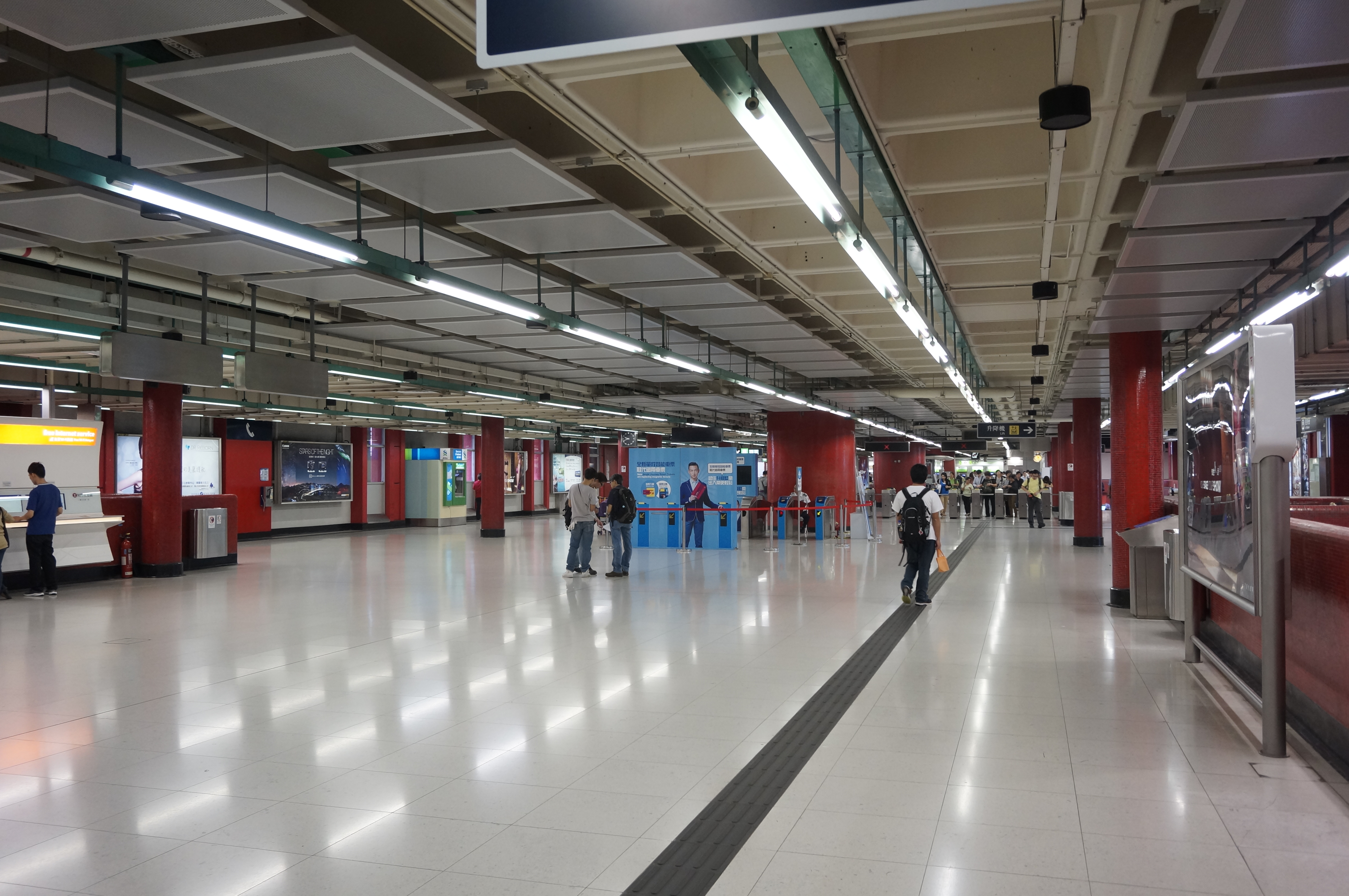
Concourse of Tsuen Wan station

== Entrances and exits ==
Concourse (U1)

- A1: New Town Mall
- A2: Bus Terminus
- A3: Government Offices, Discovery Park
- A4: Bus Stop
- B1: Fou Wah Centre
- B2: Kolour Tsuen Wan, Panda Hotel
- B3: Sai Lau Kok Road
- C: Luk Yeung Sun Chuen

Platform 1 (G)

- D: Green Minibus Stop
- E: Sam Tung Uk Museum

Sai Lau Kok Road – Exit A4 / D
| Route | Termini | |
|---|---|---|
| 95A | Summit Terrace | **Tsuen Wan Station** ↺ |
| 95M | Tsuen Wan Station (Terminates at Sai Lau Kok PTI, see above) | Tsuen Wan Centre |
| 95K | **Tsuen Wan Station** | Tsuen Wan West Station |
| 96A | Yau Kom Tau Village | **Tsuen Wan Station** ↺ |
| 96B | Belvedere Garden | **Tsuen Wan Station** ↺ |
| 96C | **Tsuen Wan Station** | Bellagio |
| 96M | Tsuen Wan Station (Terminates at Sai Lau Kok PTI, see above) | Tsing Lung Tau |
| 301 | Clague Garden Estate | **Tsuen Wan Station** ↺ |
| 301M | Tsuen Wan West Station | **Tsuen Wan Station** ↺ |

- → : One-way operation
- ↺ : Circular operation
- bold: Tsuen Wan Station as terminus of route

== See also ==
- Footbridge Network in Tsuen Wan
