= Tsuen Wan Centre (constituency) =

- Elected constituency for the Tsuen Wan District Council
- Boundary of Tsuen Wan Centre in Tsuen Wan District
- District: Tsuen Wan
- Legislative Council constituency: New Territories South West
- Population: 14,883 (2019)
- Electorate: 8,765 (2019)

Current constituency
- Created: 1999
- Number of members: One
- Member: Vacant

Tsuen Wan Centre is one of the 17 constituencies in the Tsuen Wan District. The constituency returns one district councillor to the Tsuen Wan District Council, with an election every four years.

Tsuen Wan Centre constituency is loosely based on the Tsuen Wan Centre, Kam Fung Garden and part of Tsuen Tak Gardens in Tsuen Wan with estimated population of 14,883.

== Councillors represented ==
Election	Member	Party
1999	Li Hung-por	Independent
2007	Cheung Ho-ming	DAB
2011	Li Hung-por→Vacant	Democratic

== Election results ==
=== 2010s ===
Tsuen Wan District Council Election, 2019: Tsuen Wan Centre
Party	Candidate	Votes	%	±%
Democratic	Li Hung-por	3,887	61.06	+9.19
DAB (FTU)	Tsang Tai	2,479	38.94	−9.19
Majority		1,408	2.12	
Turnout		6,398	73.00	
Democratic hold		Swing		

Tsuen Wan District Council Election, 2015: Tsuen Wan Centre
Party	Candidate	Votes	%	±%
Democratic	Li Hung-por	2,235	51.87	+1.26
DAB	Tsang Tai	2,074	48.13	−1.26
Majority		161	3.74	
Turnout		4,309	54.50	
Democratic hold		Swing	+1.26	

Tsuen Wan District Council Election, 2011: Tsuen Wan Centre
Party	Candidate	Votes	%	±%
Democratic	Li Hung-por	1,657	50.61	+2.22
DAB	Tsang Tai	1,617	49.39	−1.15
Majority		40	1.22	
Turnout		3,274	42.97	
Democratic gain from DAB		Swing	+1.69	

=== 2000s ===
Tsuen Wan District Council Election, 2007: Tsuen Wan Centre
Party	Candidate	Votes	%	±%
DAB	Cheung Ho-ming	1,085	50.54	+9.02
Independent	Li Hung-por	1,039	48.39	−10.09
Independent	Leung Ho-wah	23	1.07	
Majority		45	2.15	
DAB gain from Independent		Swing	+9.56	

Tsuen Wan District Council Election, 2003: Tsuen Wan Centre
Party	Candidate	Votes	%	±%
Independent	Li Hung-por	1,345	58.48	+8.83
DAB	Lui Tak-hung	955	41.52	+25.90
Majority		390	16.96	
Independent hold		Swing		

=== 1990s ===
Tsuen Wan District Council Election, 1999: Tsuen Wan Centre
Party	Candidate	Votes	%	±%
Independent	Li Hung-por	642	49.65	
Independent	Kong Yat-pui	449	34.73	
DAB	Lui Tak-hung	202	15.62	
Majority		193	14.92	
Independent win (new seat)				
