= Tsuen King Circuit =

Area and road in New Territories, Hong Kong

Tsuen King Circuit (Chinese: 荃景圍) is an area and a road in Tsuen Wan, New Territories, Hong Kong. It is located on a hill in the northwest of the Chai Wan Kok Industrial Area, so it was also called "West Chai Wan Kok". There are mainly private housing estates in this area.

== Private housing estates ==
- Allway Gardens
- Tsuen Wan Centre
- Tsuen King Garden
- Joyful Building
- Sheeny Terrace
- Tsuen Tak Gardens
- Kam Fung Terrace
- Discovery Park
- Summit Terrace

== Facilities ==
- Hong Kong Adventist Hospital – Tsuen Wan
- Church Of The Annunciation
- Wu Chung Public Swimming Pool
- Tsuen King Circuit Sports Centre
