= The Cliveden =

Private housing estate in Tsuen Wan, Hong Kong

Coordinates: 22.38422°N 114.10917°E

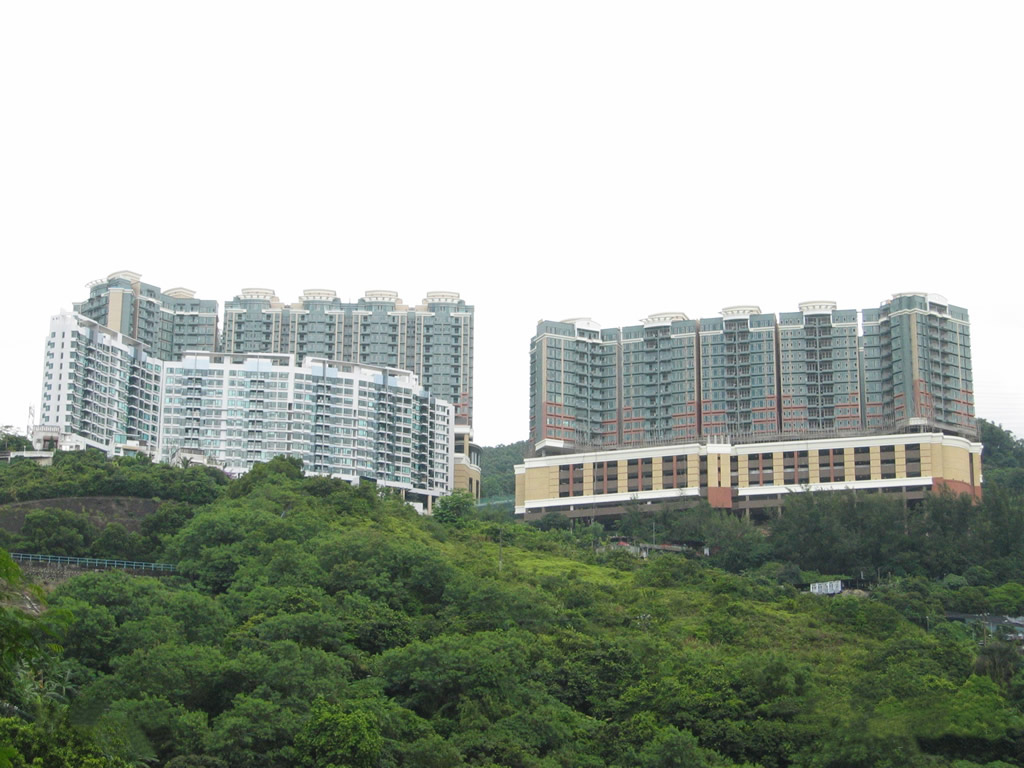
The Cliveden (left and front)

The Cliveden (Chinese: 寶雲匯) is a private housing estate in mid-level of Route Twisk, Tsuen Wan, New Territories, Hong Kong, next to The Cairnhill. It is a low-density European-style luxury residential development project in the mid-levels of Tsuen Wan District, with a total of 9 residential buildings (there is no 4th block). It was jointly developed by Kerry Properties and Sino Land in 2002. It comprises 9 residential towers of 10 storeys with a total of 210 units.

== Transportation ==
- Resident's bus service route: NR335 (The Cliveden to Tsuen Wan MTR station)
- KMB: Route 51
- Minibus: Route 80

== See also ==
- The Cairnhill
