= The Cairnhill =

Private housing estate in Tsuen Wan, New Territories, Hong Kong

Coordinates: 22.38511°N 114.10935°E

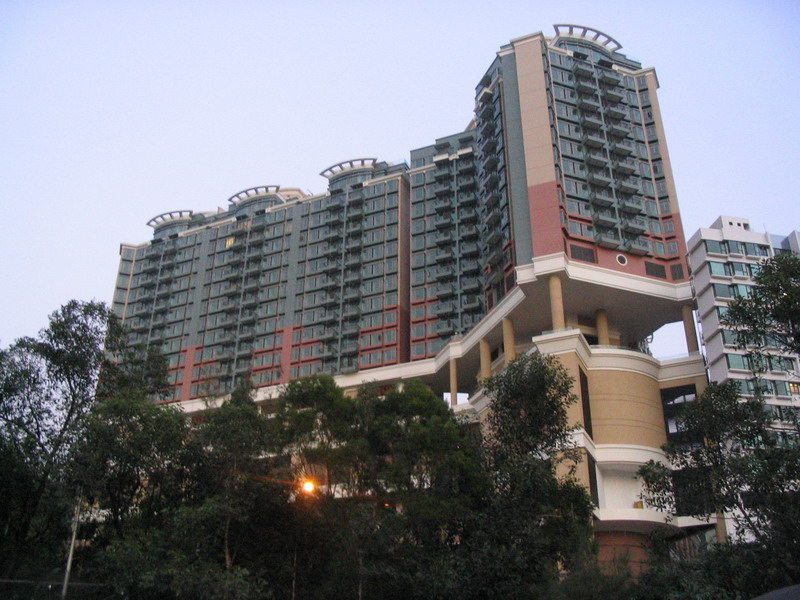
The Cairnhill Phase 1

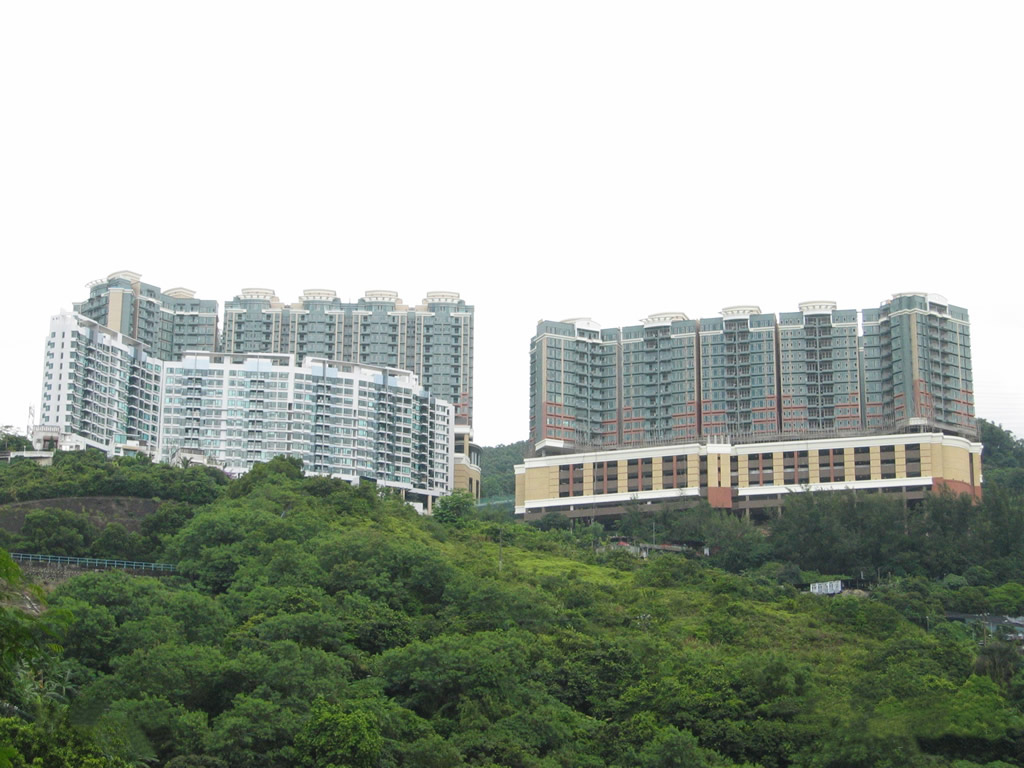
The Cairnhill (left back and right)

The Cairnhill (Chinese: 朗逸峯) is a private housing estate in Tsuen Wan, New Territories, Hong Kong. Being one of the estates built on many d level of the hill of Route Twisk (Another one is The Cliveden), it consists of 16 low-density blocks divided into 2 phases and completed in 2004 and 2005 respectively, offering a total of 770 units. It was jointly developed by Cheung Kong Holdings, Sino Land and K. Wah International.

== Transportation ==
- Resident's bus service route: NR333 (The Cairnhill to Tsuen Wan MTR station)
- KMB: Route 51
- Minibus: Route 80

== See also ==
- The Cliveden
