= Chai Wan Kok =

Area in Tsuen Wan, Hong Kong

Chai Wan Kok 柴灣角
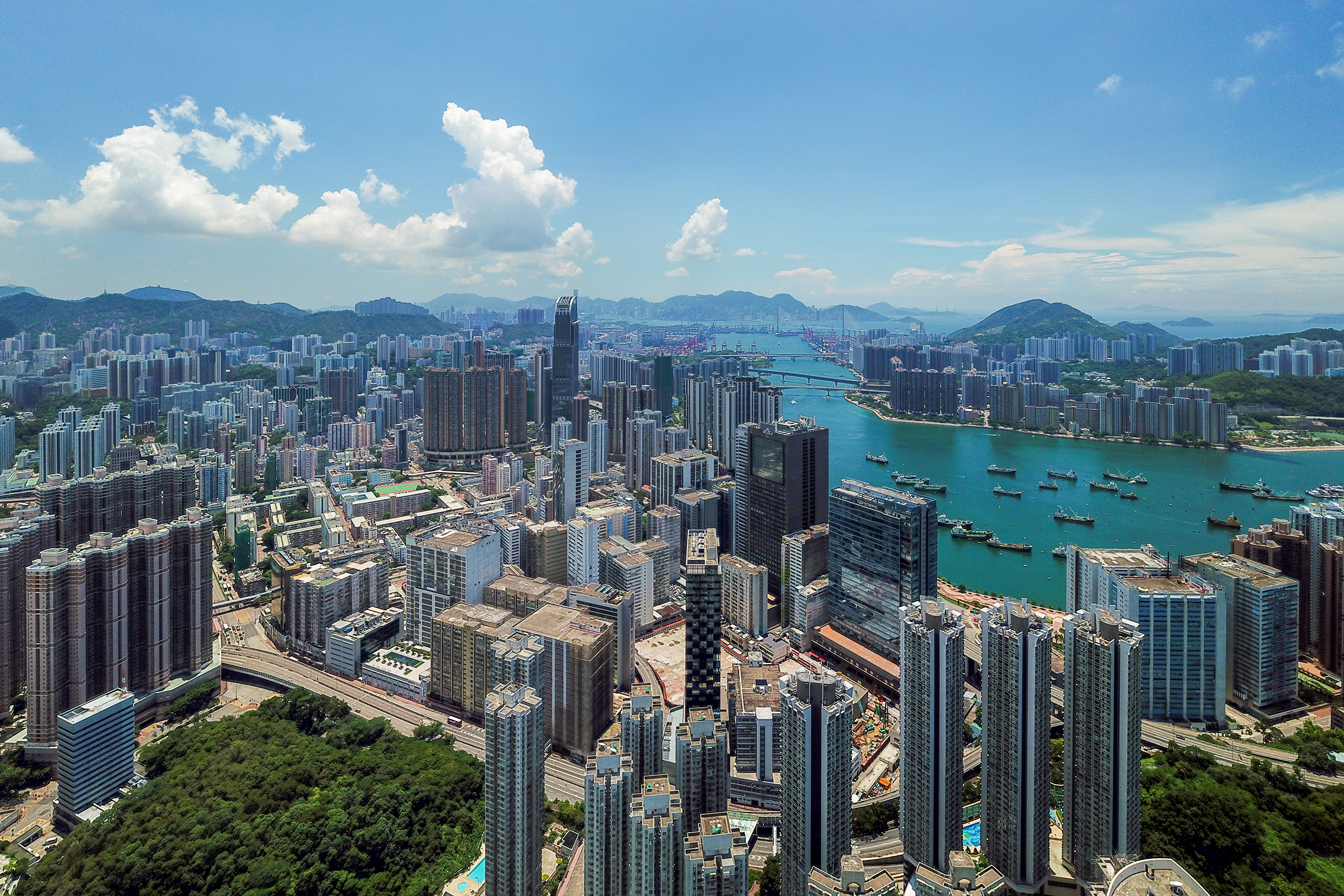
- Chai Wan Kok
- Interactive map of Chai Wan Kok
- Country: China
- Special Administrative Region: Hong Kong
- Town: Tsuen Wan

Chai Wan Kok
- Traditional Chinese: 柴灣角
- Simplified Chinese: 柴湾角
Transcriptions
Standard Mandarin
- Hanyu Pinyin: Chái Wān Jiǎo
Hakka
- Romanization: Cai2 Van1 Gok5
Yue: Cantonese
- Jyutping: Cai4 Wan1 Gok9

Chai Wan Kok (Chinese: 柴灣角) is an area in Tsuen Wan, Hong Kong. It is located at the west end of Tsuen Wan Town. While its southeast is industrial area, its hilly northeast and coastal southwest are residential. It is on the main access between Tuen Mun and Tsuen Wan.

According to the book Hong Kong monuments (Chinese: 香港文物), published in 1991 by the Hong Kong regional council, there were antiques traced back to around five thousand years, there were also antiques traced back to the Western Han dynasty and Eastern Han dynasty.

== Industry ==
Between southeast seafront and Castle Peak Road are the industrial area, the major textile factories had chosen the area for their business. As the economy of Hong Kong shifting to tertiary industry, some factory building are transformed into offices. The headquarters of I-CABLE, a major cable TV and internet service provider in Hong Kong, is sited in the area.

Due to the industries along the waterfront, there is a high amount of copper pollution among the species living in the region.

== Residential ==
The hilly northeast sited some early Hong Kong private housing estate like Allway Gardens and Tsuen King Garden.

The southwest coast is also residential and major private housing estate includes Belvedere Garden.

== Transport ==
Historically Yuen Tsuen Ancient Trail, a hilly path connecting Tsuen Wan and Yuen Long, was once a major access between two areas. The trail remains good for hiking and Chai Wan Kok is the start on the Tsuen Wan end.

The area is the transportation crossroads of several major roads connecting Tsuen Wan and Tuen Mun. Tuen Mun Road, Castle Peak Road and Tsuen Wan Road joins in the area.

The former location of Tsuen Wan Pier is now the Tsuen Wan West station on the Tuen Ma line, the MTR station closest to the Chai Wan Kok area.

== Education ==
Chai Wan Kok is in Primary One Admission (POA) School Net 62, which includes schools in Tsuen Wan and areas nearby. The net includes multiple aided schools and one government school, Hoi Pa Street Government Primary School.

== See also ==
- Chai Wan (an area on Hong Kong Island which is easily confused with Chai Wan Kok)
- The Mills, Hong Kong
- Tsuen Wan New Town
