= Tsuen Wan =

Tsuen Wan 荃灣
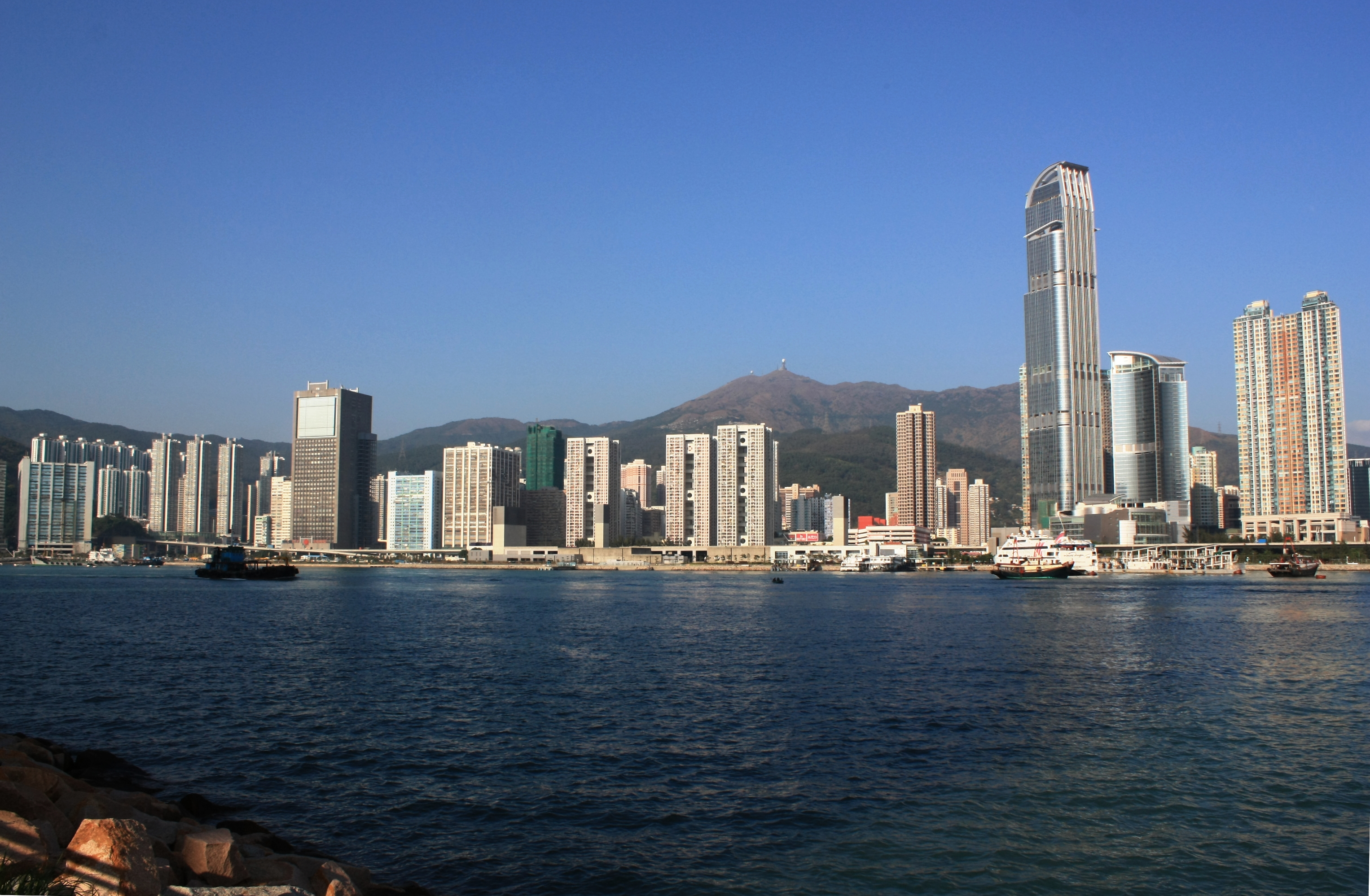
- The day scene of Tsuen Wan across Rambler Channel (View taken from Tsing Yi Island)
- Interactive map of Tsuen Wan
- Coordinates: 22°22′07″N 114°06′47″E
- Country: Hong Kong
- Region: New Territories
- District: Tsuen Wan District

Area
  - Total: 60.7 km^{2} (23.4 sq mi)

Population (2006)
  - Total: 288,728
  - Density: 4,760/km^{2} (12,300/sq mi)

Tsuen Wan
- Traditional Chinese: 荃灣
- Simplified Chinese: 荃湾
Transcriptions
Standard Mandarin
- Hanyu Pinyin: Quánwān
Hakka
- Romanization: Cien4 van1
Yue: Cantonese
- Yale Romanization: Chyùhn wāan
- Jyutping: Cyun4 waan1

Tsuen Wan (formerly also spelled Tsun Wan) is a town built on a bay in the western New Territories of Hong Kong, opposite Tsing Yi Island across Rambler Channel. The market town of Tsuen Wan emerged from the surrounding villages and fleets of fishing boats in the area. The modern city is centred around Tsuen Wan station of the MTR. Its coastline was further extended through land reclamation.

== History ==
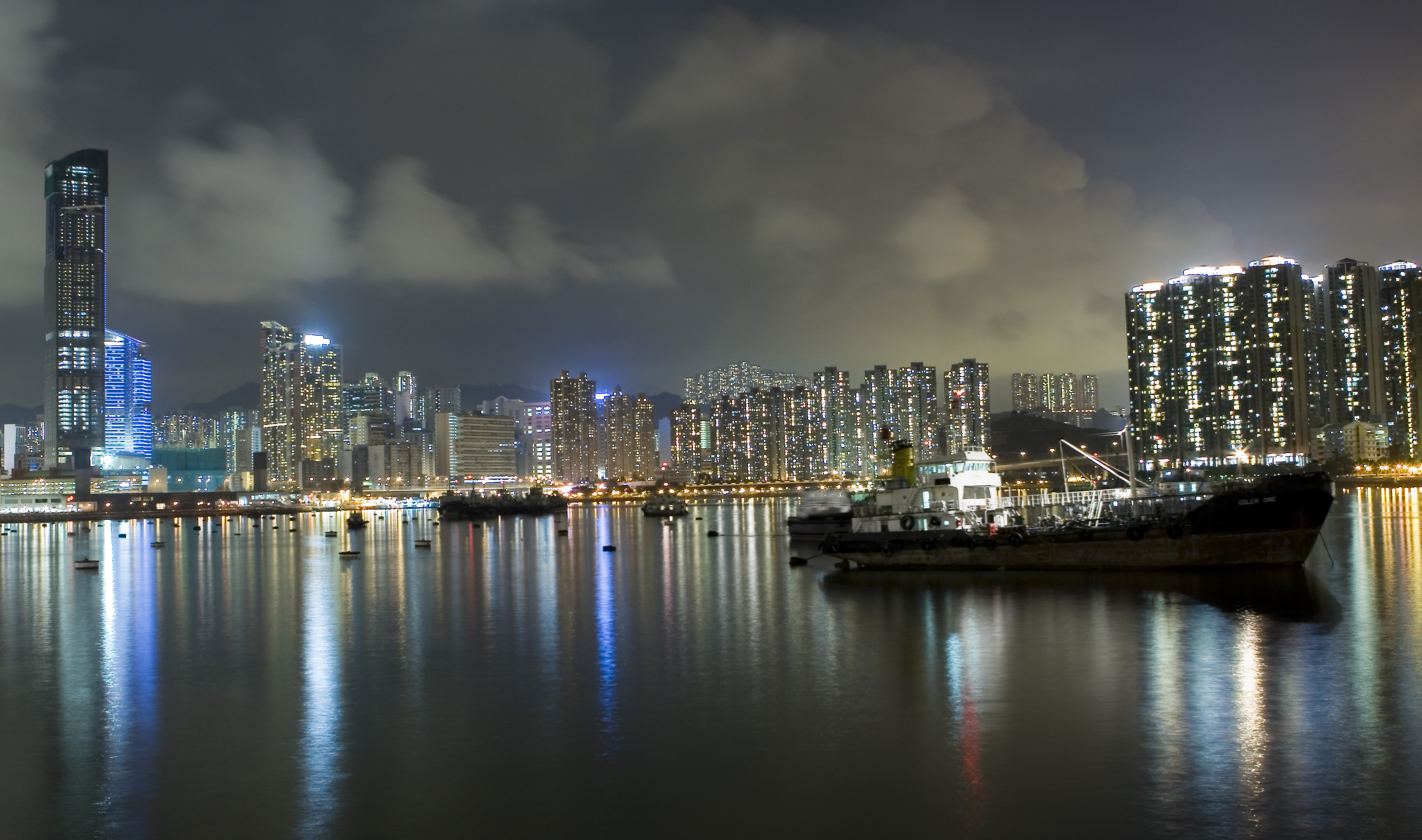
Night scene of Tsuen Wan taken near Belvedere Gardens Estate. To the left is Nina Tower

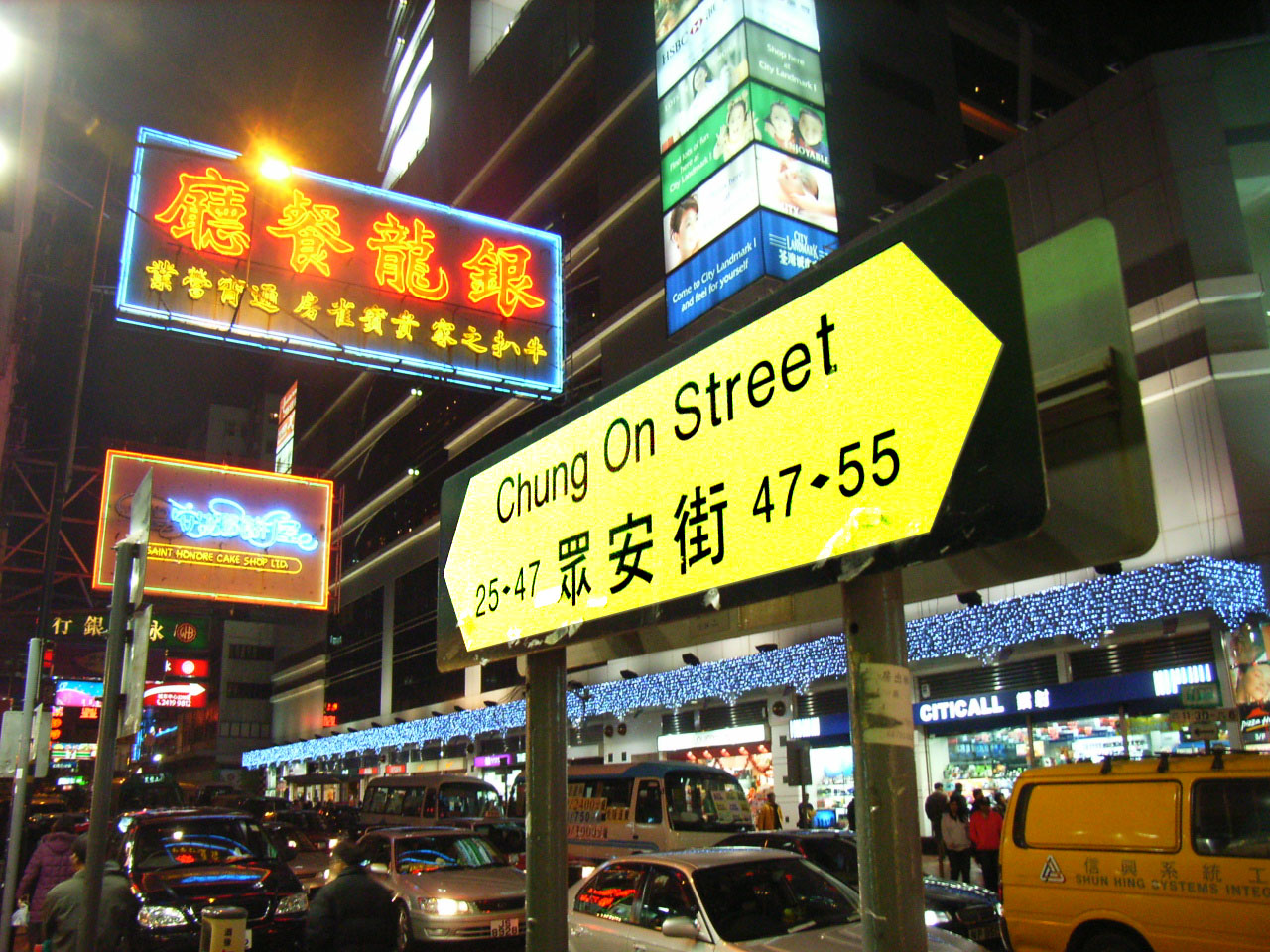
Commercial area in Chung On Street, Tsuen Wan

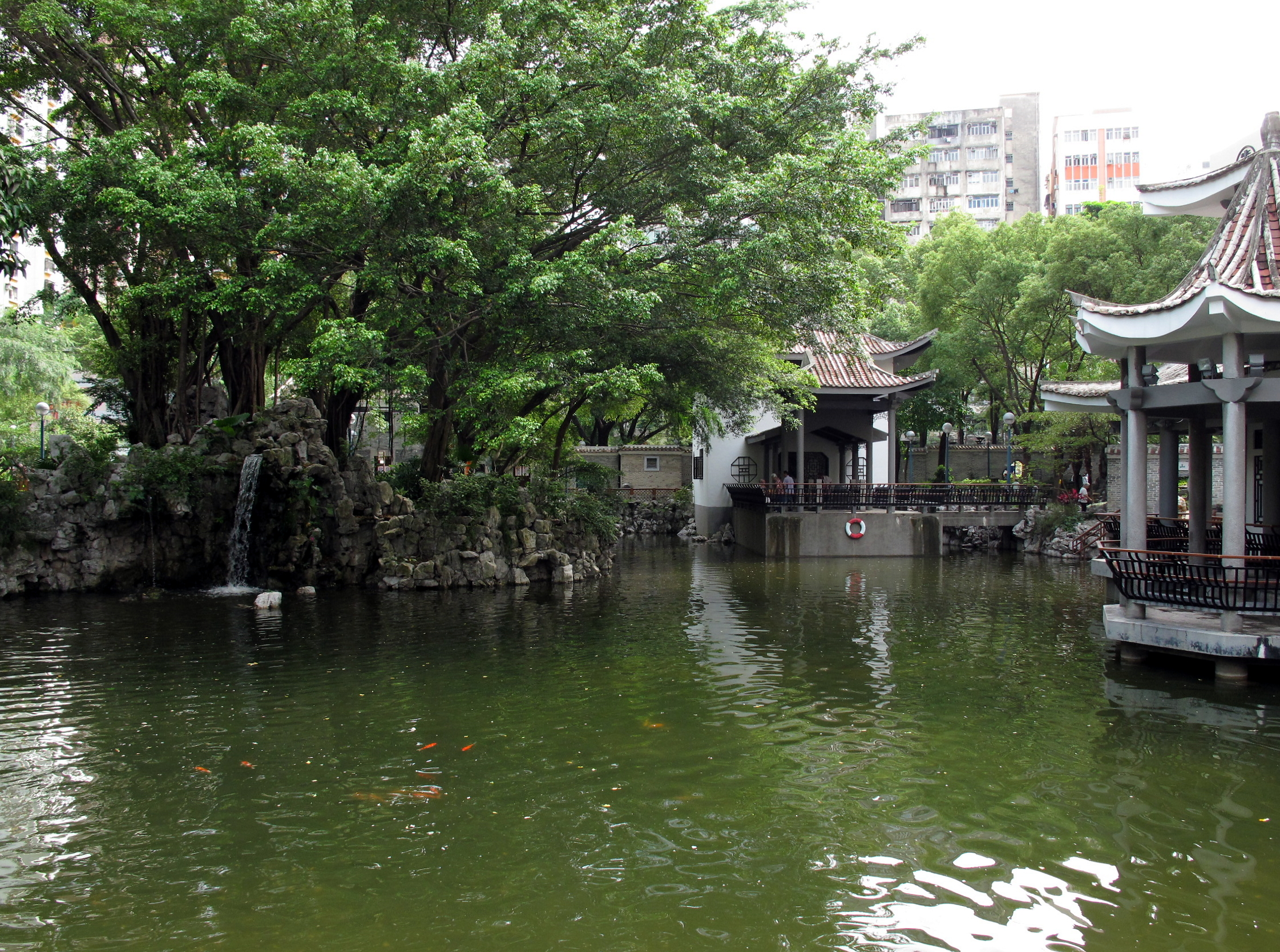
Jockey Club Tak Wah Park

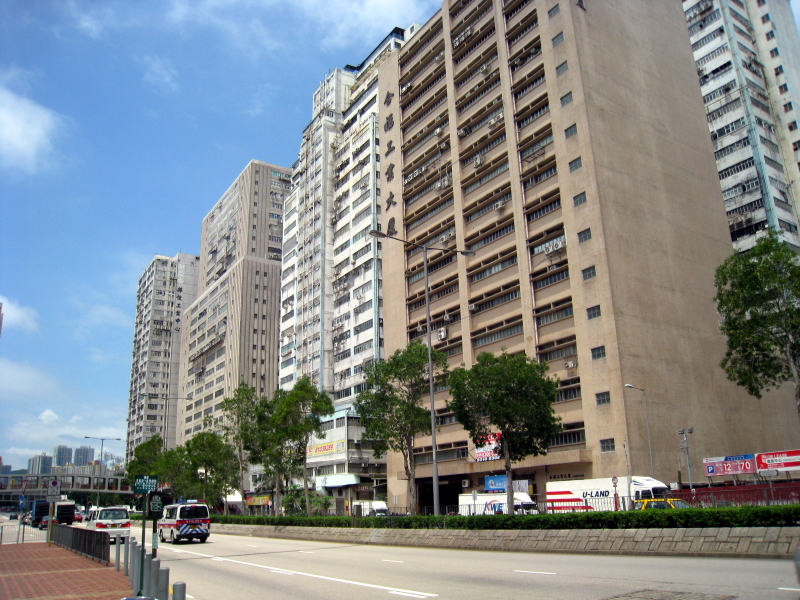
Chai Wan Kok

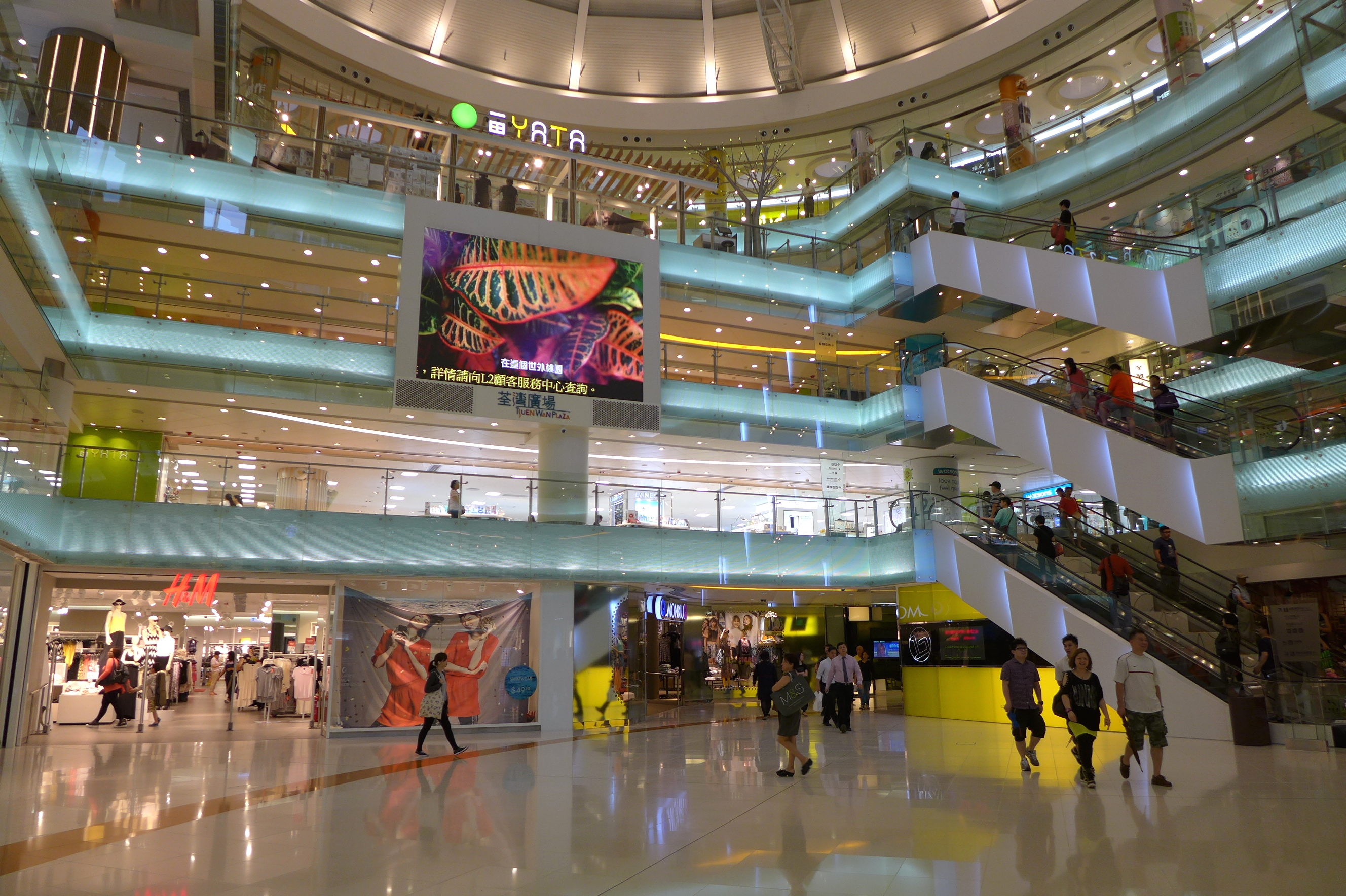
Tsuen Wan Plaza

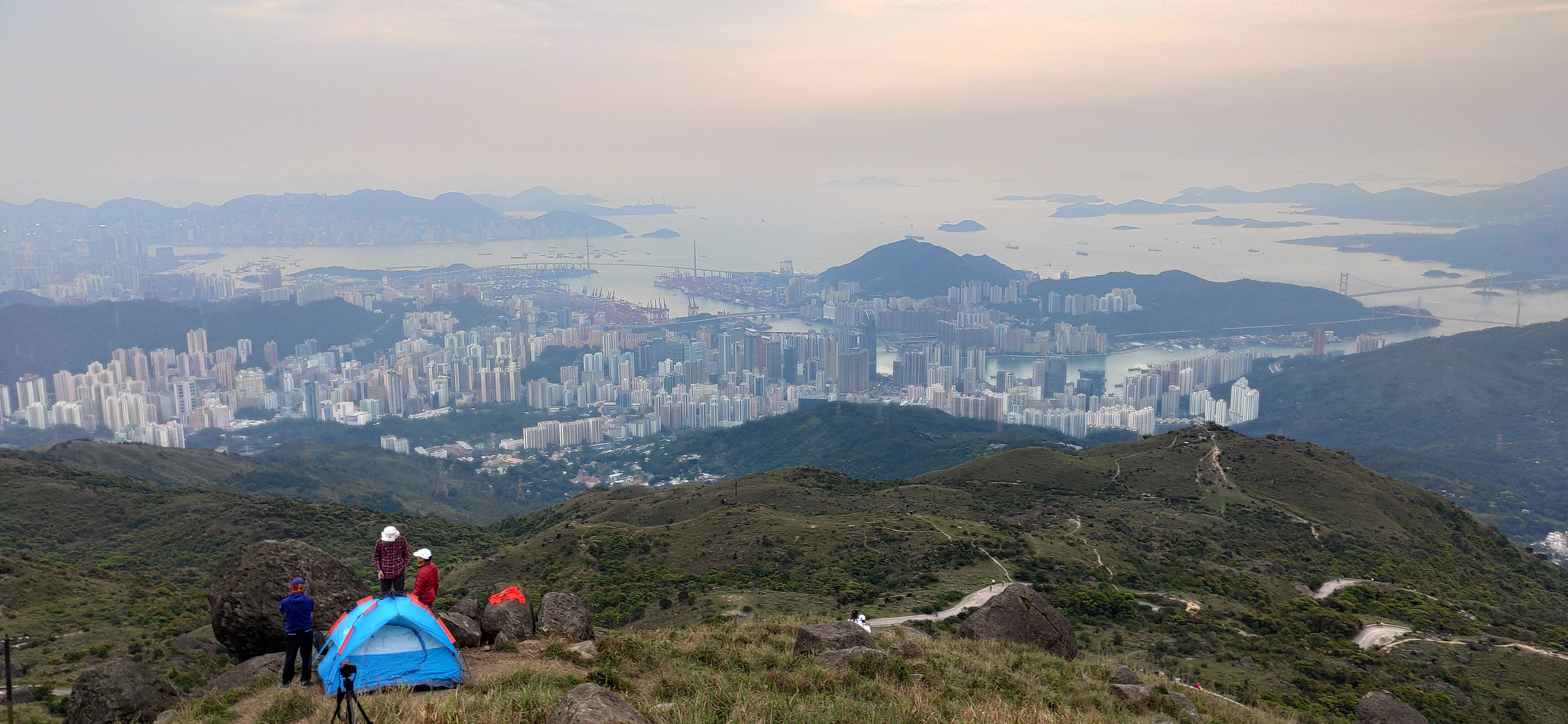
Tsuen Wan (Bottom Right), Tsing Yi and Kwai Chung

According to a report by the Hong Kong Archaeological Society, people settled in Tsuen Wan as early as 2,000 years ago. In earlier days, it was known as Tsin Wan (淺灣) which means shallow bay, and later renamed to Tsuen Wan. Another name Tsak Wan (賊灣, Hakka dialect pronunciation: tshet wan), pirate bay, indicates the presence of pirates nearby long ago. In fact, the area around Rambler Channel was known as Sam Pak Tsin (三百錢), literally meaning three hundred coins. There was a legend that pirates would collect three hundred coins should one pass through the area.

In 1911, there were approximately 3,000 villagers living in Tsuen Wan. In the 20th century, factories moved in gradually due to its proximity to Kowloon. With the construction of Castle Peak Road in 1917, motor vehicles could reach the town in addition to access on foot and by boat. Regular bus services did not begin until 1933. Early industries relied on the ample local water supply to make incense sticks, preserved fruit and farming, while post-war industries included metal wares and textiles. By 1950s, Tsuen Wan had become the centre of the textile industry in Hong Kong.

In the 1950s, the Hong Kong Government developed the area as a satellite town, along with Kwun Tong satellite town in Eastern Kowloon. In 1961, Tsuen Wan Satellite Town was expanded to become Tsuen Wan New Town, the first of such in Hong Kong. The new town covers not only Tsuen Wan, but also neighbouring Kwai Chung and Tsing Yi, including housing estates like the Fuk Loi Estate, built in 1967. By 1971, the area housed 400,000 residents. It was one of the last areas in Hong Kong to be developed without the "Colony Outline Plan". A museum of a local settlement village is located in Tsuen Wan Town: Sam Tung Uk Museum. The museum consists of a 200-year-old walled village featuring exhibits designed to replicate traditional village life. It was donated in 1981 and after restoration during the construction of the MTR, it was opened for the public in 1987.

Tsuen Wan has one of the highest concentrations of Shanghainese people in Hong Kong, particularly in the constituency Fuk Loi.

== Geography ==
Before infilling in the 1960, Tsuen Wan was a shallow bay with three waterways or nullahs that flowed to it. The nullahs are now diverted into man made underground systems but these roads:

- Tai Chung Road or "Big Stream Road" was the biggest stream remained as open nullah until it was covered by 1980 both north and south of Castle Peak Road
- Tai Ho Road ("Big River Road") with nullah fully buried during reclamation in the 1960s south of Castle Peak Road
- Kwan Mun Hau Street / Luen Yan Street mainly south of Castle Peak Road but section behind Shing Mun Swimming Pool are still visible

== Landmarks ==
Discovery Park, one of Hong Kong's largest shopping centres, is located in the heart of Tsuen Wan Town. There is a goldsmith street there where jewels can be purchased. Other features include Tsuen Wan Plaza, Tsuen Wan City Landmark, Citywalk and L'Hotel, The Sam Tung Uk Museum, Tin Hau Temple and The Panda Hotel, one of the biggest hotels in Hong Kong. The Nina Towers, which include an 80-storey tower, rise over Tsuen Wan. Hong Kong's cable TV service company i-CABLE also has their headquarters located in Tsuen Wan at Wharf Cable Tower.

Situated in the valley, floodplain and reclaimed land, Tsuen Wan is surrounded on two sides by hills and woodlands that make up the Shing Mun Country Park and the Tai Mo Shan Country Park. Located within these parks are the Tai Mo Shan peak, the highest point in Hong Kong at 957 metres (3,140 feet), and the Upper Shing Mun Reservoir. Route Twisk winds over and through the country parks linking Tsuen Wan with Pat Heung, via Shek Kong. Originally built by the Royal Engineers as a military road, it was opened to the public on 25 May 1961.

An urban renewal project led to the shopping malls Citywalk and Citywalk 2, as well as the residential areas above it.

The former Tsuen Wan Sports Ground, on Yeung Uk Road, was demolished and replaced by the Shing Mun Valley Sports Ground. The site, now known as Tsuen Wan Town Lot 393, remains abandoned, but was sold by the government for nearly HK$4 billion in 2014 to Vincord Limited.

== Housing ==
=== Private housing estates ===
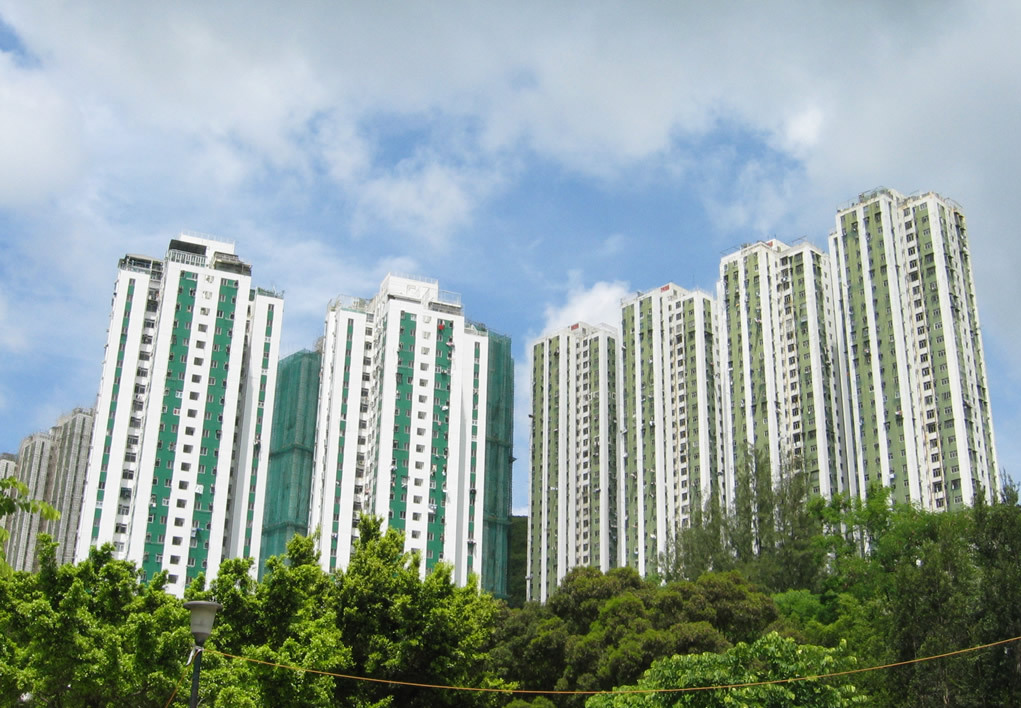
Allway Gardens

Private housing estates in Tsuen Wan include:

- Allway Gardens is the earliest and one of the largest private housing estates in Tsuen Wan. It was developed by Hopewell Holdings. It is located on Tsuen King Circuit, a hilltop at the west of Tsuen Wan. It comprises sixteen towers in four phases, completed between 1978 and 1981.
- Belvedere Garden
- The Cairnhill
- The Cliveden
- Discovery Park
- The Dynasty
- The Westminster Terrace
- Luk Yeung Sun Chuen
- Riviera Gardens
- Serenade Cove
- Skyline Plaza
- Tsuen King Garden
- Tsuen Wan Centre
- Tsuen Wan City Landmark
- Tsuen Wan Plaza

== Economy ==
Chinachem has its head office in Nina Tower in Tsuen Wan.

== Education ==
- Tsuen Wan Government Secondary School
- Hoi Pa Street Government Primary School
- Tsuen Wan Government Primary School
- St. Francis Xavier's School Tsuen Wan
- Holy Cross Lutheran School
- Mary Of Providence Primary School (W.D.)
- Hong Kong Baptist Convention Primary School
- Ho Fung College
- Rosebud Primary School
- Po On Commercial Association Wong Siu Ching Secondary School

Tsuen Wan is in Primary One Admission (POA) School Net 62, which includes schools in Tsuen Wan and areas nearby. The net includes multiple aided schools and one government school, Hoi Pa Street Government Primary School.

== Public transport ==
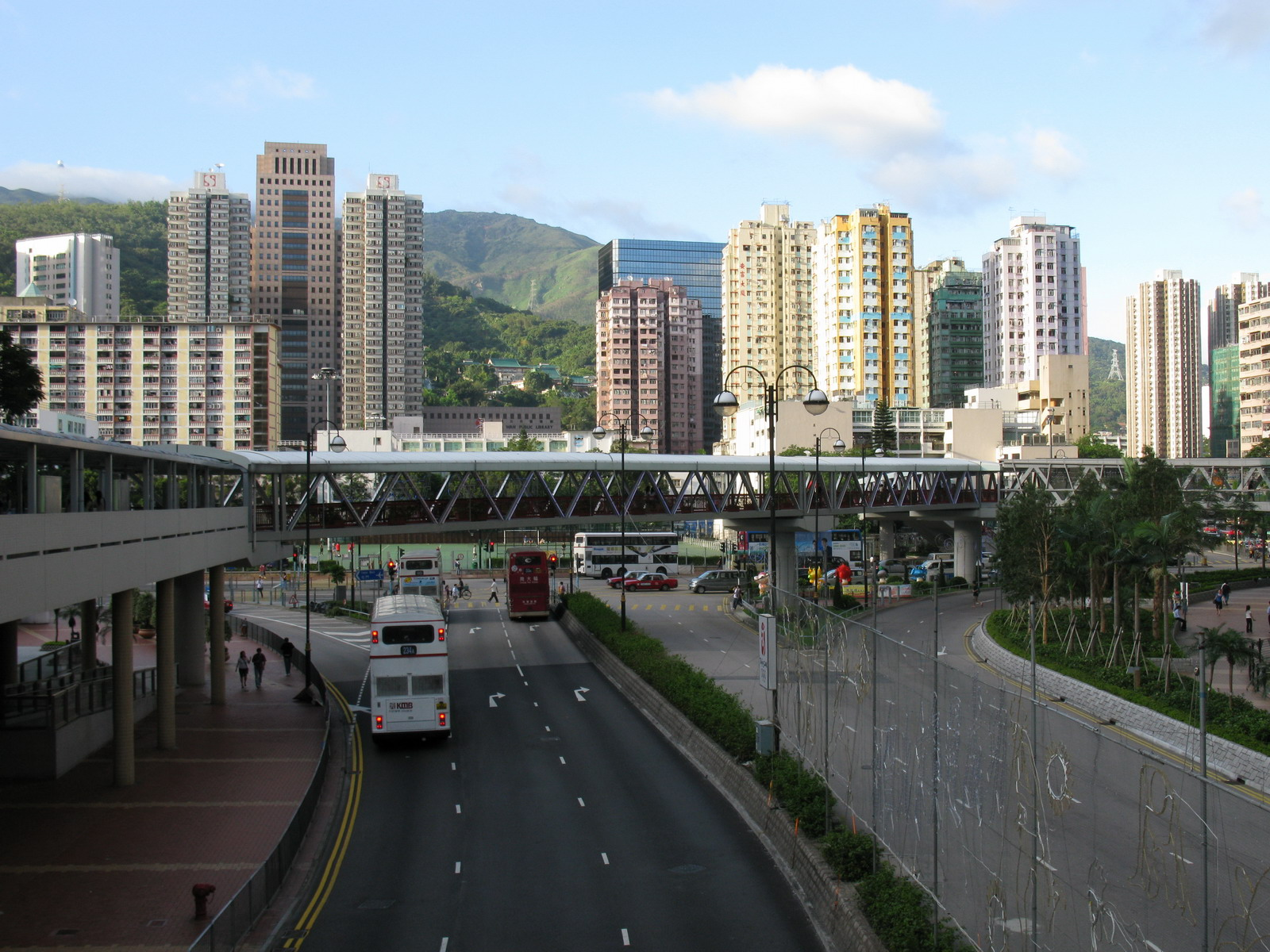
Tai Ho Road

=== Trains ===
Tsuen Wan is served by three Mass Transit Railway (MTR) stations: Tsuen Wan station and Tai Wo Hau station on the Tsuen Wan line, as well as Tsuen Wan West station on the Tuen Ma line.

=== Ferries ===
The Tsuen Wan Pier connects Tsuen Wan to Park Island, a private housing estate in Ma Wan.

=== Buses ===
The Tsuen Wan Transport Complex was once a major interchange point between ferries and buses. It was rendered obsolete when land reclamation moved the adjacent ferry pier, and when ferry services were scaled back following the opening of the MTR.

Tsuen Wan is still well-served by many bus routes. There are major bus termini at Tsuen Wan and Tsuen Wan West railway stations, and at some private developments like Nina Tower and Allway Gardens. There are also many minibuses to major destinations around Hong Kong.

== See also ==
- Cable TV Tower
- Chai Wan Kok
- Concord Square (Hong Kong)
- Luk Yeung Galleria
- Nan Fung Centre
- Panda Place
- Tai Wo Hau
- The Mills, Hong Kong
- Tsuen Wan Environmental Resource Centre
- Tsuen Wan Park
- Tsuen Wan Pier
- Tsuen Wan Rural Committee
- Tsuen Wan Town Hall
- Tsuen Wan West
- Yuen Tsuen Ancient Trail
