= Panda Hotel =

Hotel in Tsuen Wan, Hong Kong

Coordinates: 22.36906°N 114.12072°E

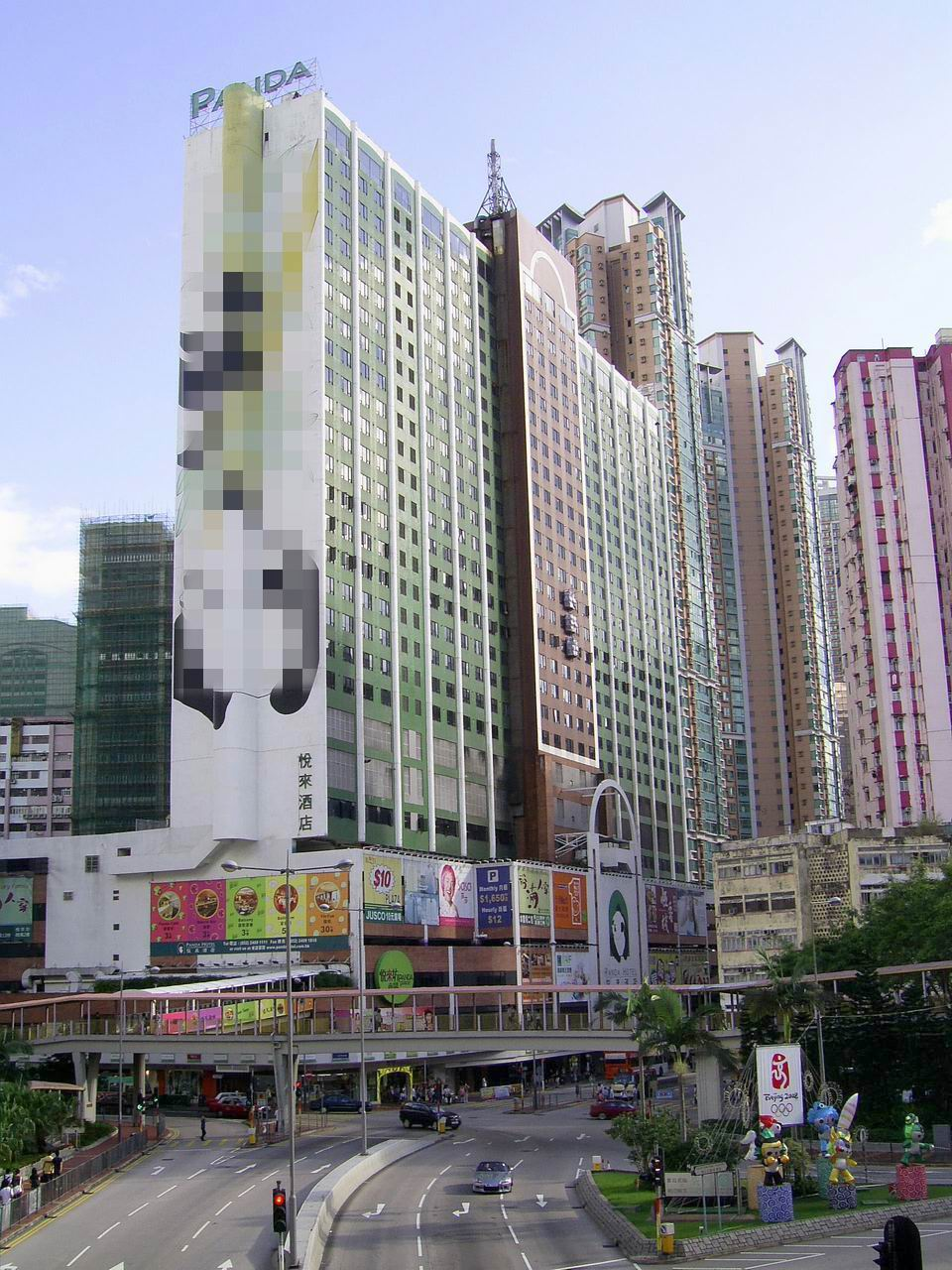
- Panda Hotel in 2008
- Traditional Chinese: 悅來酒店
- Simplified Chinese: 悦来酒店
- Literal meaning: Pleased to arrive hotel
Transcriptions
Standard Mandarin
- Hanyu Pinyin: Yuèlái Jiǔdiàn
Yue: Cantonese
- Jyutping: jyut^{6} loi^{4} zau^{2} dim^{3}

Kowloon Panda Hotel
- Traditional Chinese: 九龍悅來酒店
- Simplified Chinese: 九龙悦来酒店
Transcriptions
Standard Mandarin
- Hanyu Pinyin: Jiǔlóng Yuèlái Jiǔdiàn
Yue: Cantonese
- Jyutping: gau^{2} lung^{4} jyut^{6} loi^{4} zau^{2} dim^{3}

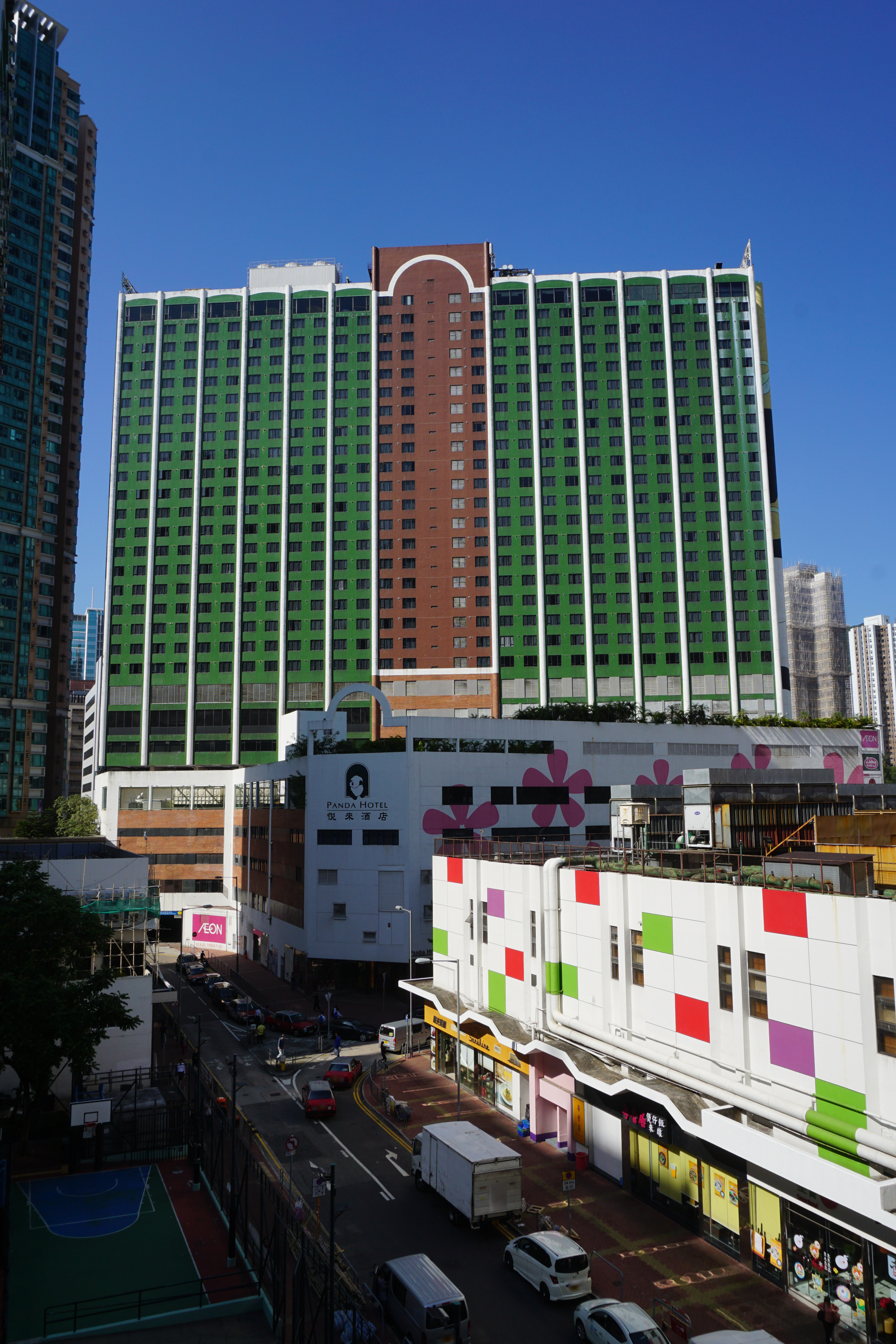
Panda Hotel viewed from the front, 2016

Panda Hotel (Chinese: 悅來酒店), formerly Kowloon Panda Hotel (Chinese: 九龍悅來酒店), is a hotel in Tsuen Wan, New Territories, Hong Kong, located between MTR Tsuen Wan station and Tai Wo Hau station.

It is the largest hotel in Tsuen Wan District, with a total of 1,026 rooms. It is developed, owned and managed by Hopewell Holdings.

== Panda Place ==
Panda Place (悅來坊) is a shopping arcade inside the Panda Hotel. It occupies 200,000 square feet (19,000 m^{2}) at the second floor, ground floor and three basement levels beneath the hotel. It is also owned by Hopewell Holdings.

Panda Place was formerly the Japanese department store Yaohan's Tsuen Wan Branch. The site became vacant after Yaohan collapsed during the Asian Financial Crisis in 1997. In 2005, Hopewell redeveloped and renamed the premises.

== 2025 murder-suicide case ==
A 37-year-old man fell to his death after forcing open a window at Panda Hotel in Tsuen Wan on Sunday morning, while his 36-year-old wife and their two young sons, aged six and three, were found lifeless inside the room. A suicide prevention expert has indicated that the depression and extreme pressures experienced by the deceased man in a murder-suicide incident at Panda Hotel may have contributed to the tragic fatalities of his family, calling for individuals facing mental health challenges to seek appropriate assistance. According to a suicide note posted on his social media platform, it is believed that his actions may have been influenced by concerns regarding his ability to provide for and care for his family.
