= Discovery Park (Hong Kong) =

Discovery Park 愉景新城

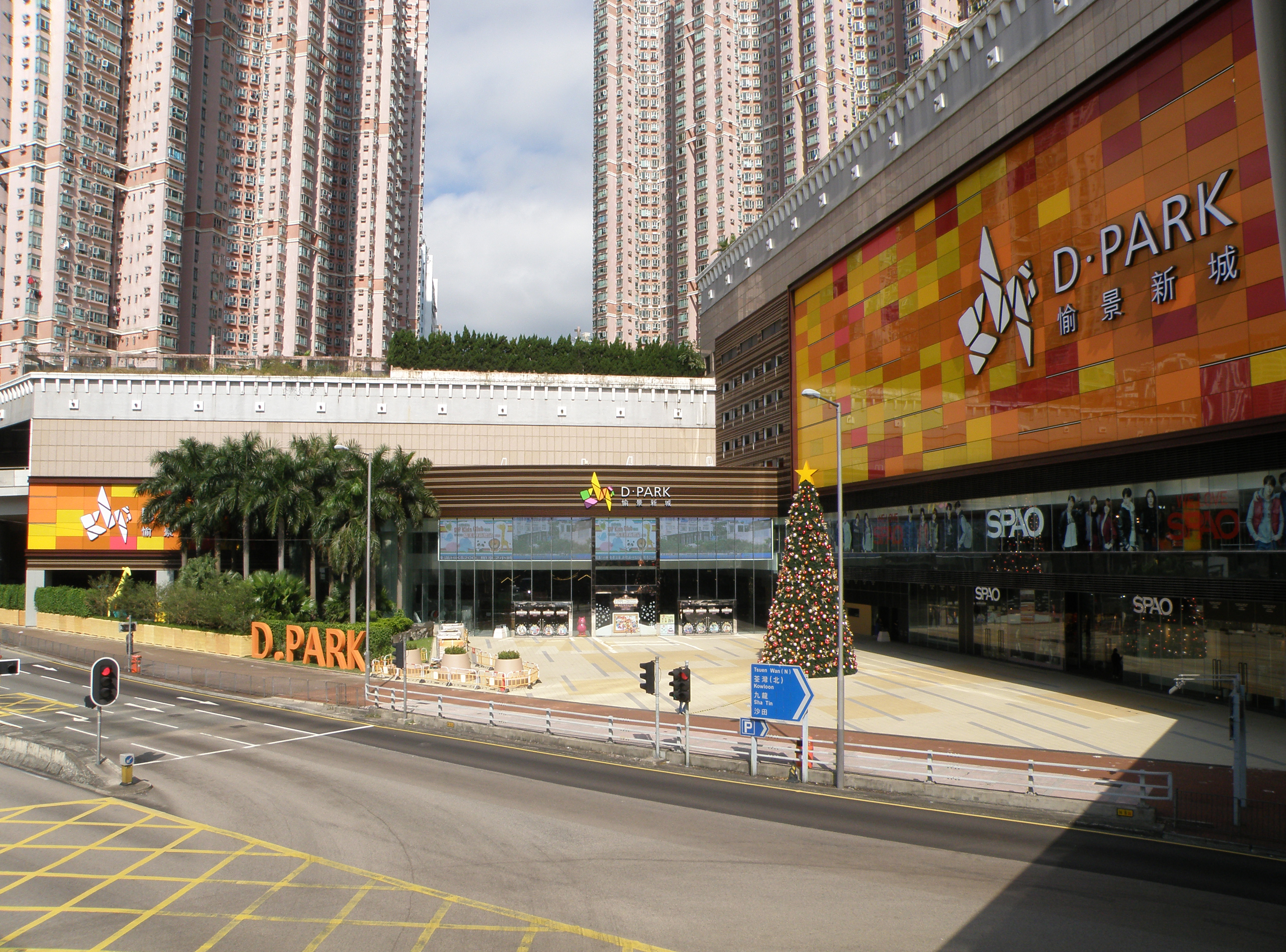
- D•Park
- Website: https://www.dpark.com.hk

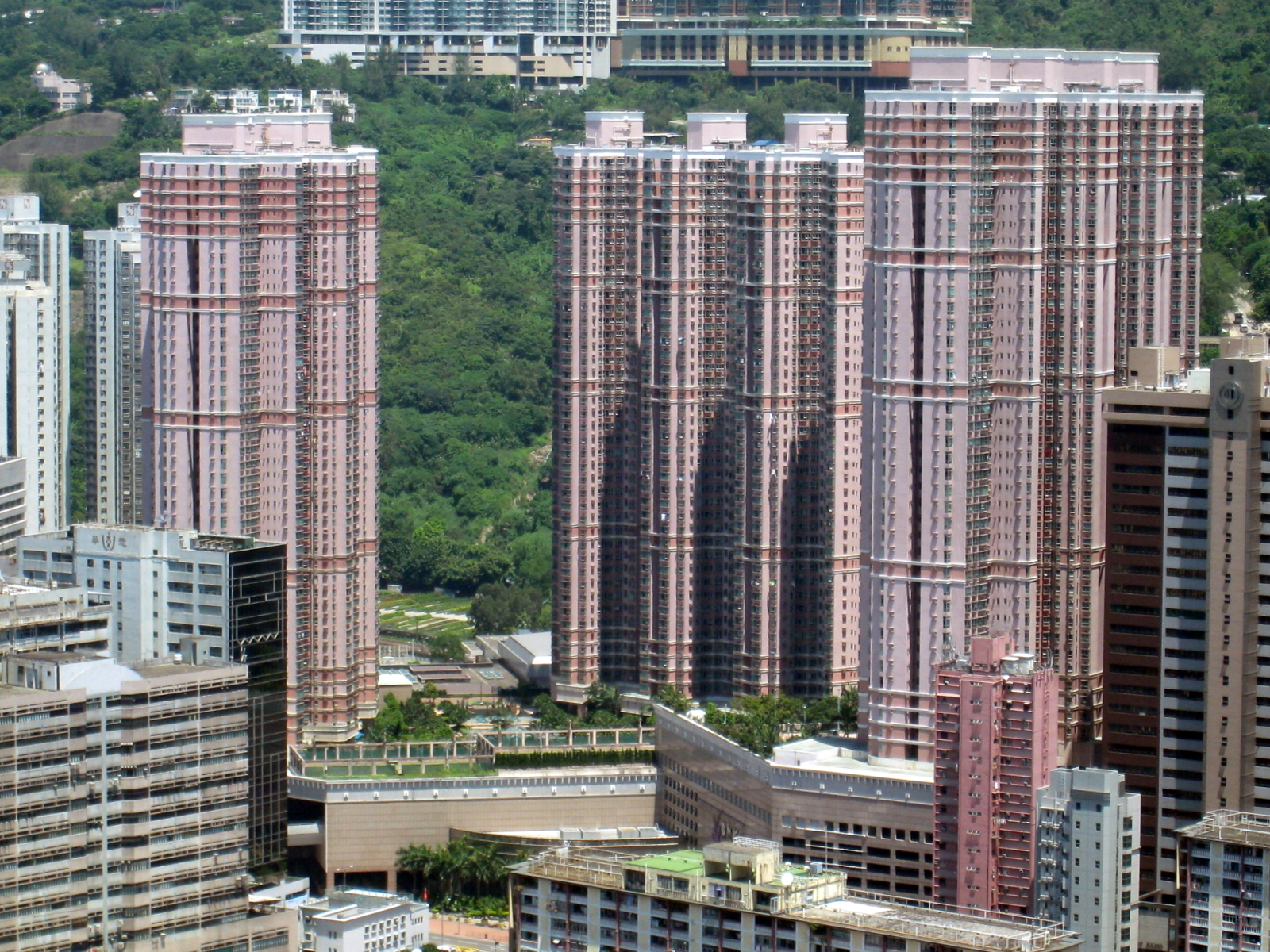
Discovery Park.

Discovery Park (Chinese: 愉景新城), formerly and still commonly known as D·PARK, is a residential development in Hong Kong, located at 398 Castle Peak Road, Tsuen Wan in the New Territories. The whole estate including the residential flats and the shopping centre spans over 2,700,000 square feet (250,000 m^{2}).

Its developer is Hong Kong Resort Company Limited and New World Development Company Limited is responsible for the management of the shopping centre.

== Phases of development ==
- Phase 1: Block 1 to 4 (completed in May 1997)
- Phase 2: Block 5 to 8 (completed in January 1998)
- Phase 3: Block 8 to 12 (completed in May 1998)

There are a total of 3,360 units with unit size ranged from 593 sq ft (55.1 m^{2}). to 848 sq ft (78.8 m^{2}). The development has a shopping centre, a clubhouse of 40,000 sq ft (3,700 m^{2})., a swimming pool of 8,000 sq ft (740 m^{2}). tennis courts, golf putting green, sauna rooms, carpark, etc. The price of development was considered attractive to small families, as most of the estates in the vicinity were relatively old constructions.

The first phase of the development was launched amid the property bubble in 1997, and units were subject of many speculators' interest. The intensity spilled over to properties in neighbouring estates in Sham Tseng and Castle Peak, and stimulated a three-fold increase in transactions in the area in September compared with the month before, according to Centaline, Hong Kong's leading real estate agency chain.

== Shopping mall ==
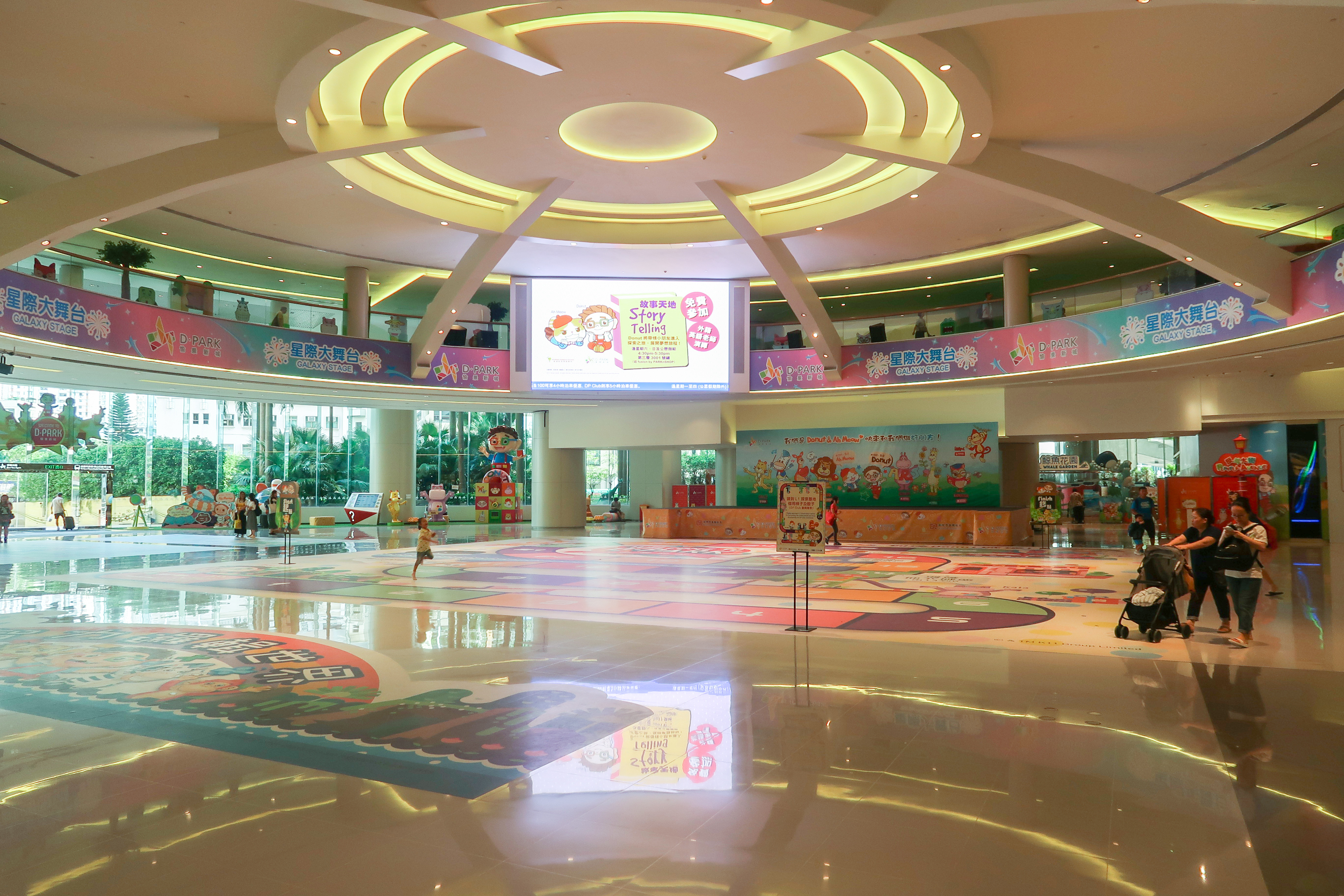
Discovery Park after renovation in 2016

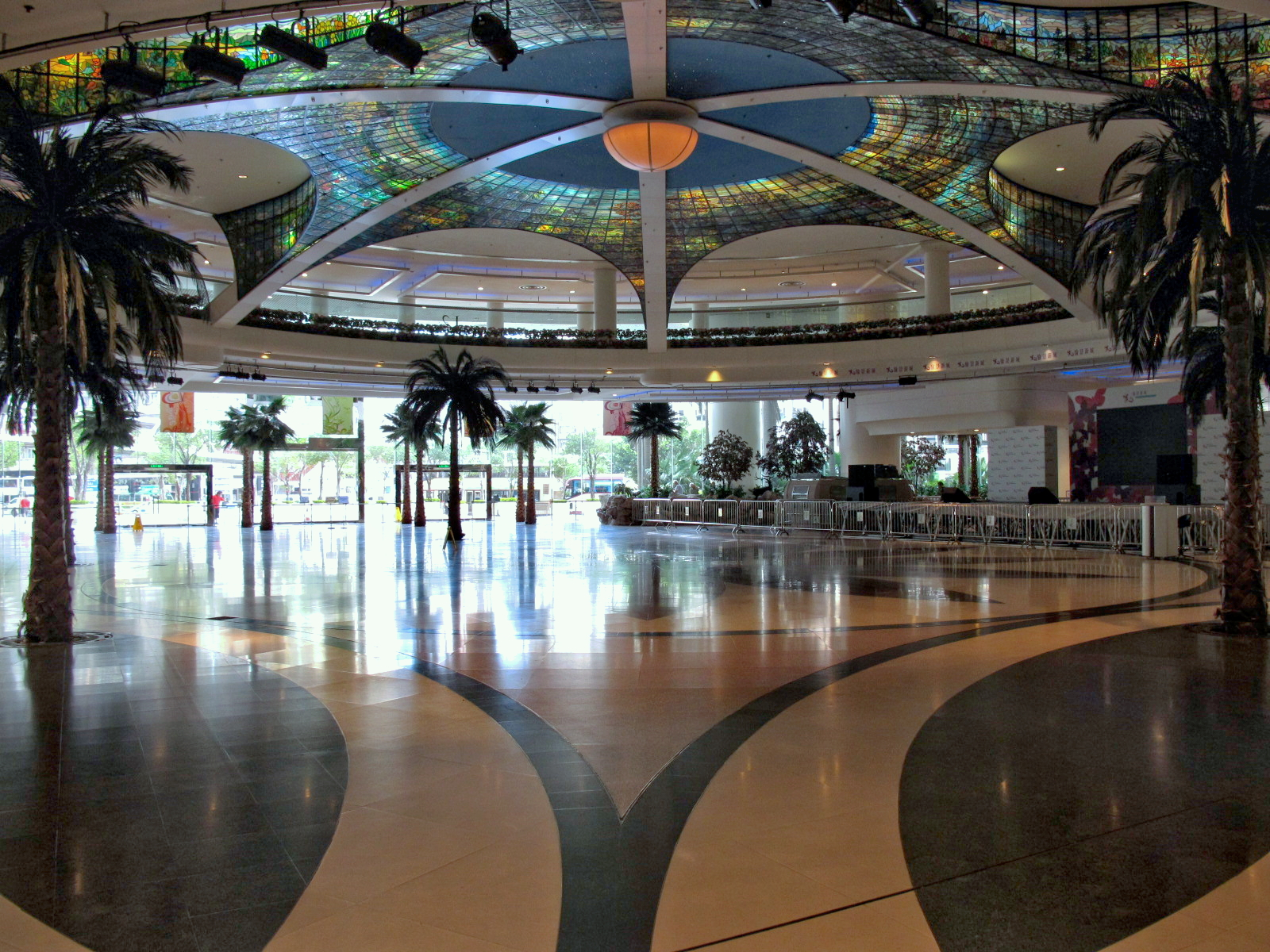
Discovery Park Sky Dome Atrium before renovation in 2011

The 630,000 sq ft (59,000 m^{2}). shopping centre was conceived as a mixture of shopping mall and park. It is considered as the first of its kind as a "Shopping Park". The shopping centre is themed as a tropical rain forest, an artificial waterfall and pillars decorated by big fruits were made. The roof of the main lobby is a stained glass dome which allows penetratration of natural daylight.

The shopping centre was recently renamed "D•Park", remodeled, and rebranded as Hong Kong's first "parenting-oriented shopping mall".

== Facilities nearby ==
Above the Discovery Park bus terminus is the Tsuen King Circuit Indoor Recreation Centre. Tsuen Wan Police District Headquarters and Divisional Station is opposite to the estate, between them is Tsuen King Circuit.

== Location ==
Geographical coordinates: 22°22′35″N 114°6′44″E

== Transport ==
=== Road ===
==== Route 9 extension ====
On 8 February 2007, Cheung Pei Shan Road, the section of Route 9 linking Chai Wan Kok and Shek Wai Kok was opened. This section passes through the reserved area of the shopping mall building. However, the road is not directly connected to the development.

=== MTR ===
Five-minute walk from to Tsuen Wan MTR station in the air-conditioned walkway which links from the estate.

=== Bus ===
As it is located at the side of Castle Peak Road, there are numerous bus routes with stops at Discovery Park.

== Demographics ==
According to the 2016 by-census, Discovery Park had a population of 8,893. The median age was 42.3 and the majority of residents (92.7 per cent) were of Chinese ethnicity. The average household size was 2.7 people. The median monthly household income of all households (i.e. including both economically active and inactive households) was HK$51,500.

== Politics ==
Discovery Park is located in Discovery Park constituency of the Tsuen Wan District Council. It is currently represented by Lau Cheuk-yu, who was elected in the 2019 elections.

== See also ==
- Tsuen Wan New Town
- Tsuen Wan station
