= Luk Yeung Sun Chuen =

Housing estate in Tsuen Wan, Hong Kong

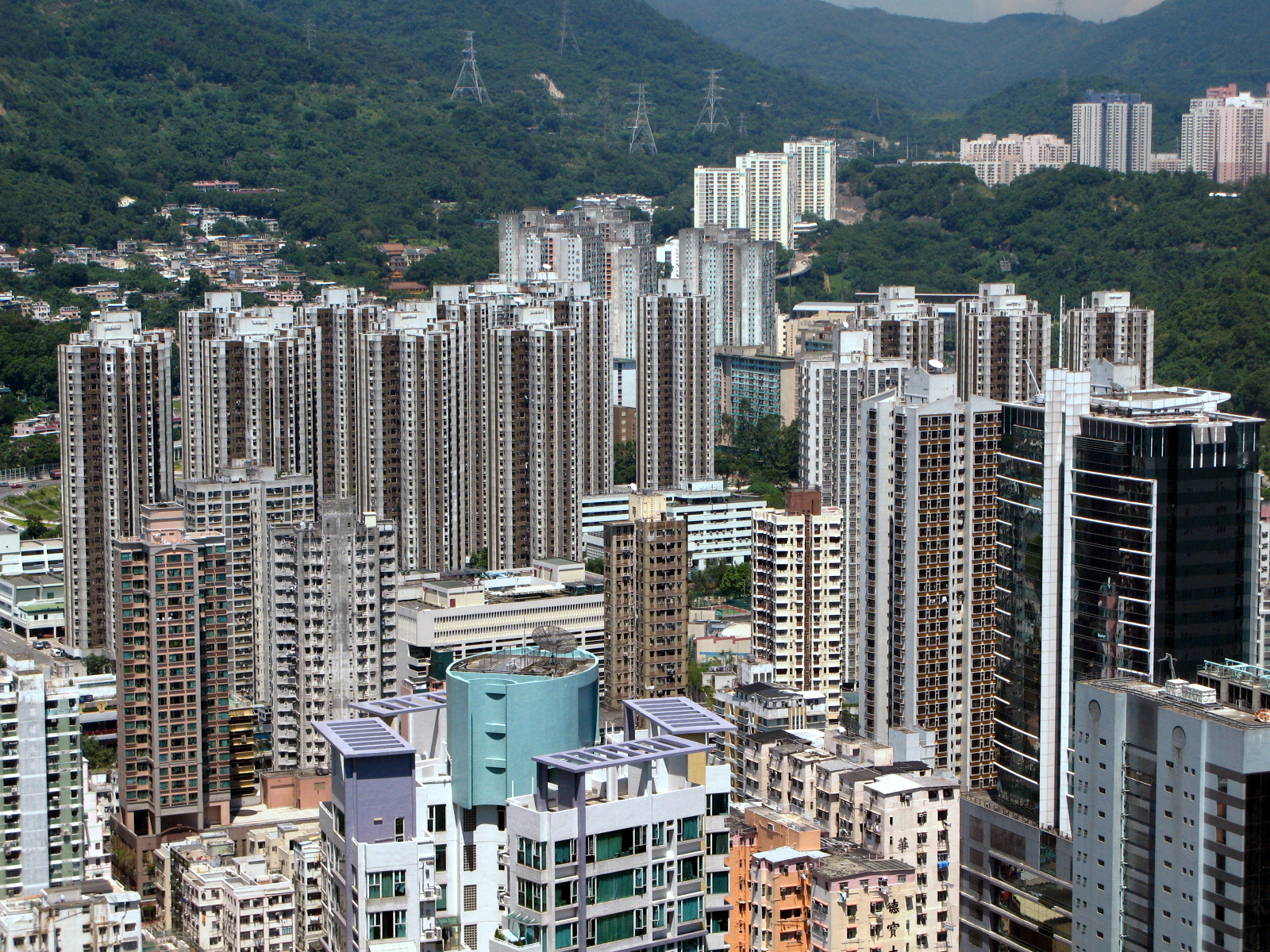
- Luk Yeung Sun Chuen (middle ground) in March 2008
- Interactive map of Luk Yeung Sun Chuen

General information
- Location: 22-66 Wai Tsuen Road, Tsuen Wan, New Territories
- Coordinates: 22.37363°N 114.11990°E
- Status: Completed
- Population: 10,742 (2016)
- No. of blocks: 17
- No. of units: 4,056

Construction
- Constructed: 1979–1984

Luk Yeung Sun Chuen
- Traditional Chinese: 綠楊新邨
- Simplified Chinese: 绿杨新邨
Transcriptions
Standard Mandarin
- Hanyu Pinyin: Lǜ Yáng Xīn Cūn
Yue: Cantonese
- Jyutping: luk6 joeng4 san1 cyun1

Luk Yeung Sun Chuen (Chinese: 綠楊新邨) is a private housing estate adjacent to the MTR Tsuen Wan station, Tsuen Wan, New Territories, Hong Kong. It comprises 17 high-rise buildings with a total of 4000 flats. It was developed in 1983 and 1984 by a consortium of property developers, including MTR Corporation, Hong Kong Land, Jardine Matheson Holdings, Kiu Kwong Investment and Dah Sing Group.

The MTR Tsuen Wan Depot is located underneath Luk Yeung Sun Chuen.

== History ==
In 1977, the Mass Transit Railway Corporation (MTRC) began seeking developers with whom to form a joint venture responsible for developing the airspace above the Tsuen Wan Extension railway depot. In 1979, MTRC awarded the contract to build the depot, including the columns and podium slab for the topside development, to the Dragages Coignet Joint Venture.

The residential blocks received their respective occupation permits during 1983 and 1984.

== Demographics ==
According to the 2016 by-census, Luk Yeung Sun Chuen had a population of 10,742. The median age was 43.6 and the majority of residents (94 per cent) were of Chinese ethnicity. The average household comprised 2.9 persons. The median monthly household income of all households (i.e. including both economically active and inactive households) was HK$36,440.

== Politics ==
Luk Yeung Sun Chuen is located in Luk Yeung constituency of the Tsuen Wan District Council. It was formerly represented by Roy Pun Long-chung, who was elected in the 2019 elections until July 2021.

== Facilities ==
Luk Yeung Galleria is a major shopping centre owned by the MTR Corporation. The estate is also home to Liu Po Shan Memorial College and Kwai-ming Wu Memorial School of the Precious Blood.

== Education ==
Luk Yeung Sun Chuen is in Primary One Admission (POA) School Net 62, which includes schools in Tsuen Wan and areas nearby. The net includes multiple aided schools and one government school, Hoi Pa Street Government Primary School.

== Tsuen Wan Depot ==
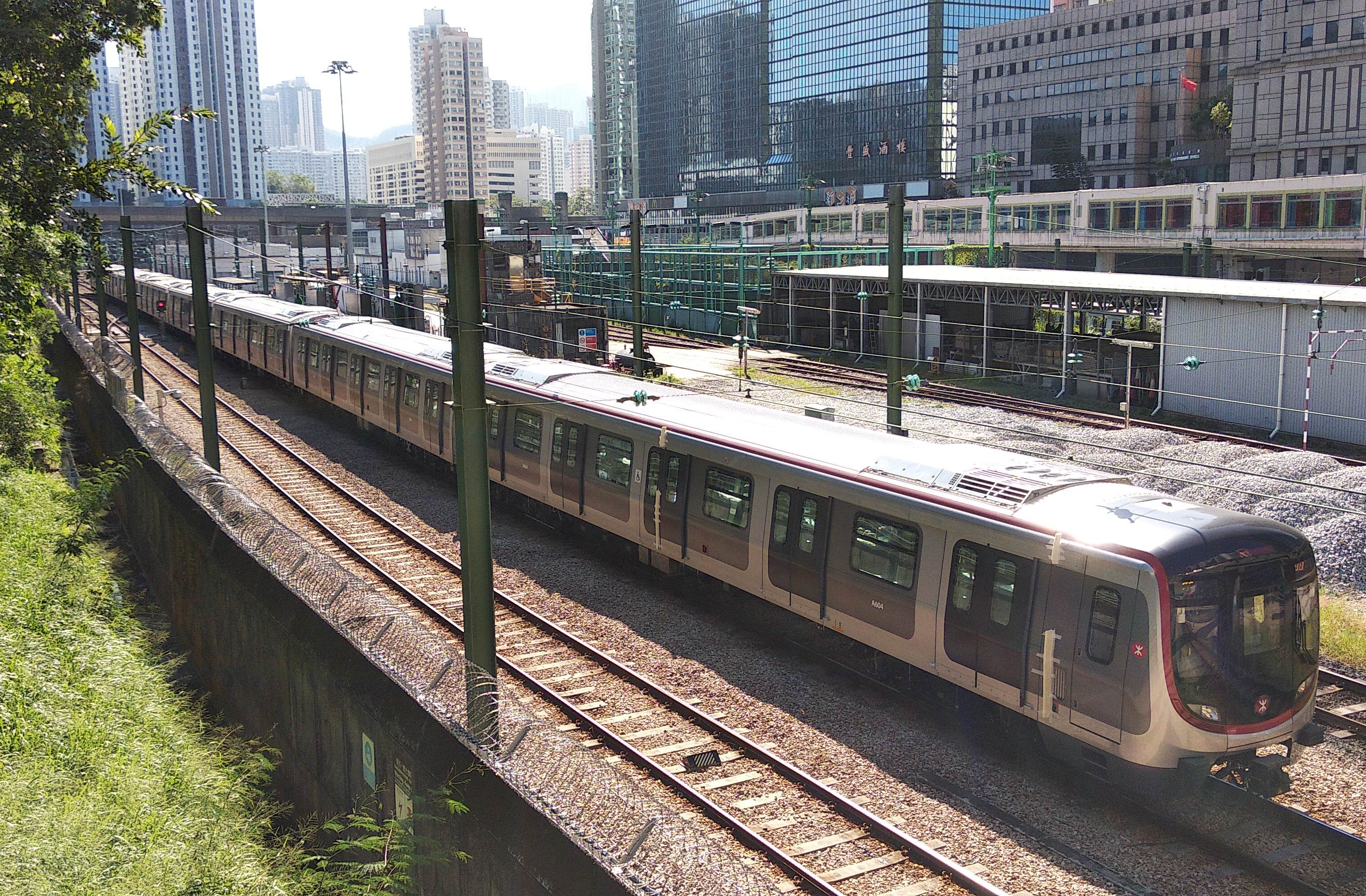
MTR Urban Lines Vision Train parked at Tsuen Wan Depot, November 2018

The Tsuen Wan Depot was built in 1982 to house and maintain MTR M-Train EMU trains serving on the Tsuen Wan line. This depot is capable of housing 40 trains, and cleaning of trains as well as minor and major inspections of trains are carried out in this depot.

From 1998 to 2001, all MTR M-Train EMU trains were refurbished at this depot under the supervision of United Goninan, the company responsible for the project.
