= MTR Properties =

Hong Kong property development company

MTR Properties and MTR Property Management of the MTR Corporation are responsible for managing apartment buildings it developed, shopping malls at some of its stations, and collaborate with land developers in projects near its stations. It made over HKD $8,304 million in 2007 from property development.

MTR Properties is also a property agent, and provide services on Octopus Access Control System and environmental hygiene service. It operates the following shopping centres: Paradise Mall, Telford Plaza, Maritime Square, Luk Yeung Galleria, The Lane. Two IFC's property management company, Premier Management Services, is a unit of MTRC.
