= Luk Yeung Galleria =

Shopping centre in Tsuen Wan, Hong Kong

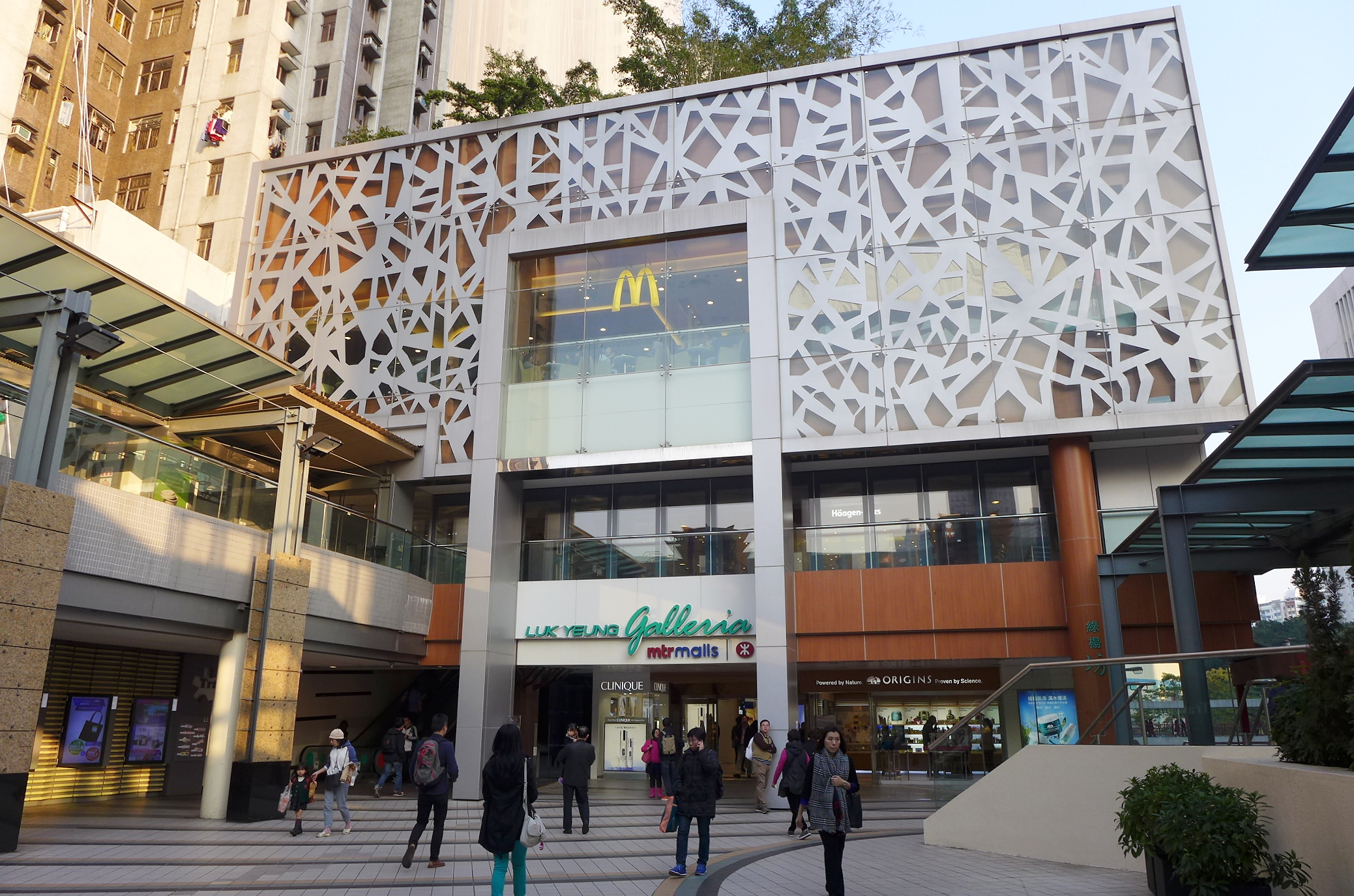
- Luk Yeung Galleria in January 2015
- Location: Tsuen Wan, Tsuen Wan District, New Territories, Hong Kong
- Coordinates: 22°22′22″N 114°07′09″E
- Address: 22-66, Wai Tsuen Road
- Opened: 1983; 43 years ago
- Developer: MTR Corporation; Hong Kong Land; Jardine Matheson Holdings; Kiu Kwong
- Manager: MTR Properties
- Owner: MTR Corporation
- Num. of stores: 85
- Floor area: 16,500 m^{2} (178,000 sq ft)
- Floors: 3
- Website: www.lukyeunggalleria.com/eng/lyg/main/index.jsp

Luk Yeung Galleria (Chinese: 綠楊坊), formally known as Luk Yeung Sun Chuen Mall, is one of the largest shopping centres in Tsuen Wan, New Territories, Hong Kong, located in Luk Yeung Sun Chuen, above MTR Tsuen Wan station. It has a total area of 16,500 square metres (178,000 ft^{2}).

It was developed in 1983 by a consortium of property developers, including MTR Corporation, Hong Kong Land, Jardine Matheson Holdings and Kiu Kwong.

== Location ==
Luk Yeung Galleria has direct access from the MTR Tsuen Wan station and footbridges connecting major shopping centres in Tsuen Wan and a bus interchange, which brings large numbers of people to the shopping centre.
