= Allway Gardens =

Housing estate in Tsuen Wan, Hong Kong

Coordinates: 22.3788°N 114.1078°E

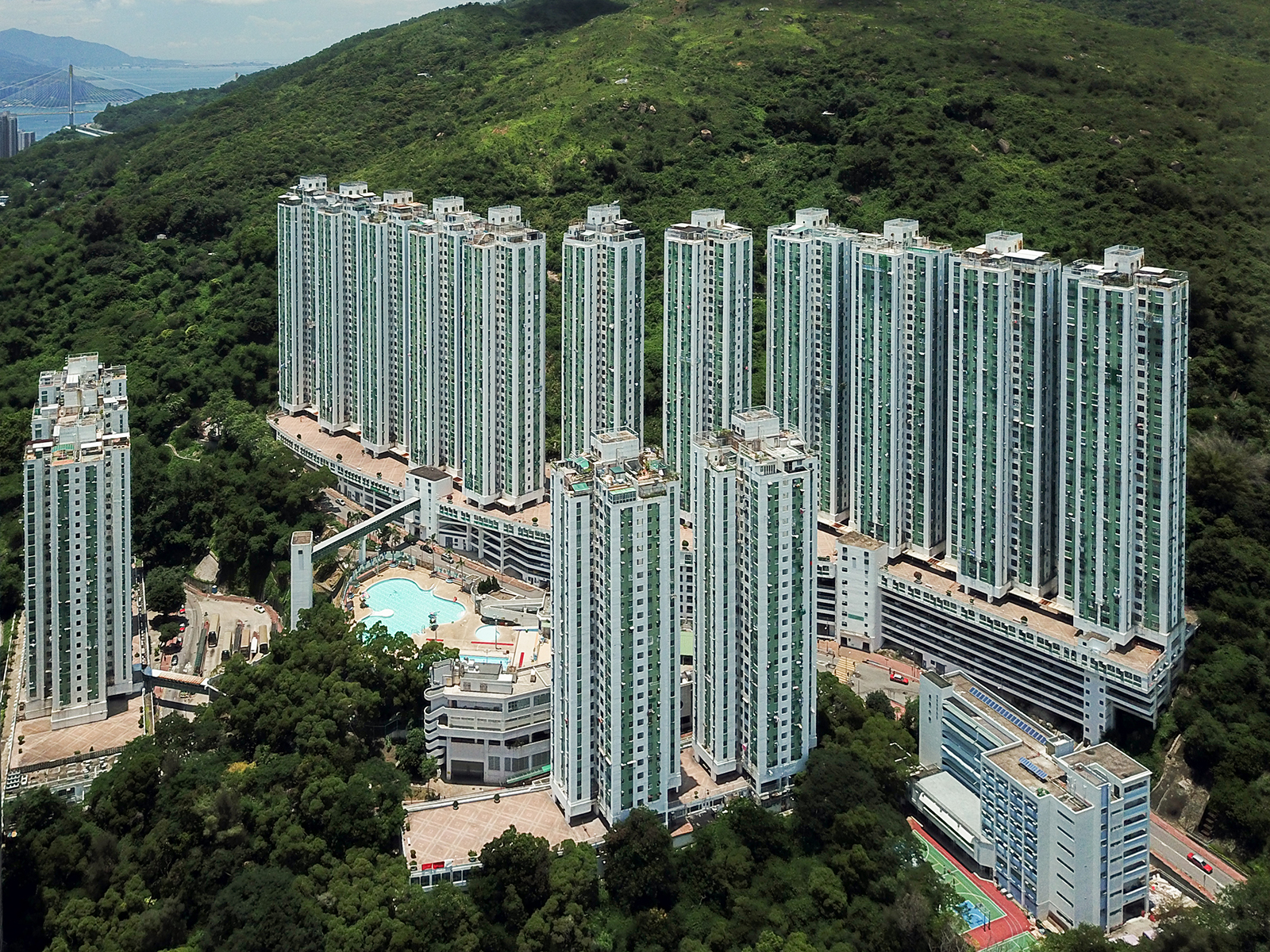
Allway Gardens

Allway Gardens (Chinese: 荃威花園) is the earliest and one of the largest-scale private housing estates located in Tsuen Wan, New Territories, Hong Kong.

It was developed by Hopewell Holdings. It is located on Tsuen King Circuit, a hilltop at the west of Tsuen Wan. It comprises 3,423 flats in sixteen towers in four phases, completed between 1978 and 1981.

== Demographics ==
According to the 2016 by-census, Allway Gardens had a population of 9,613. The median age was 44.3 and the majority of residents (96 per cent) were of Chinese ethnicity. The average household size was 2.9 people. The median monthly household income of all households (i.e. including both economically active and inactive households) was HK$38,000.

== Politics ==
Allway Gardens is located in Allway constituency of the Tsuen Wan District Council. It was formerly represented by Chiu Yan-loy, who was elected in the 2019 elections until July 2021.
