= Kolour Tsuen Wan =

Building in Tsuen Wan, Hong Kong

Coordinates: 22°22′16″N 114°7′5″E

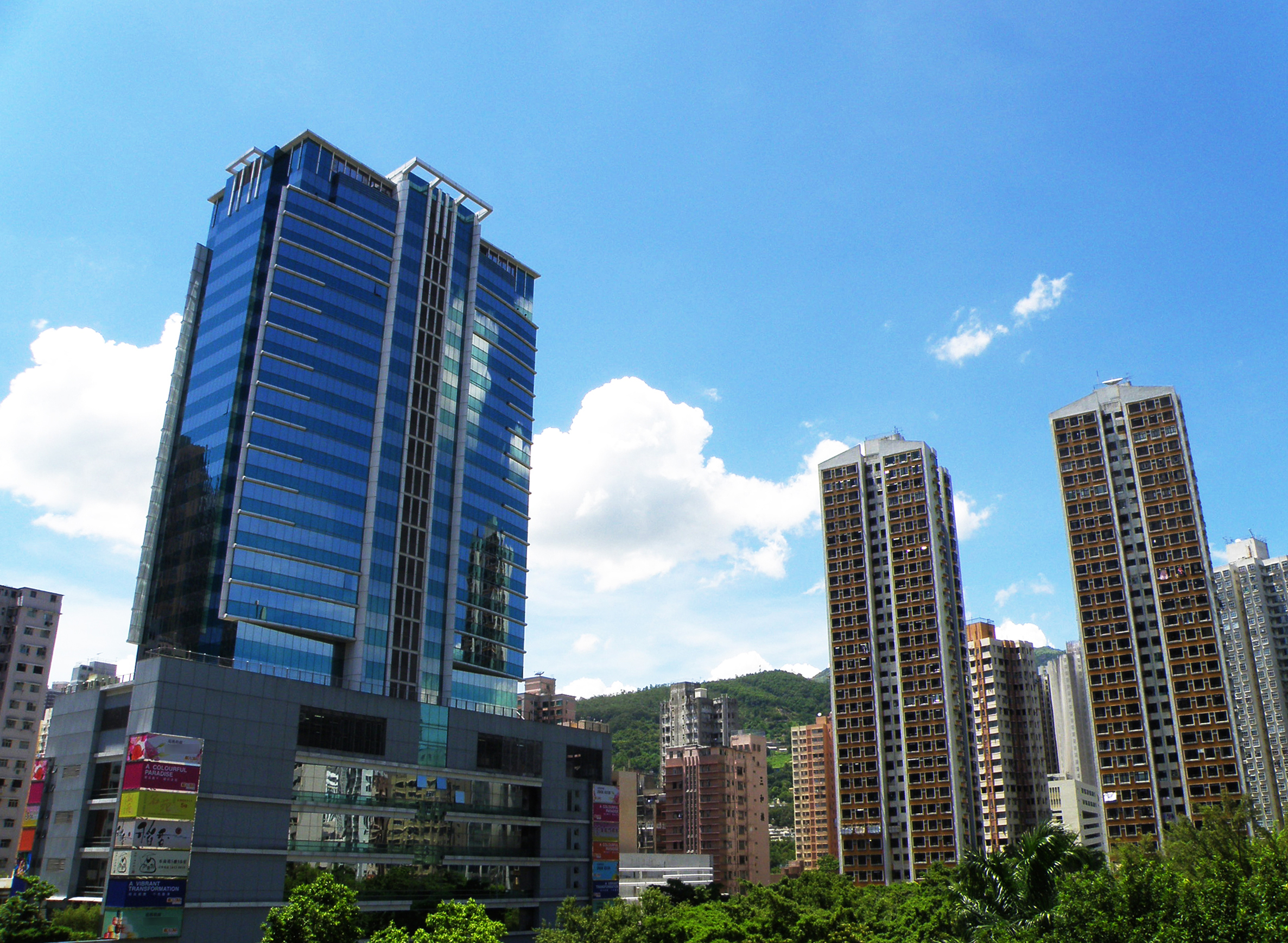
KOLOUR‧Tsuen Wan in June 2015

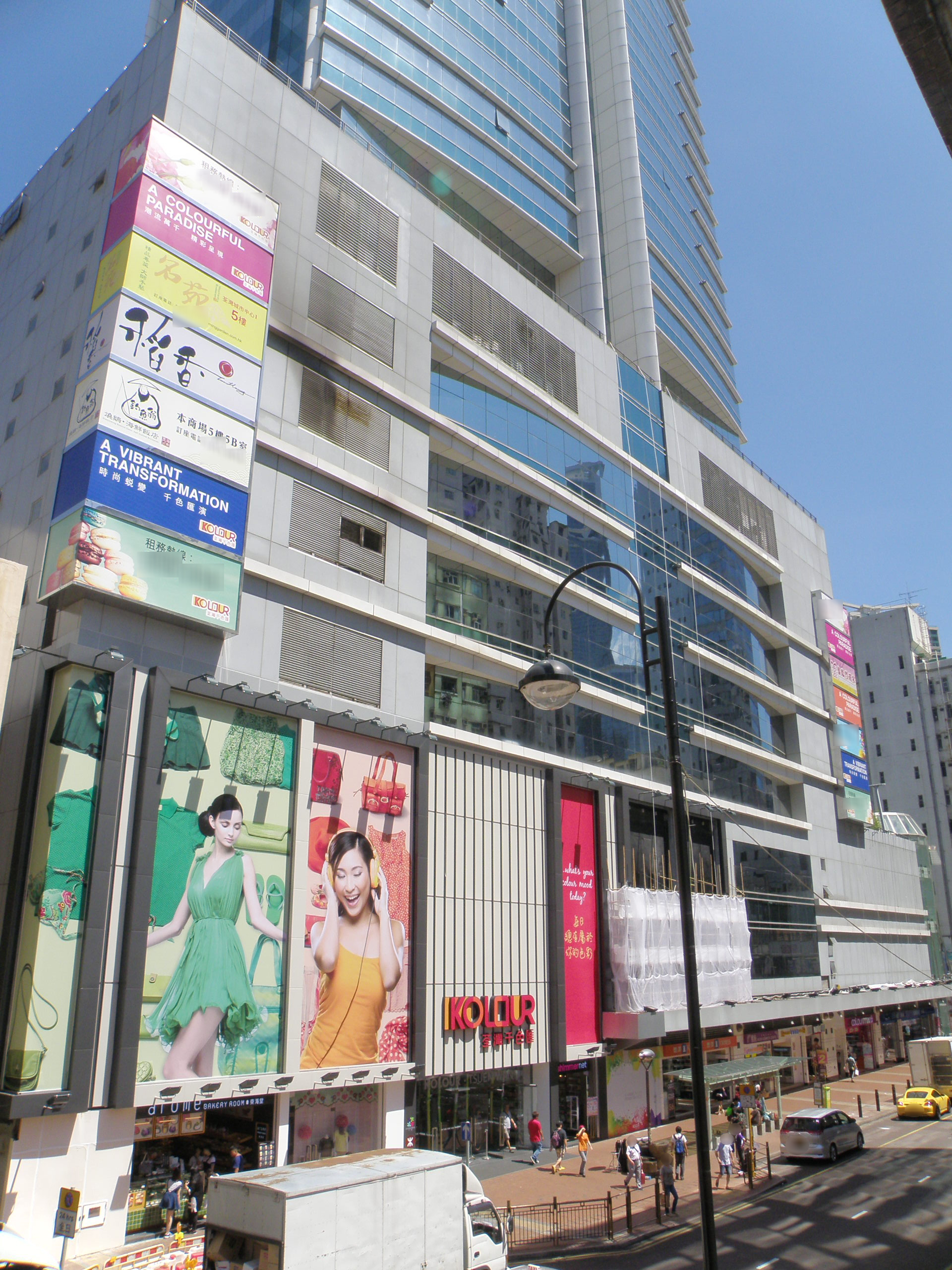
Base of KOLOUR‧Tsuen Wan I in June 2015

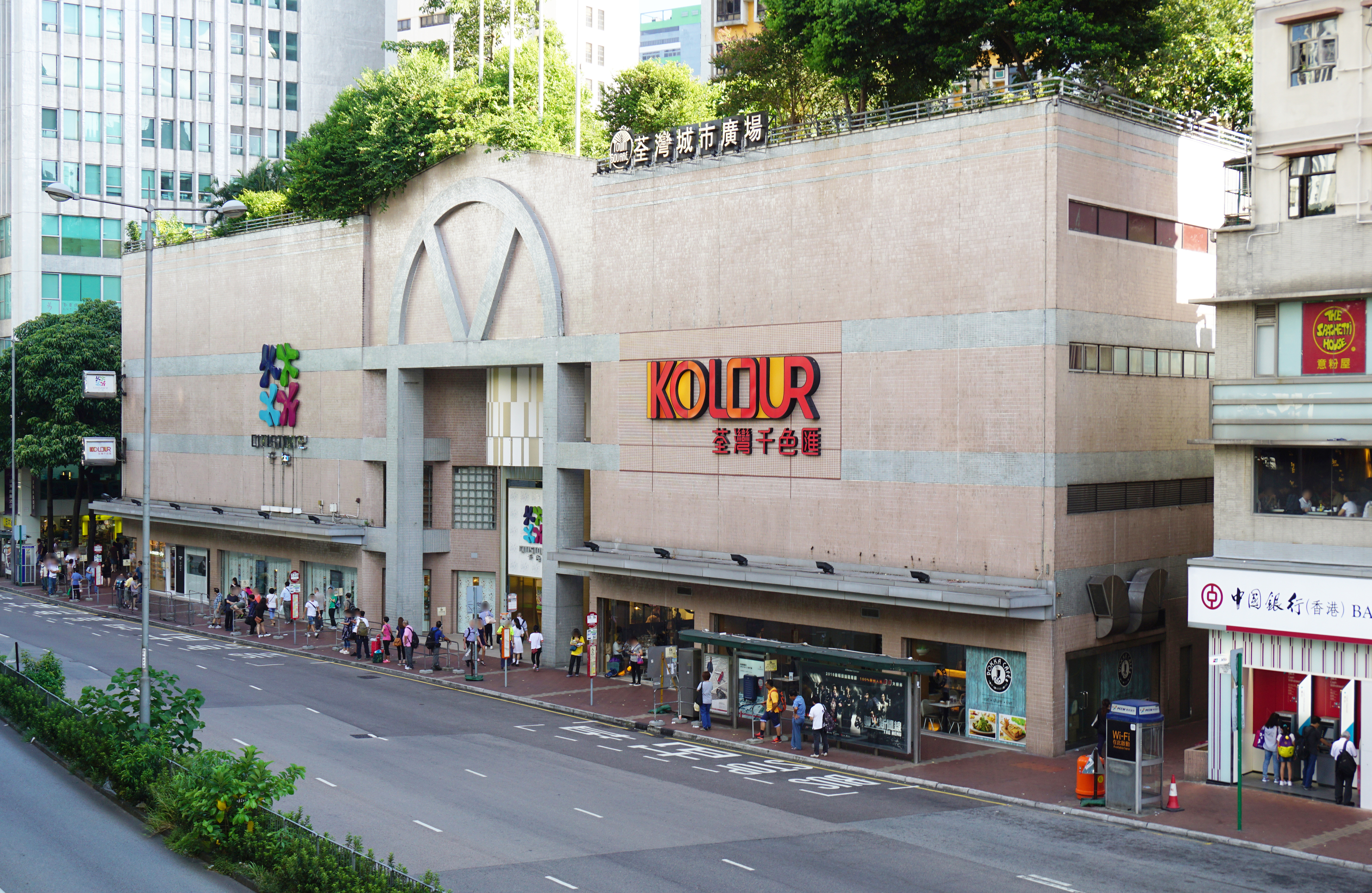
Base of KOLOUR‧Tsuen Wan II in July 2016

KOLOUR‧Tsuen Wan (Chinese: 荃灣千色匯) is a private housing estate and shopping mall in Tsuen Wan Town, New Territories, Hong Kong. Its phase 1 (previously named as Tsuen Wan City Landmark I, Chinese: 荃灣城市中心I, opened in 1996) and phase 2 (previously named as Tsuen Wan City Landmark II Chinese: 荃灣城市中心II, opened in 1989) are located at Chung On Street and Castle Peak Road respectively, and they were developed by Henderson Land Development. Residential estate above phase 2 is named Tsuen Wan Town Square (Chinese: 荃灣城市廣場).

The shopping mall in phase 1 and 2 covers the total area of 330,000 square feet (31,000 m^{2}). Two phases are connected by air-conditioned pedestrian footbridge. The largest tenant of the shopping mall is Citistore Tsuen Wan Branch, which has been regarded as one of the landmarks in Tsuen Wan Town Centre. Citistore is also the subsidiary of Henderson Land Development.
