= Tsuen Wan Centre =

Hong Kong Estate

Coordinates: 22.3788°N 114.1078°E

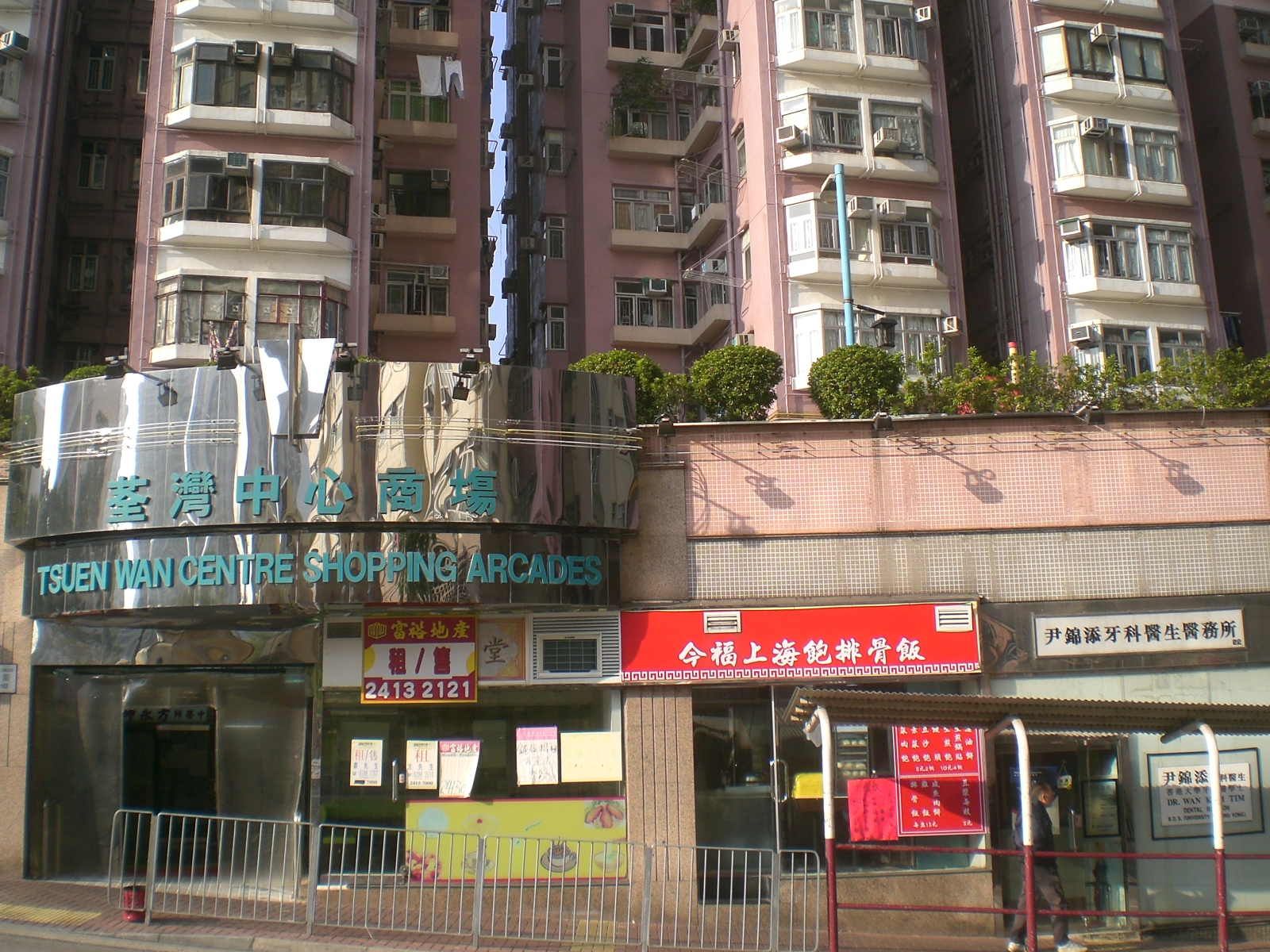
Tsuen Wan Centre

Tsuen Wan Centre (Chinese: 荃灣中心) is one of the largest private housing estates in Tsuen Wan, New Territories, Hong Kong, located at Tsuen King Circuit. It consists of 19 high-rise buildings, with their names of a number of Chinese cities, and a shopping arcade. It was divided into 3 phases which were completed between 1980 and 1982, and was developed by Sun Hung Kai Properties.

== The 19 blocks ==
Block	Building Name
1	Kwangchow House
2	Kwelin House
3	Hangchow House
4	Soochow House
5	Anking House
6	Chungking House
7	Shanghai House
8	Tiantsin House
9	Nanking House
10	Peking House
11	Nanchang House
12	Hangyang House
13	Kweiyang House
14	Chengtu House
15	Kunming House
16	Nanning House
17	Taiyuan House
18	Tsinan House
19	Shenyang House

== Demographics ==
According to the 2016 by-census, Tsuen Wan Centre had a population of 10,742. The median age was 39.6 and the majority of residents (96.9 per cent) were of Chinese ethnicity. The average household size was 2.5 people. The median monthly household income of all households (i.e. including both economically active and inactive households) was HK$30,000.

== Politics ==
Tsuen Wan Centre is located in Tsuen Wan Centre constituency of the Tsuen Wan District Council. It is currently represented by Li Hung-por, who was elected in the 2019 elections.
