= Tsuen King Garden =

Housing estate in Tsuen Wan, Hong Kong

Coordinates: 22.3784°N 114.1095°E

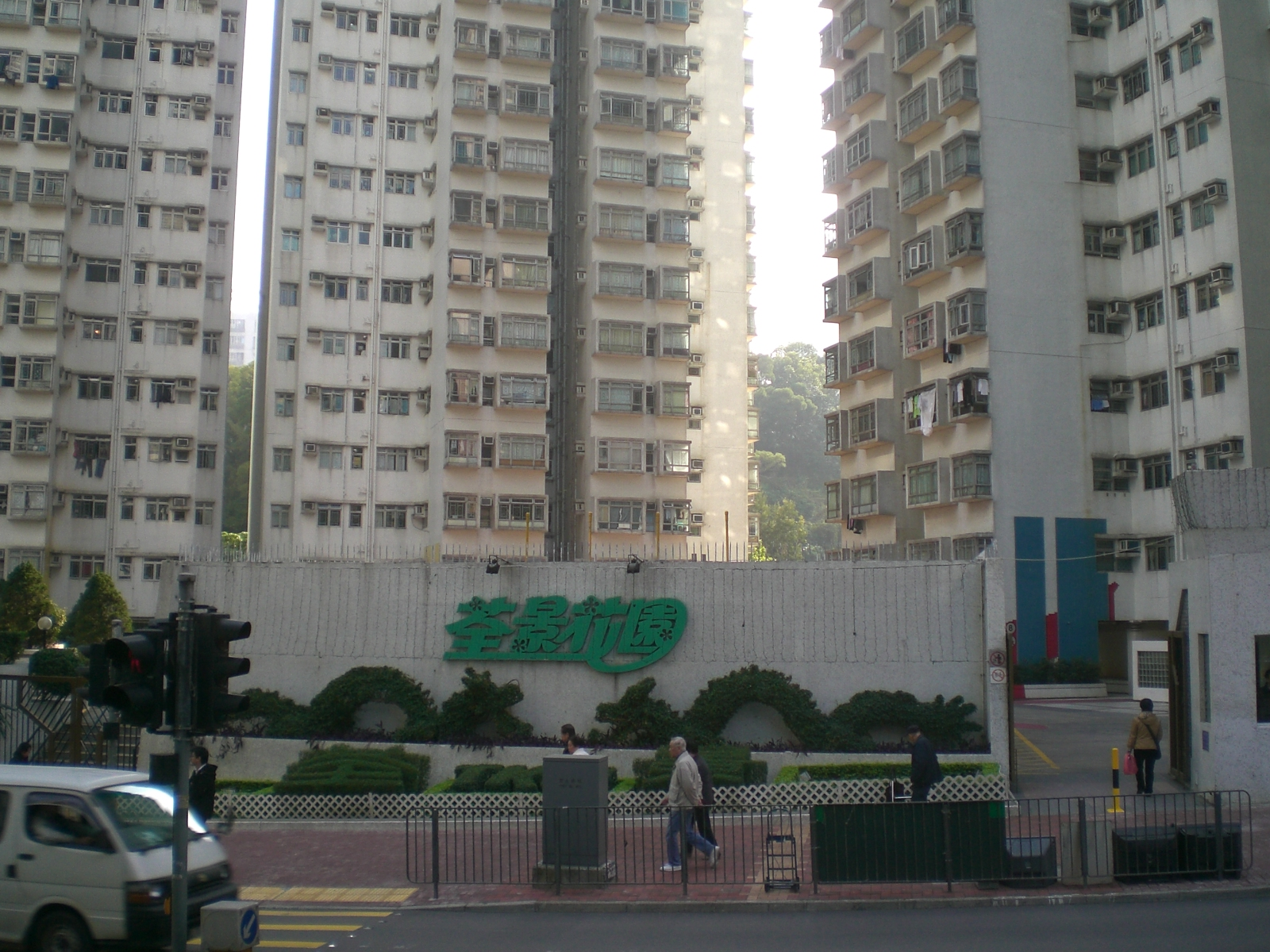
Tsuen King Garden Phase 1

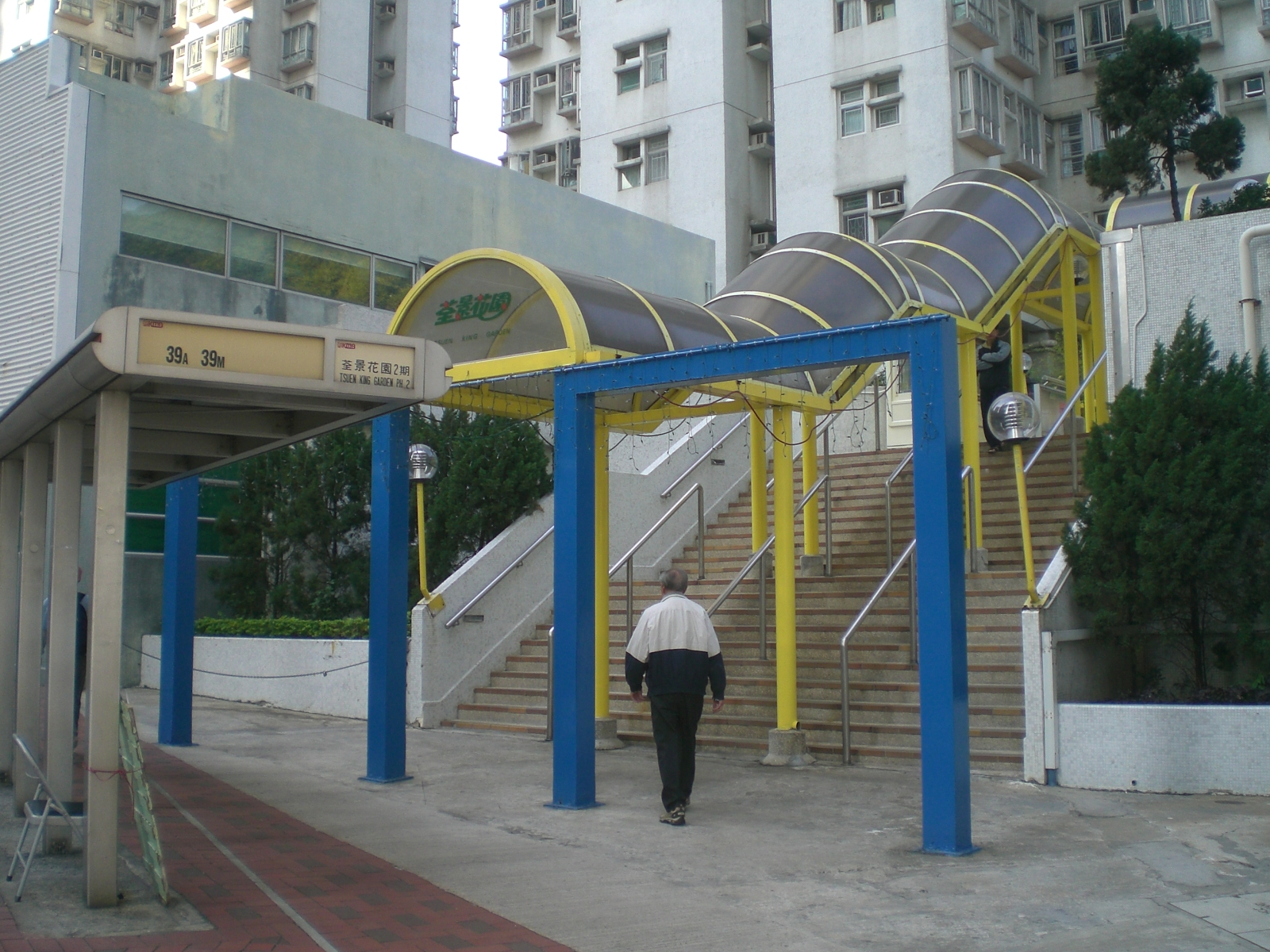
Entrance of Tsuen King Garden Phase 2

Tsuen King Garden (Chinese: 荃景花園) is one of the largest private housing estates in Tsuen Wan, New Territories, Hong Kong, located at Tsuen King Circuit. It comprises 12 high-rise buildings in two phases which were completed between 1987 and 1988, and was developed by Sun Hung Kai Properties.

== Demographics ==
According to the 2016 by-census, Tsuen King Garden had a population of 7,734. The median age was 42.6 and the majority of residents (95.6 per cent) were of Chinese ethnicity. The average household size was 2.7 people. The median monthly household income of all households (i.e. including both economically active and inactive households) was HK$38,000.

== Politics ==
Tsuen King Garden is located in the Discovery Park constituency of the Tsuen Wan District Council. It is currently represented by Lau Cheuk-yu, who was elected in the 2019 elections.
