= Henderson Investment =

Investment company

Henderson Investment Limited 恒基兆業發展有限公司
- Type: Listed company
- Industry: Conglomerate
- Founded: 1970; 56 years ago
- Headquarters: Hong Kong, China
- Area served: Hong Kong, China
- Key people: Chairman: Dr Lee Shau Kee Chairman: Dr Martin Lee Ka-shing
- Website: Henderson Investment Limited

Henderson Investment
- Traditional Chinese: 恒基兆業發展有限公司
- Simplified Chinese: 恒基兆业地发展限公司
Transcriptions
Standard Mandarin
- Hanyu Pinyin: Héngjīzhàoyè Fāzhǎn Yǒuxiàngōngsī
Yue: Cantonese
- Jyutping: hang4 gei1 siu6 jip6 faat3 zin2 jau5 haan6 gung1 si1

Henderson Investment Limited (Chinese: 恒基兆業發展有限公司) (SEHK: 97), the subsidiary company of Henderson Land Development, involves the development, investment and leasing of the properties in Hong Kong and Mainland China. Other activities include operations and management of department stores, investment in infrastructure projects, provision of cleaning and security guard services, and other investment holdings.

== History ==
1970: Henderson Investment was established in 1970, named Wing Tai Development Limited (Chinese: 永泰置業有限公司).

1972: It was listed on the Hong Kong Stock Exchange.

1975: Lee Shau Kee, the founder of Henderson Land Development, took control of Wing Tai.

1985: Henderson acquired control of Wing Tai, and was renamed as Henderson Investment Limited.

1988: Henderson Land spun off its other holdings and investments, which were placed into Henderson Investment.

1989: It established its department store chain, Citistore.

1992: It acquired Miramar Hotel in Kowloon.

1995: It established a security management company, Megastrength Security Services Company.

1996: It established its property management company, Well Born Real Estate Management.

1996–2005: It was one of the Hang Seng Index Constituent Stocks (blue-chip stock).

2000: It moved into the information technology sectors through a subsidiary, Henderson Cyber.

2007: Henderson Land acquired assets from Henderson Investment, mainly consisting of the stakes of Hong Kong Ferry (Holdings) Company Limited and Miramar Hotel and Investment, and later Hong Kong and China Gas.

2018: Henderson Land acquired assets from UNY (HK) Limited department store chain, UNY
