= Hotel Miramar =

Hotel Miramar may refer to:

- Hotel Miramar is the former name of The Mira Hong Kong
- Hotel Miramar (Bissau)
- Hotel Miramar (Jersey)
- Hotel Miramar (São Tomé)
- Hotel Miramar Singapore
