= Peter Lee Ka-kit =

Hong Kong businessman

Peter Lee Ka-Kit
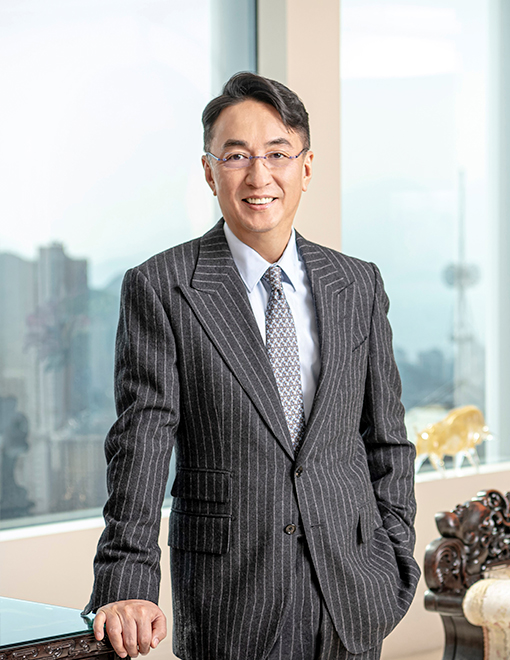

Chairman of Henderson Land Principal of Full Vision Capital
- Incumbent
- Assumed office 1997
- Preceded by: Lee Shau-kee

HK regional member of Chinese People's Political Consultative Conference
- Incumbent
- Assumed office 3 March 1998

Personal details
- Born: May 20, 1963 (age 63) British Hong Kong
- Citizenship: Hong Kong; China
- Children: 3
- Parent: Lee Shau-kee
- Relatives: Martin Lee Ka-shing (brother)
- Education: Keele University (BSc)
- Occupation: Businessman, philanthropist
- Awards: Grand Bauhinia Medal (2024); Knight of the Legion of Honour (2012); Gold Bauhinia Star

Chinese name
- Traditional Chinese: 李家傑
- Simplified Chinese: 李家杰
Transcriptions
Standard Mandarin
- Hanyu Pinyin: Li Jiajie

Peter Lee Ka Kit, GBM, GBS, JP, (born May 20, 1963), is a businessman and philanthropist from Hong Kong, the elder son of real estate tycoon and majority owner and founder of Henderson Land Development, Lee Shau-kee.

Lee is the chairman of Henderson Land Development, The Hong Kong and China Gas Company and the chairman of Towngas China. He is a member of the Standing Committee of the 14th National Committee of the CPPCC, a member of the National Committee of the CPPCC (1998-), chairman of the One Country Two Systems Research Institute, and honorary president of the Hong Kong China Friendship Association.

== Personal life ==
Born in Hong Kong in 1963, with family roots in Shunde, Guangdong, China. He was admitted to St. Paul's Primary School in 1969. Since 1977, he began attending secondary school and later, the University of London (UoL) in the UK. He graduated from the computer science department of the University of Keele in 1985. In 1985, he joined his father's company Henderson Land as an Executive Director, focusing on its mainland China business.

His father, Lee Shau-kee, born in a wealthy family in Shunde, Guangdong, his grandfather owned several gold trading shops.

== Career ==
In 1985, he joined his father's company Henderson Land as an executive director, focusing on its mainland China business. In addition to leading the mainland China business of Henderson Land. In 2014, he founded Full Vision Capital. In 2021, he launched the TERA-Award Smart Energy Innovation Competition (TERA-Award).

Lee has given support to a range of philanthropic endeavours and charities. He founded the Care for Life Foundation in 2007 to provide financial assistance and medical care to orphans and impoverished children born with defects and disabilities. He founded the Centum Charitas Foundation in 2008 to bring together second and third-generation members of Hong Kong's prominent entrepreneurial families to support philanthropic causes. He joined the Ai You Foundation, a children's welfare charity, in 2009 and is vice director. In 2026, he published “1.23%: 破幻的微光”, a book exploring humanity’s cognitive dilemma in the modern world. All royalties from the publication are donated to charitable causes.

== Awards and honours ==
- Grand Bauhinia Medal (GBM)
- Gold Bauhinia Star (GBS)
- Justice of the Peace (JP)
- Honorary Trustee of Tsinghua University
- 2009 Honorary University Fellows, the University of Hong Kong
- Chevalier de l’Ordre de la Légion d’Honneur by the French Government
- Huang Yanpei Outstanding Award from the National Association of Vocational Education of China
- Most Benevolent and Philanthropic Individual from the Ministry of Civil Affairs of the People's Republic of China
- Honorary Doctorate of Laws from The Hang Seng University of Hong Kong
