= Citistore =

Hong Kong department store company

Citistore (Hong Kong) Limited 千色(香港)有限公司
- Company type: Privately owned company
- Industry: Department store
- Founded: 1989
- Headquarters: Hong Kong, China
- Area served: Hong Kong
- Parent: Henderson Land Development
- Website: Citistore

Citistore (Hong Kong) Limited (Chinese: 千色(香港)有限公司) or Citistore (Chinese: 千色Citistore) is a department store company in Hong Kong. It is a wholly owned subsidiary of Henderson Land Development, a flagship enterprise owned by Dr. Lee Shau Kee. Established in 1989, it has branches in Tsuen Wan, Yuen Long, Ma On Shan, Tseung Kwan O and Tuen Mun. The main customers of Citistore are young people in middle income group.

While Henderson Land Development Co. witnessed a gain of 1.9 percent on Sep 2014. The company has plans of selling the Citistore retail franchise.

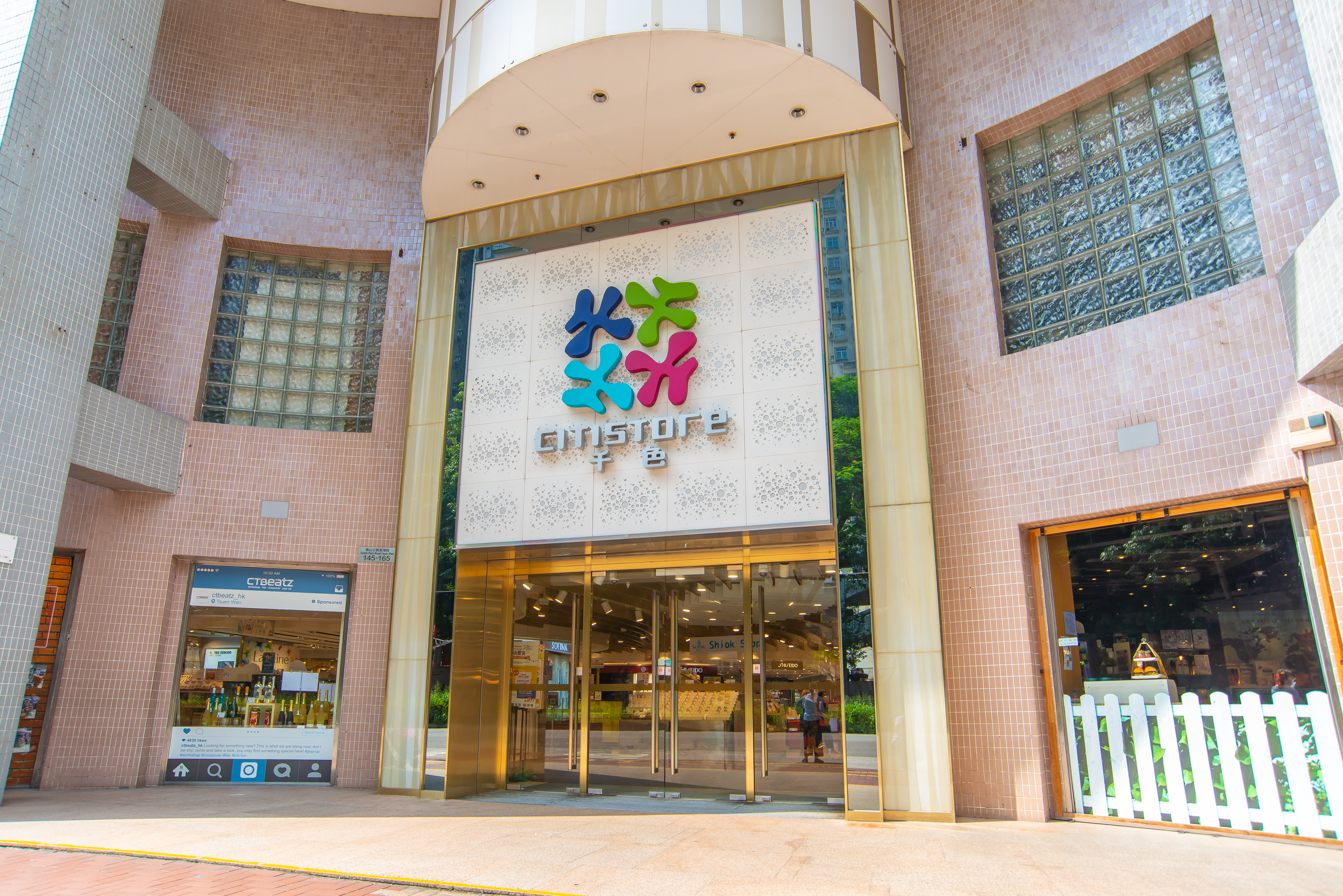
Tsuen Wan Citistore Branch

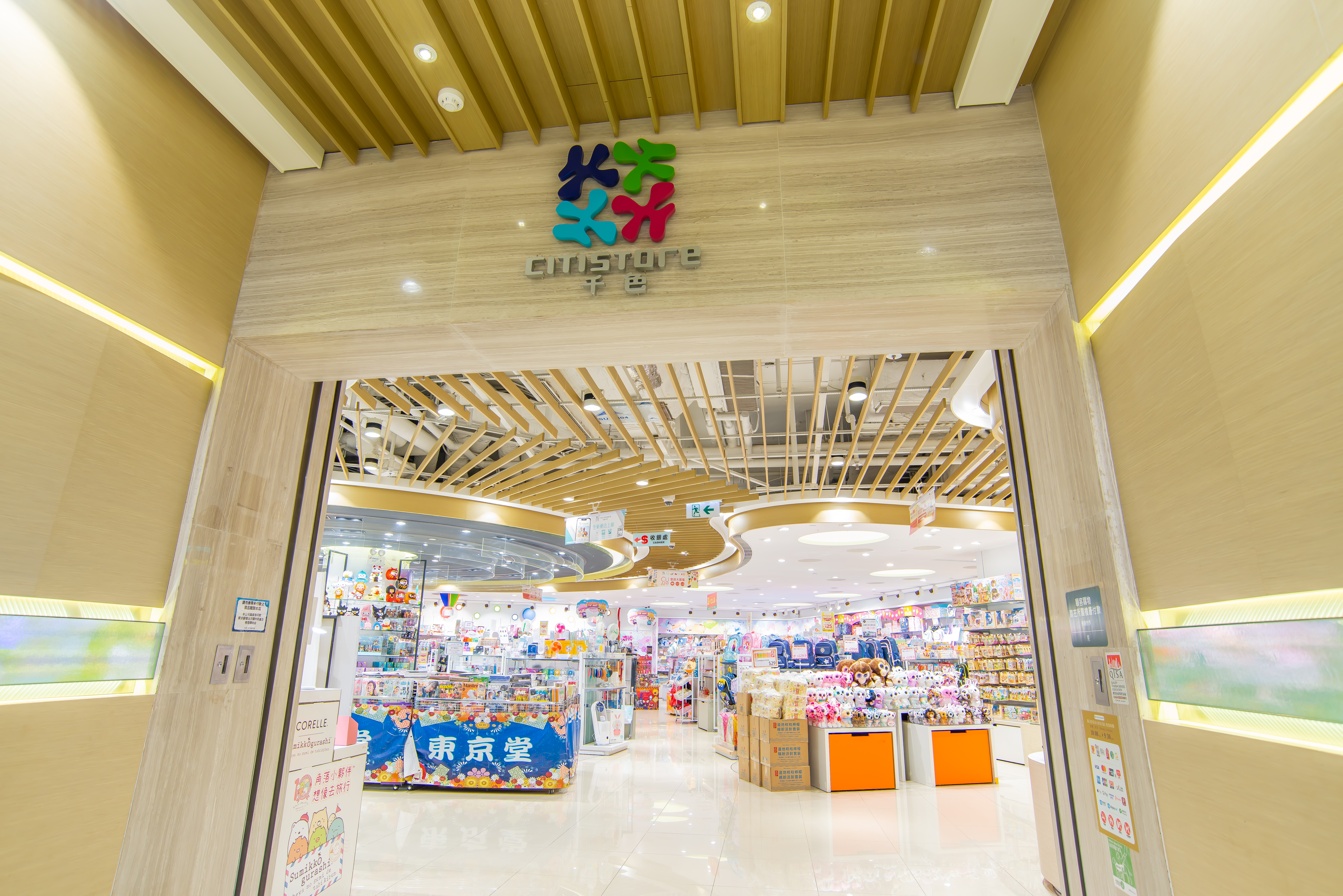
Yuen Long Citistore Branch

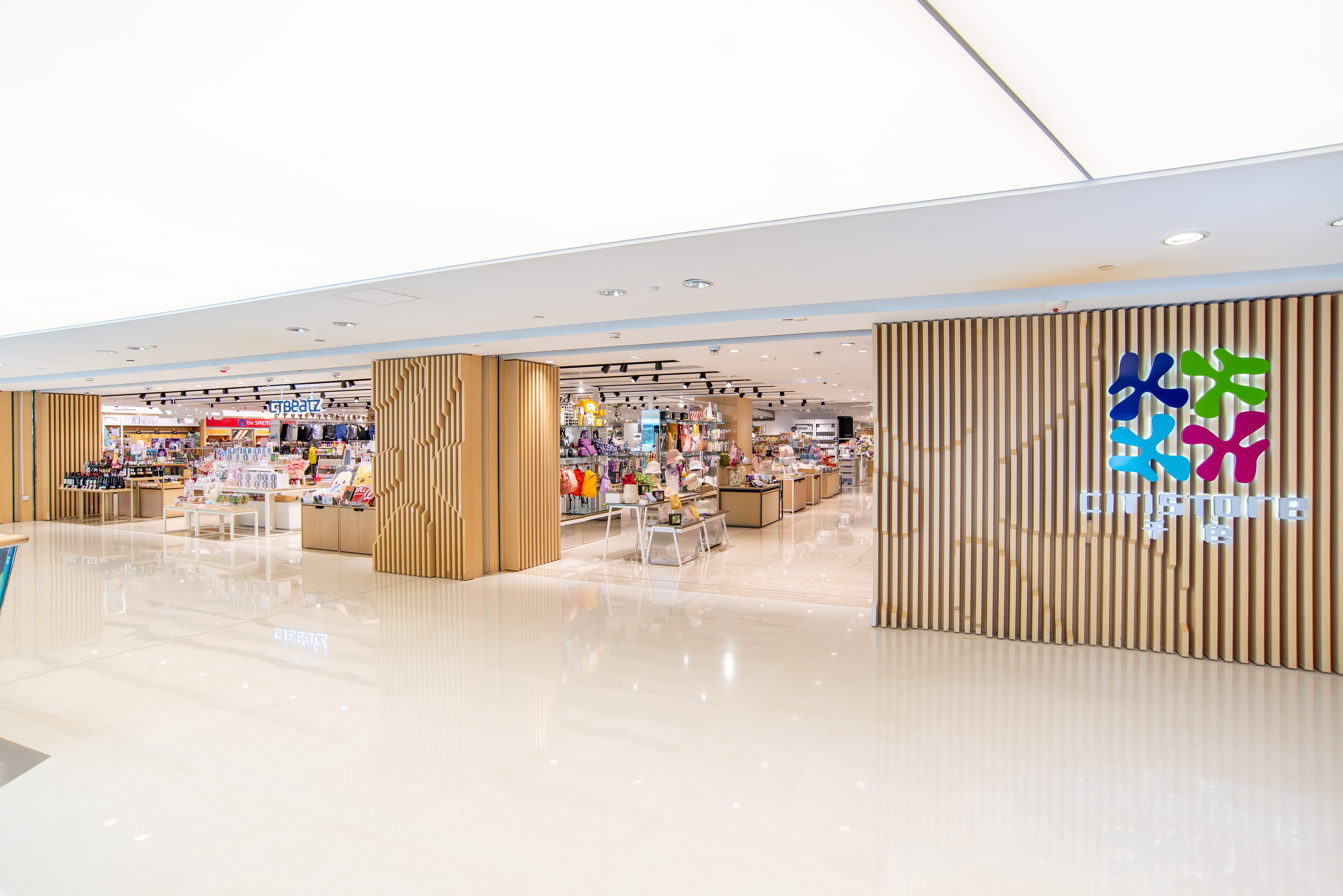
Ma On Shan Citistore Branch

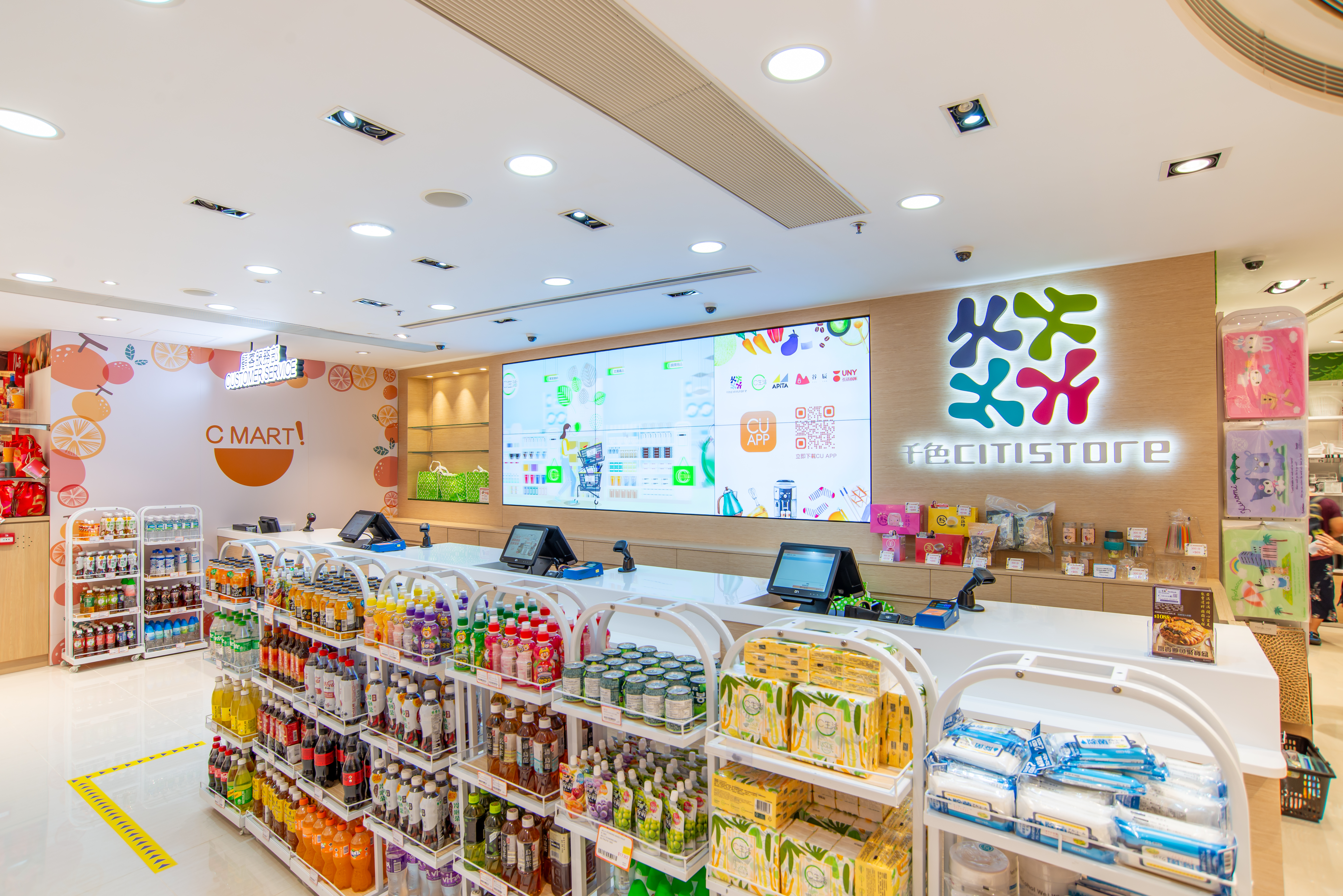
Tseung Kwan O Citistore Branch

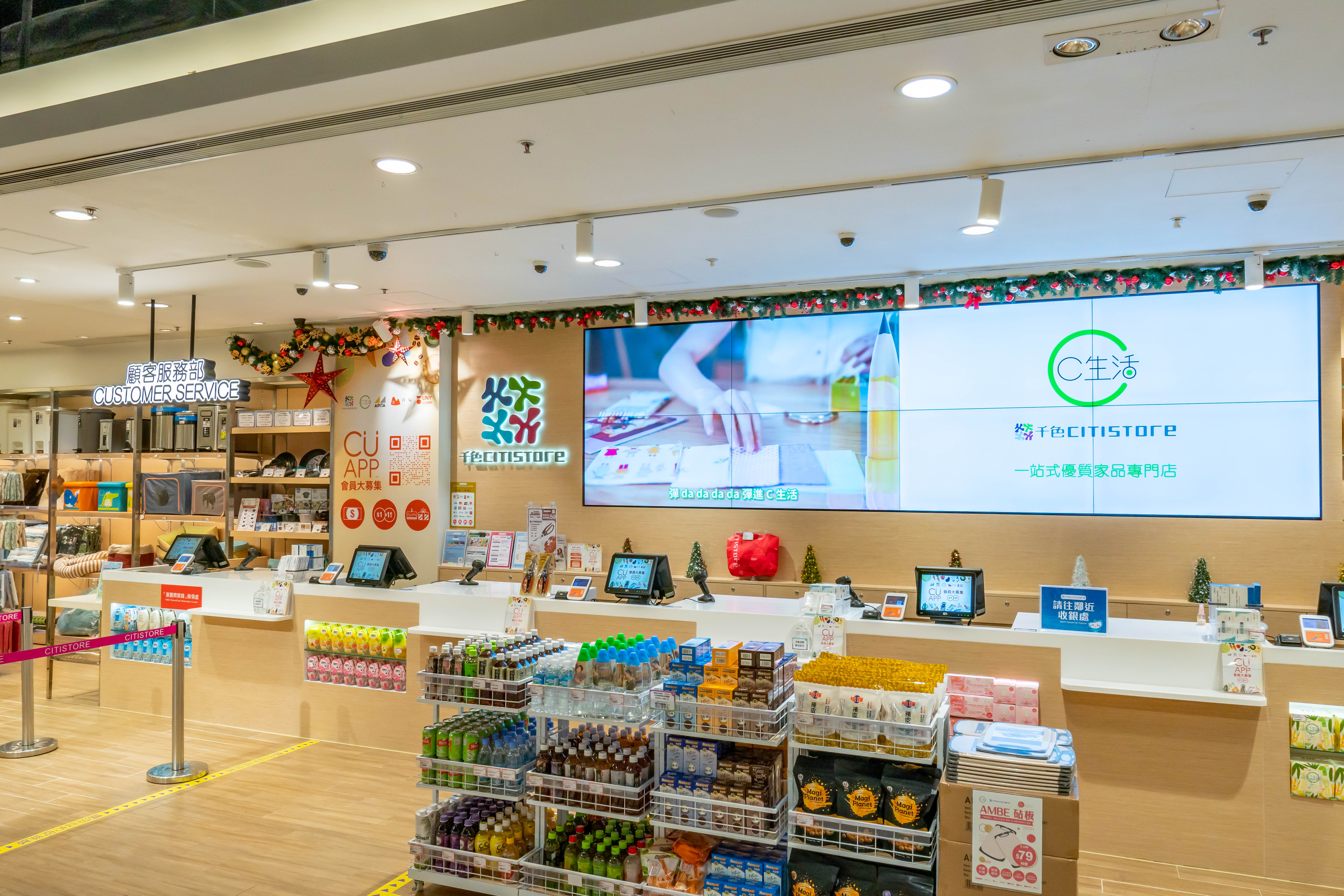
Tuen Mun Citistore Branch
