= Shaanxi Yanchang Petroleum =

Chinese petroleum conglomerate

Shaanxi Yanchang Petroleum Group Co. Ltd.
- Type: Government Owned Entity
- Industry: Oil and Gas
- Founded: 1905
- Headquarters: Xi'an, Shaanxi, China
- Area served: People's Republic of China
- Products: Petroleum, Petrochemical, Natural Gas
- Services: Petroleum and Natural Gas
- Subsidiaries: Shaanxi Yanchang International Group, Novus Energy Group
- Website: www.sxycpc.com

Shaanxi Yanchang Petroleum Group is a Chinese conglomerate mainly engaged in the exploration, production, transportation, and sale of petroleum and natural gas, and in addition the production and sales of petrochemical products. Founded in 1905, it is the fourth largest oil producer in the country. Almost all its reserves and refineries are located in Shaanxi.

== General Information ==
=== History ===
Yanchang was founded in 1905 in Shaanxi province in China, and was recorded as the first oil enterprise in China. In 1907, Yanchang Oil Plant was the first Chinese company to drill an oil well, also known as 'Yanyi Well' in China, and built the first refinery to refine crude oil into commercially refined lamp oil that is "comparable to the imported lamp oil [sic)]." In 1935, Yanchang Oil Plant was acquired by the Workers' and Peasants' Red Army of China. The result of the acquisition was the production of gasoline, paraffin, candle, wax sheets, gun polishing oil, and Vaseline; these products were used in large by the People's Liberation Army (PLA) of China to assist in the Second World War against the invading Japanese Army. Owing to the heavy demand in these products, Yanchang became an important institution in the 'liberation of China' especially in the provinces of Shaanxi, Gansu, and Ningxia.

From the second World War until modern day China, Yanchang remained a small enterprise, focused on regional development. Its small enterprising strategy to operate regionally caused it to grow at a slower pace than other oil companies especially when China started becoming economically competitive globally. Oil companies like PetroChina, Sinopec, and Sinochem outgrew Yanchang and as a result Yanchang became uncompetitive domestically. This saw a period of stagnation in the development and growth of Yanchang. In 1998, Yanchang Petroleum Industry Group was founded as a result of stagnation, and in 2005, was named Yanchang Petroleum (Group) Co. Ltd to emphasize the growth of the company and a roadmap for large-scale developmental projects both domestically and globally to better compete with other domestic oil companies. Currently, Yanchang consistently ranks in the top 10 largest oil companies in China.

=== Corporate Culture ===
YanChang Petroleum Group developed its corporate strategy using the concept of "Three Root, Three Reliance, and Three Propellants".

The "Three Root" strategy is three pronged in nature and focuses on the core business. The first "root" is the focus on the exploration, exploitation, and processing of both oil and natural gas. The second "root" is to establish a foothold in Shaanxi Province, by building research and industrial parks, and expanding development to other regions. The third "root" is to establish a strong foothold in China and to expand operations in foreign markets and be a key oil industry competitor on the global stage.

The "Three Reliance" strategy is also three pronged and focuses on corporate independence. The first "Reliance" is to be consistent in research and development and continually undertake large projects. The second "Reliance" is to increase its competency in technology and become self-reliant on key innovations. The third "Reliance" is to stimulate profitability and economic benefit by smart and efficient management.

Finally, the "Three Propellants" strategy is also three pronged and focuses on pushing innovative boundaries. The first "Propellant" is to encourage "thinking outside the box" and to promote creative ideas. The second "Propellant" is to constantly upgrade key assets and achieve environmentally sustainable but efficient production methods. The third "Propellant" is to continuously nurture cooperation between the company and government.

=== Shaanxi Oil Incident Protest ===
In the 1970s and 1980s, oil fields in Shaanxi Province were not productive and considered an economic liability to the province due to financial losses incurred by high maintenance costs and lack of production. These circumstances forced the provincial government to recruit counties and their respective lower-level governments to form and run oil companies affiliated with SYPRB (Shaanxi Yanchang Petroleum Resources Bureau). The local ownership of oil fields in Shaanxi Province by counties and their locally run oil production companies did not curb the low production levels of oil and by 1994, forced the SYPRB to call on outside investment, both from private investors and the state government. The Changqing branch of the state government owned CNPC (China National Petroleum Corporation) signed an agreement called "Agreement on Northern Shaanxi Oil Resource Development" also known as the "4/13 Agreement." The agreement states that counties with the lack of financial resources or technology can seek state government signed contracts or form joint ventures with private investors.

The "4/13 Agreement" saw major growth in oil production capabilities of Shaanxi Province. The three main contributors to the oil boom were CNPC's Changqing Branch in collaboration with the SYPRB, local county oil companies affiliated with the SYPRB, and private investors that directly injected capital in local county oil companies. In 1999, the Shaanxi provincial government dismissed a legal document called the "1239 Document", which is an order for the provincial government to surrender oil assets to the state-owned CNPC. The Shaanxi provincial government instead allowed more private investment in 2000. The defiance of the Shaanxi provincial government towards the state government and the CNPC led to the negotiation between the CNPC and private investors to take over county-owned oil companies without the Shaanxi provincial government's consent.

In 2003, the Shaanxi provincial government launched its oil field seizure campaign. The seizure campaign saw the immediate cessation of joint ventures and production contracts with private investors. This led to a period of kidnappings and arrests of private investors who resisted and violently protested against the seizure. The seized oil fields were re-incorporated into the locally owned county run oil companies without consent by private investors. The private investors did not surrender and resorted to peaceful protests, filing legal litigations, petitions, and public campaigns against the Shaanxi provincial government. Losses incurred by private investors including the loss of property in addition to legal fees amounted to 7 billion Chinese Yuan valued at US$843 million using the rate at the end of year 2003 around the time at which the events occurred. Two case filings were submitted to the Shaanxi Supreme Court twice, and were twice rejected. In 2005, the Shaanxi provincial government announced the formation of Shaanxi Yanchang Petroleum Group, owned and operated under the supervision of the Shaanxi provincial government.

== Corporate Structure ==
=== Organizational structure ===
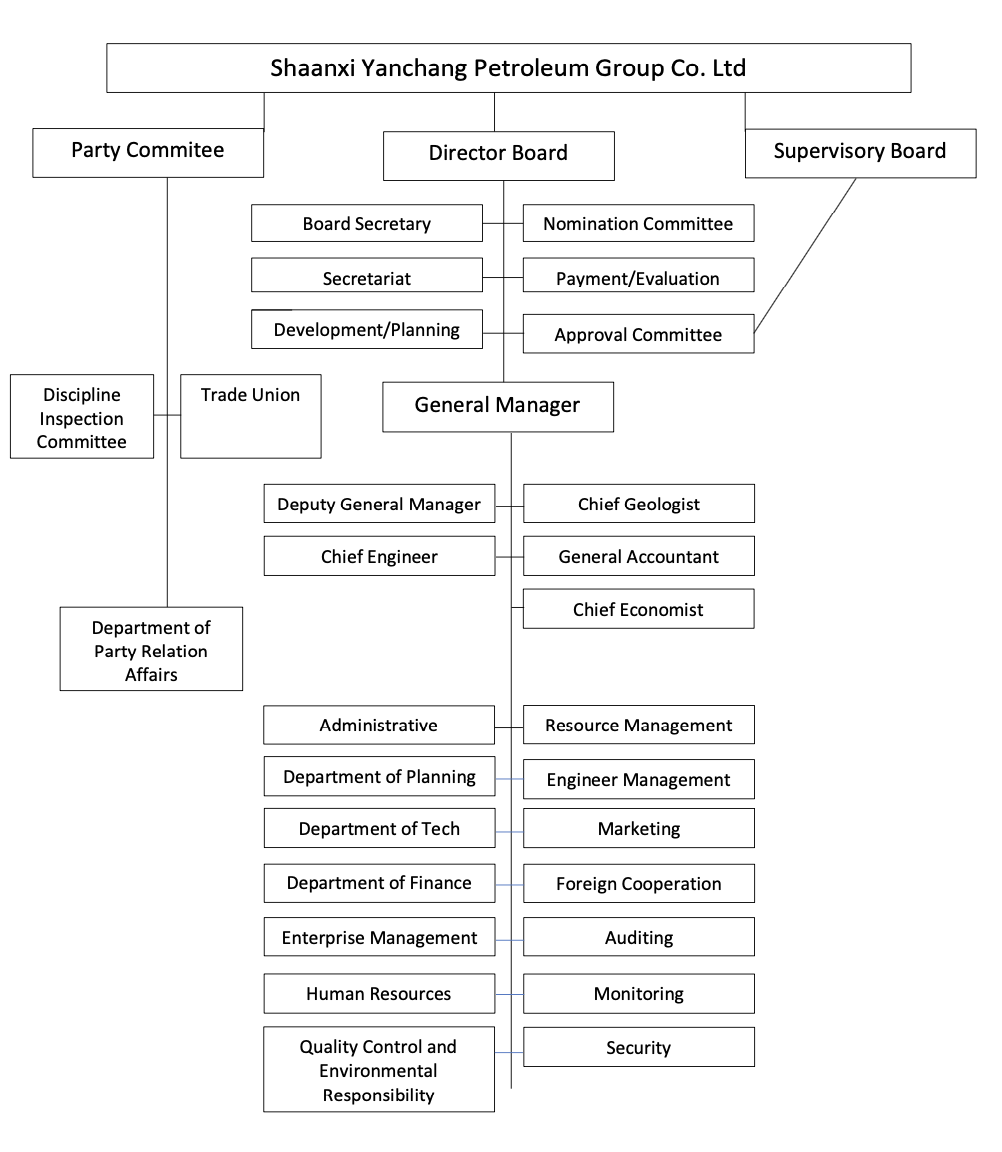

=== Global Operations ===
Currently, Yanchang has global operations due to its expansion and acquisitions of global oil companies. Yanchang also has a subsidiary company that is listed in the Hong Kong Stock Exchange called Yanchang Petroleum International Limited that is responsible for global operations and global acquisitions. In 2014, Yanchang acquired a Canadian-based oil petrochemical company called Novus Energy Inc.

== Corporate Growth ==
=== Financial Growth ===
The domestic and global operations of Yanchang have grown in size and capital assets due to its global expansion efforts and multibillion-dollar acquisitions. A major event in the growth of Yanchang can be attributed to the acquisition of Novus, at 230 million Canadian dollars. This acquisition has been vital because it establishes an international footprint for Yanchang and allows Yanchang to extract oil in a foreign market.

Within the last decade, Yanchang has gone through a period of growth and rapid decline. According to the source provided by Simply Wall Street, as of mid 2016, Yanchang has reported a record revenue of 23.74 billion Hong Kong dollars. However, there was a rapid decline in 2018 at a record low revenue of 4.09 billion Hong Kong dollars with a record loss in earnings of 146.72 million Hong Kong dollars. Geopolitical uncertainty coupled with highly volatile oil prices played a major role in the decline of oil prices globally which adversely affected high capacity oil production companies in China.

As of 2019, with start of the COVID-19 pandemic, oil prices have dropped to a record low in global markets. As an oil producing company, Yanchang will see either stagnated or negative growth, but as with all major oil producing companies in China, will be fiscally supported by government bailouts to ensure the company does not fall into insolvency.

=== Competition and Federal Government Support ===
In a report published in 2005, the largest oil and gas producers in China that are in direct competition with Yanchang Petroleum Group are China Petroleum and Chemical Corporation (Sinopec), China National Petroleum Corporation (CNPC) operating with its most recognized subsidiaries Sinopec and PetroChina, China National Offshore Oil Corporation (CNOOC) and Sinochem Group.

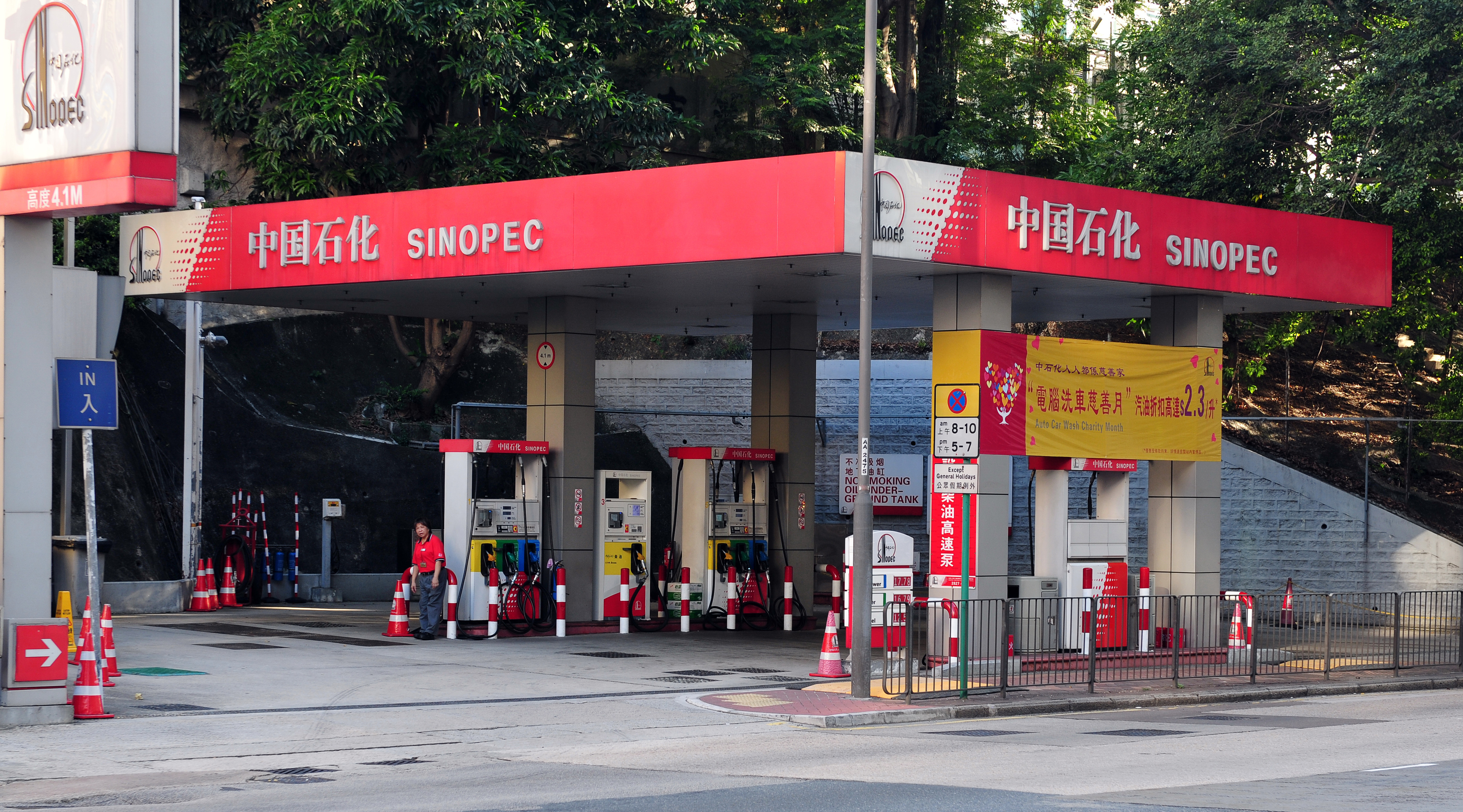
Sinopec is one of China's largest petroleum companies.

Sinopec, CNPC, and CNOOC are state owned companies. Currently, Sinopec, CNPC, and CNOON are listed in one of more of three major global stock indices, namely the NYSE, Shanghai Stock Index, and Hong Kong stock exchange.

Yanchang Petroleum Group is currently controlled by the provincial government and only has provincial support. This limiting factor is the reason why Yanchang Petroleum Group does not have the financial resources to expand its production as aggressively as the other state owned companies. During the COVID-19 pandemic, oil companies around the world has suffered catastrophic losses, and Yanchang Petroleum Group is not immune to the downturn of the global oil market. The health of Yanchang Petroleum Group is currently unknown due to limited information and strict news censorship of the state government regarding economic and industrial health.

== Major Projects ==
=== Domestic Projects ===
Yanchang has predominantly focused its oil exploration and exploitation efforts in Shaanxi province in China. However, with its stagnation until the early 2000s Yanchang strategized a roadmap to grow its business nationally and internationally. The most recent large-scale project being undertaken by Yanchang is "Enhanced Oil Recovery Using CO2 in North West China."

This project will focus on the exploration efforts of Yanchang in the Ordos Basin, the second largest sedimentary basin, that covers an area of 370,000 square kilometers encompassing parts of three provinces (Shaanxi, Gansu, and Shanxi) in China. This project is undertaken as an effort by Yanchang to increase oil exploitation by lowering costs and using "Innovation and Green" methods to tackle climate change.

=== International Projects ===
Since Yanchang Petroleum Group's operations overhaul effort in the 1990s, it has been actively acquiring foreign petroleum companies to develop its international presence. In the 2010s Shaanxi Yanchang Petroleum Group a few large acquisitions, namely Novus Energy of Canada, and Sino Union Energy Investment Corporation of Hong Kong.

In 2010, Yanchang Petroleum Group successfully acquired 15% of Sino Union Energy Investment Corporation (Sunpec). The price of the 15% acquisition has not been announced and is therefore unknown. This acquisition will allow Yanchang to exploit hydrocarbon resources in Madagascar, which is located in two oil fields that is currently owned and operated by Sunpec. According to an international evaluation agency and Yanchang, the combination of both oil fields will yield in excess of 5.6 billion barrels of oil and 66.24 million cubic meters of natural gas. As of 2007, Sunpec owns 30 years of oil production and 35 years of natural gas production in Madagascar, with the contract starting in 2007.

In 2014, Yanchang Petroleum Group successfully acquired another major oil producer in Canada, Novus Energy. This acquisition totalled US$320 million inclusive of net debt and all transaction costs, priced at 1.18 CAD per share, a 40-cent premium over the previous close price. Novus Energy is based in Calgary Canada, and is considered a 'junior' oil and gas production company. The structure of this acquisition is the parent company, Shaanxi Yanchang Petroleum Group acquired Novus Energy via Canada listed subsidiary called Yanchang Canada, owned by a Hong Kong listed subsidiary, Yanchang Petroleum International, which is owned by Shaanxi Yanchang Petroleum Group. Novus Energy Group operated in Saskatchewan, Canada, and has 166 thousand acres of undeveloped land in which 4000 barrels of oil, natural gas liquids, and natural gas are produced daily.

=== Disasters ===
In July 2010, Yanchang Petroleum Group experienced a gas leak at one of its gas fields in Shaanxi Province. 1000 villagers and workers from 5 separate villages and Qilicun town were evacuated to avoid any casualties. The gas leak was caused by both nitrogen sulfide and carbon monoxide. According to the county government official, "villagers said they could feel the heat 200 meters away from the site."

Another major incident occurred in October 2019. A major explosion occurred at one of Yanchang Petroleum Group's drilling plants. There were 5 casualties, 5 injured and 3 others missing. The reason for this incident according to investigators was caused by the testing of a new method of drilling using thermal technology that would increase oil or natural gas output. The incident took place 40 km east of Yan'an city in Shaanxi Province, and is considered one of the oldest plants in China. After the report of the incident, the provincial government could not be contacted for additional comment and it is currently unclear if the plant is still operational.

== Operations ==
- Cameroon: In April 2009, Yan Chang Logone Development Holding Company Ltd., a subsidiary of Yanchang inked a production sharing agreement with the state oil company of Cameroon, Societe Nationale des Hydrocarbures. Under the terms, Yanchang will explore and drill one exploration well in the Zina and Makary blocks of the Logone Birni basin, located far north, near N'Djamena, Chad. Total S.A. also considered such an agreement but was squeamish about the political risk.
- Madagascar: The company acquired a 15% stake in 2010 in Sino Union Energy Investment (Sunpec) which controls four oil exploration blocks in Madagascar. Back in 2008, Yanchang had agreed to a joint venture with Sunpec and Towngas to develop block 3113 with technical assistance from Yunnan Kaiyuan Oil and Gas. The venture was success leading to the discovery of light oil in November 2009. This block along with block 2104 have estimated oil reserves of 5.6 billion barrels and natural gas reserves of 66 billion cubic meters.
