= Towngas China =

Towngas Smart Energy Company Limited 港華智慧能源有限公司
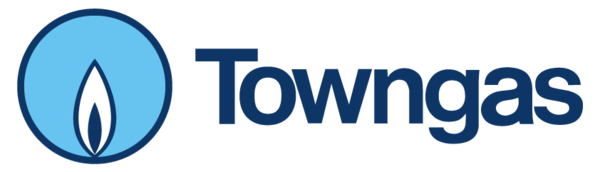
- Company type: Listed company
- Traded as: HSEX:1083HK Hang Seng Index
- Industry: Natural gas
- Founded: 2000
- Headquarters: Quarry Bay, Hong Kong, China
- Area served: Mainland China, Hong Kong
- Key people: Chairman: Peter Lee Ka-kit, preceded by Mr. Alfred Chan
- Products: Energy business, green power, digitalization in power systems
- Revenue: HKD 12.83 billion (2020)
- Parent: Hong Kong and China Gas
- Website: Towngas Smart Energy

Towngas China
- Simplified Chinese: 港华燃气有限公司
- Traditional Chinese: 港華燃氣有限公司
Transcriptions
Standard Mandarin
- Hanyu Pinyin: Gǎnghuá Ránqì Yǒuxiàn Gōngsī

Towngas Smart Energy Company Limited (SEHK: 1083), formerly Towngas China Company Limited (Chinese: 港華燃氣有限公司), formerly Panva Gas Holdings Limited (百江燃氣有限公司), is a natural gas distribution and smart energy businesses in mainland China, Hong Kong, etc. It principally engaged in the sales and distribution of piped gas including the provision of piped gas, construction of Gas pipelines, the operation of city-gas pipeline networks, the operation of gas fuel automobile refilling station, and the sale of gas household appliance.

In 2006, Hong Kong and China Gas acquired 44% of shares of Panva Gas and became the largest shareholder of Panva Gas. In 2007, the company was renamed, becoming Towngas China Company Limited.

== See also ==
- Energy in Hong Kong
