= Verax (film) =

2013 Hong Kong short film

- Directed by: Jeff Floro, Edwin Lee, Shawn Tse, Marcus Tsui
- Written by: Edwin Lee, Marcus Tsui
- Produced by: Jeff Floro, Edwin Lee, Shawn Tse, Marcus Tsui
- Starring: Andrew Cromeek, Thomas Easterling, Gabe Ostley, Robert Hinson, Edwin Chin, Justin Lau, Cindy Wong, Simon Zeng Hao, Shi Yi Ng, Guo Aibing
- Cinematography: Jeff Floro, Shawn Tse
- Edited by: Edwin Lee
- Music by: Gareth Coker, Thomas Vo
- Production companies: J.Shot Videos, Fallout Media, Immortal Peach
- Distributed by: YouTube
- Release date: 25 June 2013
- Running time: 5.5 minutes
- Country: Hong Kong
- Languages: English, Cantonese, Mandarin
- Budget: HKD $5000

Verax is a five-minute 2013 short film about the Edward Snowden leaking event in Hong Kong. Produced by amateur filmmakers in Hong Kong, it was posted to YouTube in June 2013. The name of the film originates from Snowden's codename for himself, which means "truth teller" in Latin. It was produced by the group J.Shot Videos. According to the producers, this was the first film ever produced about Snowden.

== Plot ==
The film has four parts. The first depicts Central Intelligence Agency employees discussing the Snowden case. The second involves a newspaper journalist corresponding with Snowden. The third involves Hong Kong police officers and Chinese Ministry of State Security employees discussing and trying to find Edward Snowden. The fourth involves the characters waiting for Snowden to appear, and when Snowden reveals himself in the media. The end of the film includes extracts of Snowden's interview with The Guardian. The final captions state that Snowden departed Hong Kong on 23 June. The film features The Mira, the Hong Kong hotel where Snowden stayed. A Rubik's Cube, an item which, according to the Agence France-Presse, "Snowden reportedly used to identify himself to a Guardian journalist," is featured in the film. Marcus Tsui, one of the project's filmmakers, described the film as a "snapshot in time".

Andreas Wiseman of Screen Daily wrote that the plot uses "a large degree of creative licence".

== Conception and motives ==
The film was created by expatriates from Australia, Canada, Ireland, and the United States. The producers of the film were Jeff Floro, Edwin Lee (Note: Chinese: 李健恩; Jyutping: lei5 gin6 jan1; pinyin: Lǐ Jiànēn), Shawn Tse (Note: traditional Chinese: 謝兆龍; simplified Chinese: 谢兆龙; Jyutping: ze6 siu6 lung4; pinyin: Xiè Zhàolóng), and Marcus Tsui (Note: 崔正傑; 崔正杰; ceoi1 zing3 git6; Cuī Zhèngjié). Lee, an Irish citizen, and the sole professional filmmaker involved, served as the editor and cinematographer. Lee had served as a journalist in the multimedia and television sectors and had worked for the South China Morning Post and ATV Home. On 11 July 2013, two days after Snowden revealed his identity, Edwin Lee had contacted his friends on the possibility of making a film. Lee and Tsui created the film's script, and did so one day before shooting. The actors had no time to rehearse their lines.

According to the producers, the film was intended to be an homage to Hong Kong. Lee said "We were so intrigued as to why Snowden came to Hong Kong. All of us love Hong Kong to death; we all call Hong Kong home." The filmmakers, on the group YouTube page, stated "While nearly every media outlet wanted to get their hands on him, we decided to produce a short fiction video to depict his experience in HK, and how it would have affected certain parties. Namely, the CIA contingent based in HK who would be tasked to find Snowden. The Hong Kong police who would be stuck in between the U.S. and China, and the journalists who want to get the scoop." Lee said that the film was created "to catch onto the interest on Snowden and the attention on Hong Kong." According to Tse, a then 28-year-old native of Toronto, Ontario and a graduate of the York University film studies programme who worked as a teacher in Hong Kong, "We tried to give Hong Kong the limelight we think it deserves." Tse said that the group had initially considered an outright comedy, a spoof, or a thriller in the style of Jason Bourne; ultimately they opted for a depiction of the events that may have unfolded. Lee said that the Bourne film series and the works of director Michael Mann had inspired him.

In regards to Snowden's presence, the filmmakers stated that while Snowden is "a central character, he is not the most prominent. It is more about the maelstrom of events surrounding him." This was because they knew too little about Snowden himself to give him a more prominent role in the story. Lee said that the film focuses more on the "vignettes" than on Snowden and that Snowden serves as a catalyst for events that affect the other characters. Snowden himself has no live dialogue in the film. Lee said that half of the film's focus was on Hong Kong, and half was on Snowden.

The four filmmakers stated that they had no political motives. Shawn Tse said that "We knew right from the get-go that this film was going to be as neutral as possible and in a way try not to infringe upon basically what we thought Snowden was trying to do, because really we had no idea." Lee described the film as a "snapshot in time" and said that "When Snowden popped up in Hong Kong he got so much attention that it really got people talking. We wanted to give an alternative view on the situation, beyond the media chase for where he was and what he knew." Cassandra Chan, who served as the associate producer, said "The US government has abused the internet, so our response is to use the power of the internet, for hopefully good reasons."

Dean Napolitano of The Wall Street Journal wrote that the film "makes subtle observations about Hong Kong's sometimes tense relationship with mainland China and the "one country, two systems" policy – underscored in a scene where a security official from China's central government barks orders to Hong Kong police officers." During the aforementioned scene, the official from the Mainland speaks Mandarin while the Hong Kong officials speak Cantonese. According to Napolitano, the film implies that the Chinese authorities have the real power in Hong Kong. Lee stated that the scene was "vehicle to represent (Hong Kong's) relationship with China" and, as paraphrased by Alexis Lai of CNN, "the murkiness of Beijing's role in the Snowden affair." In regards to the scene, Lee said "To say China wasn't pulling any strings at all would be naïve ... Even though it gives us autonomy, it's always Beijing that calls the shots." Officially officials from the Mainland government said that they did not influence the decisions of the Hong Kong authorities.

By 1 July 2013 Edwin Lee said that because Snowden left Hong Kong, there are no plans to write a sequel. By 29 July 2013, the filmmakers had plans to show their film at film festivals, and considered making a sequel.

== Filming and monetary costs ==
The film was shot in three, or four days. At the time of shooting, Snowden was hiding within Hong Kong. By the end of the film production, Snowden had fled to Russia. Edwin Lee said that this quickened the editing process so the film could be released sooner, but that it did not shorten the project itself. Agence France-Presse stated that the film "stayed true to the actual locations in Hong Kong where Snowden was reportedly seen." Some scenes were shot at The Mira Hotel. Several office interiors were used for other scenes. A lingerie company let the filmmakers use their offices.

Edwin Lee, one of the filmmakers said that the filming style was "a lot of adrenaline... it was all very guerilla filmmaking style." He also stated that "It was foot-on-the-gas filmmaking." Lee described the filming style as a "docu-drama recreation." Napolitano said that "In some ways it resembles a modern Hong Kong crime drama, with its technical dialogue in sterile conference rooms, time-lapse photography, and sweeping aerial shots of the city's famous skyline." Jonathan DeHart of The Diplomat stated that the usage of time-lapse-style footage of grey clouds, the Hong Kong panoramas, and the "shaky cam" style are features of "spy" genre films. The film used original photography with the exception of two stock photography shots purchased from Pond5.

As of 28 June 2013 the filmmakers had not yet determined the total cost of the film. Their estimate of the budget was about $5,000 Hong Kong dollars ($641 US dollars). The AFP said that this budget was "shoestring". Patrick Frater of Variety stated on 1 June 2013 that the total cost was $4,200 HKD ($550 US). Adam Withnall of The Belfast Telegraph said that the budget was $645 U.S. dollars or about £420 British pounds. A one-night stay at The Mira was the most expensive single item in the budget, and made up about one third of the budget. The filmmakers stated that they did not make the film to gain a return on their investment, and Jeff Floro, who works in finance as a day job, said that he lost money on the film.

Dean Napolitano of The Wall Street Journal wrote that "The film is not quite a "Saturday Night Live"-style spoof, but neither is it a slick thriller given its cast of non-actors and micro budget." Rebecca Keegan of the Los Angeles Times stated that Verax "feels quite polished for an insta-film" due to the presence of electronic music soundtrack that she likens to the soundtrack of The Social Network, the "sweeping views of Hong Kong skyscrapers" and the shots within The Mira Hotel. Keegan added that "the actors' leaden delivery sometimes gives their neophyte status away." Patrick Frater of Variety said that the film had "strong production values, driving music and somewhat more amateurish acting performances." Alexis Lai of CNN said that the film "is surprisingly suspenseful and sophisticated, with gorgeous time-lapse panoramas of the city and "shaky cam" shots reminiscent of Hollywood."

== Cast ==
The cast of the film consisted of friends of the four filmmakers. Dean Napolitano of The Wall Street Journal said that the cast had "varying degrees of thespian abilities". Andrew Cromeek, a 25-year-old American from Chester, New York who was an English teacher, took the role as Snowden. He had previously acted in one commercial and one student film. The filmmakers had reviewed any friends of theirs who they believed "remotely" appeared similar to Snowden. Shawn Tse said that he looked at all of his Caucasian (White) friends to see who could play Snowden. Cromeek worked at a company where Tse worked as a teacher. Tse believed that Cromeek was "going to be perfect" for Snowden while Cromeek believed that he had "zero resemblance" to Snowden.

According to Tse, he let Cromeek grow his beard out for several days before taking him to a Hong Kong barbershop. Cromeek gave the hairstylist a photograph of Snowden and received a haircut for 50 Hong Kong dollars (US$6.41). According to Tse the Hong Kong hairstylist warned Cromeek to be careful about being mistaken for Snowden. Cromeek then lightened his haircolor by using gold spray paint, put on eyeglasses, trimmed his beard, and on the day of the shooting had moles placed on his neck with makeup. The film team also used a special wardrobe to make Cromeek appear like Snowden. Cromeek reported that his parents, family members, and friends gave him telephone calls after the film was made public.

Cast list:

- Edward Snowden – Andrew Cromeek
- Central Intelligence Agency Station Chief Carl Hamilton – Thomas Easterling
- CIA Analyst Owen Fielding – Gabe Ostley
- CIA Operations Manager – Robert Hinson
- Hong Kong Police Force (HKPF) Security Wing officer Tsang Tak-long (Note: traditional Chinese: 曾德龍; simplified Chinese: 曾德龙; Jyutping: Zang1 Dak1 Lung4; pinyin: Zēng Délóng) – Edwin Chin (Note: 錢尚文; 钱尚文; Cin4 Soeng6 Man4; Qián Shàngwén)
- HKPF Security Wing officer Vincent Lee (Note: 李達志; 李达志; Lei5 Daat6 Zi3; Lǐ Dázhì) – Justin Lau (Note: 劉彥德; 刘彦德; Lau4 Jin6 Dak1; Liú Yàndé)
- HKPF Security Wing officer Vanessa Wu (Note: 胡麗莎; 胡丽莎; Wu4 Lai6 Saa1; Hú Lìshā) – Cindy Wong
- Chinese Ministry of State Security Attaché Han Wei (Note: 漢 衞; 汉 衞; Hàn Wèi; hon3 wai6) – Simon Zeng Hao (Note: 曾 昊; Zēng Hào; zang1 hou6)
- Lecia Lau (Note: 劉麗斯; 刘丽斯; Lau4 Lai6 Si1; Liú Lìsī), reporter at The South China Sentinel – Shi Yi Ng (Note: 黃詩藝; 黄诗艺; Huáng Shīyì; wong4 si1 ngai6)
- Wu Xingwei (Note: 胡星尉; Hú Xīngwèi; wu4 sing1 wai3), editor of The South China Sentinel – Guo Aibing (Note: 郭愛兵; 郭爱兵; Guō Àibīng; gwok3 oi3 bing1)

== Release and reception ==
The film was released on YouTube on Tuesday 25 June 2013. Several publications contacted the filming group for interviews, with The Wall Street Journal being the first and the Agence France-Presse (AFP) and the Los Angeles Times doing so afterwards. The interviews increased interest in the film. By 28 June, it got over 5,000 views, and by 30 June it had gained over 8,500 views. By 2 July it got over 89,000 views. By 16 July it received over 220,000 hits. By 30 July it received almost 250,000 views.

Luke Buckmaster of the online Australian political news magazine Crikey stated that Verax's "greatest asset is its showcase of narrative efficiency; of getting key points across using the language and arrangement of images to solicit logical (not necessarily emotional responses) and doing so without needing to put too fine a point on it." Jin Jiabao of China Central Television said that the film's events were "vividly portrayed".

Stephanie Ip of the Associated Press wrote that the film initially gained popularity but by 29 July 2013, "praise of the film has given way to criticism, with many viewers berating the four directors for amateur work and bad casting." Adam Withnall wrote in The Belfast Telegraph that "many have criticised the four directors for amateur work and bad casting" and in The Independent that "a wider international audience hasn't been so forgiving of its less-than-professional quirks." The cast of the television program New Day said "We hope [Andrew Cromeek] and the rest of the cast are better at their real jobs."

In regards to the criticism, Andrew Cromeek argued that the filmmakers did not expect to gain a large amount of attention on YouTube and that the filmmakers were not professional. Cromeek said "I think the way it was shot was quite cool. We are all amateur actors. We all had one take. It was kind of like, shoot, go, OK, done. So it's fine. It's completely OK if people are like, 'It's the worst acting in the world.' It's totally fine with me." Ip wrote that Verax "is a source of pride for the friends who made it, even as they acknowledge its limitations."
