= Kunlun Energy =

Kunlun Energy Limited 昆仑能源有限公司
- Type: State-owned enterprise (Red chip)
- Traded as: SEHK: 135
- Industry: Oil and gas exploration
- Founded: 1994
- Headquarters: Hong Kong Island, Hong Kong
- Area served: China
- Key people: Li Hualin (Chairman)
- Parent: China National Petroleum Corporation
- Website: www.kunlun.com.hk

Kunlun Energy
- Simplified Chinese: 昆仑能源有限公司
- Traditional Chinese: 昆侖能源有限公司
Transcriptions
Standard Mandarin
- Hanyu Pinyin: Kūnlún Néngyuán Yǒuxiàn Gōngsī

Abbreviated as
- Simplified Chinese: 昆仑能源
- Traditional Chinese: 昆侖能源
Transcriptions
Standard Mandarin
- Hanyu Pinyin: Kūnlún Néngyuán

Kunlun Energy Company Limited, formerly CNPC (Hong Kong) Limited, became a Hong Kong-listed company in 1993 through a backdoor listing. Its parent company is the China National Petroleum Corporation which itself was created from the transformation of the Ministry of Petroleum Industry of China in 1988. It is engaged in the investment of exploration, development and production of crude oil and natural gas in China, Kazakhstan, Oman, Peru, Thailand, Azerbaijan and Indonesia.

== See also ==
- Energy in Hong Kong
