= Energy in Hong Kong =

Energy in Hong Kong refers to the type of energy and its related infrastructure used in Hong Kong. Energy is crucial for the development of trade and industries in Hong Kong with its relatively small usable land. Hong Kong mostly imports its energy from outside or produces it through some intermediate process. The city has various concurrent projects and efficiency codes dedicated to renewable energy.

Primary Energy Requirements by Source in Hong Kong (2012)
1. Oil (62.9%)
2. Coal (28.6%)
3. Imports of electricity (8.46%)
Total Energy Consumption by Sector in Hong Kong (2019)
1. Commercial (43.4%)
2. Transport (31.0%)
3. Residential (21.3%)
4. Industrial (4.30%)

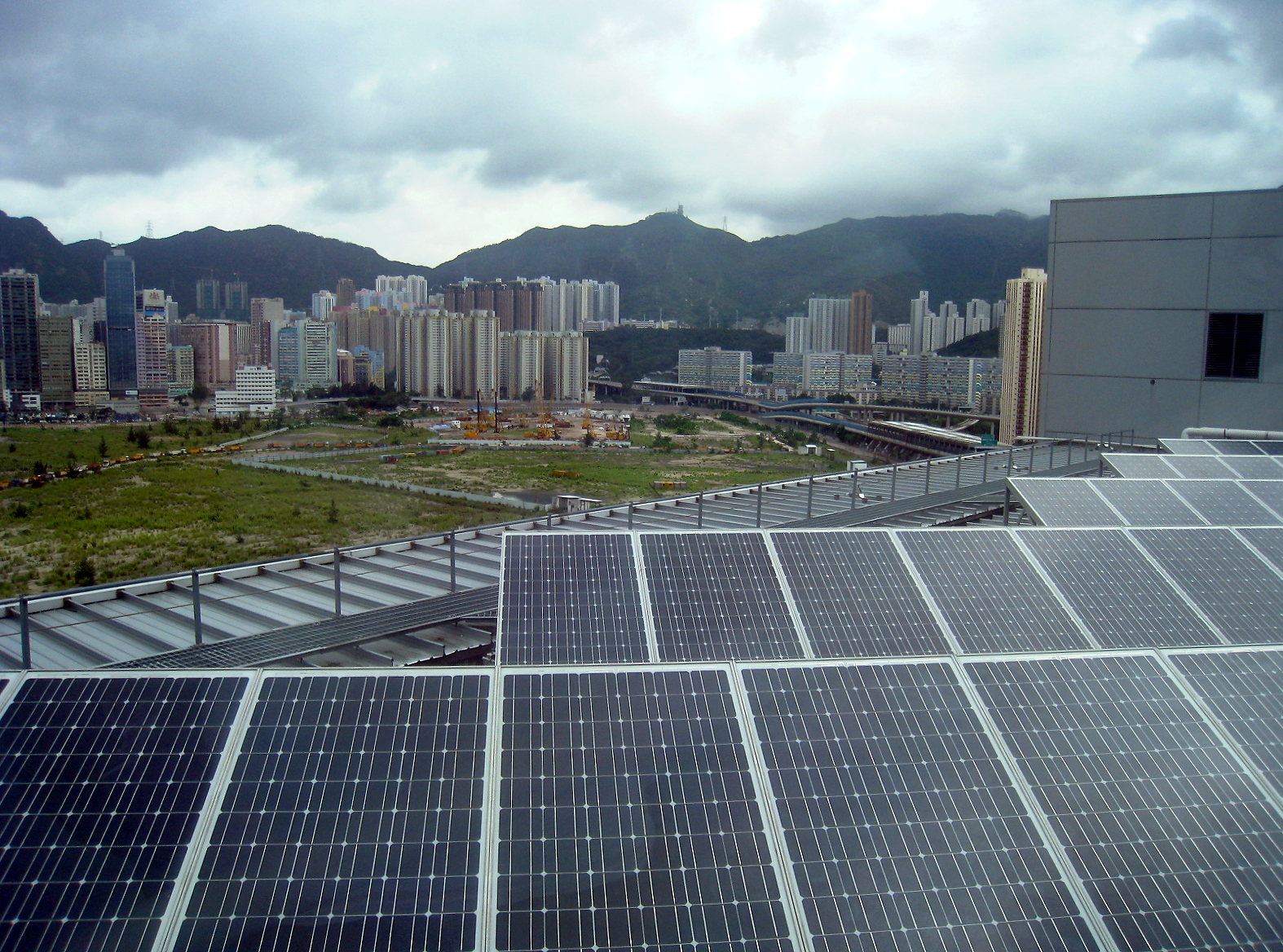
Solar PV power generation in Hong Kong

== Energy sources ==
Hong Kong electricity supply by source

=== Coal ===
Hong Kong meets all of its coal demand through imports. In 2021, 6.5 million tonnes of coal were imported. In recent years, Indonesia (81.9%) has become the largest supplier, followed by Russia (10.3%), Australia (5.3%) and Canada (2.4%).

Most of the energy generated by coal in Hong Kong is for electricity generation. Hong Kong currently has a total of about 5 GW of capacity for coal-fired power stations.

=== Natural gas ===
Natural gas was first introduced for electricity generation in Hong Kong in January 1996. Black Point Power Station was first commissioned in 1996 and has increased capacity to 3.2 GW in 2020 . Lamma Power Station, originally commissioned as a coal power plant, has expanded to include gas turbines since.

=== Nuclear ===
Hong Kong has no indigenous supply of nuclear energy and there is no nuclear power station in the territory. However, Hong Kong has imported electricity from mainland China from the Daya Bay Nuclear Power Plant in Shenzhen, Guangdong since 1994.

=== Hydro ===
Hong Kong has one hydropower plant in Tuen Mun coupled with a water treatment plant, but otherwise lacks rivers with significant flow to generate hydropower.

=== Oil ===
Oil products imported to Hong Kong have always mostly come from Singapore. Singapore accounted for 75.8% of fuel oil imports and 75.4% of unleaded motor gasoline imports. Mainland China and Macau are the two largest destination for oil products re-exporting from Hong Kong.

=== Solar ===
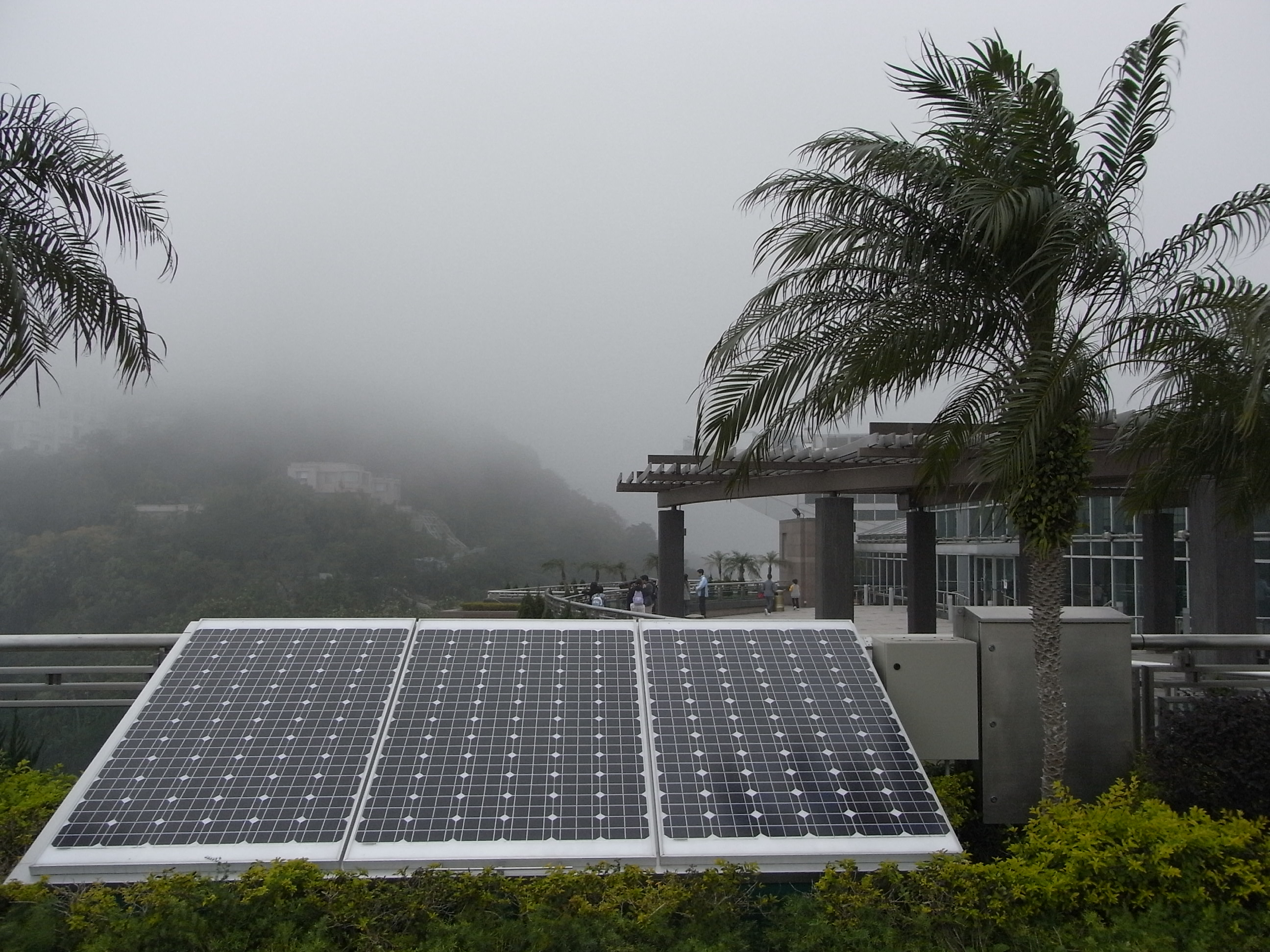
Photovoltaic panels at The Peak Galleria

Hong Kong has been using solar energy over the past 20 years. As of 2013, there is a 1 MW installed capacity of photovoltaic at Lamma Power Station, doubling its size from 550 kW since its first commissioning in July 2010.

=== Wind ===
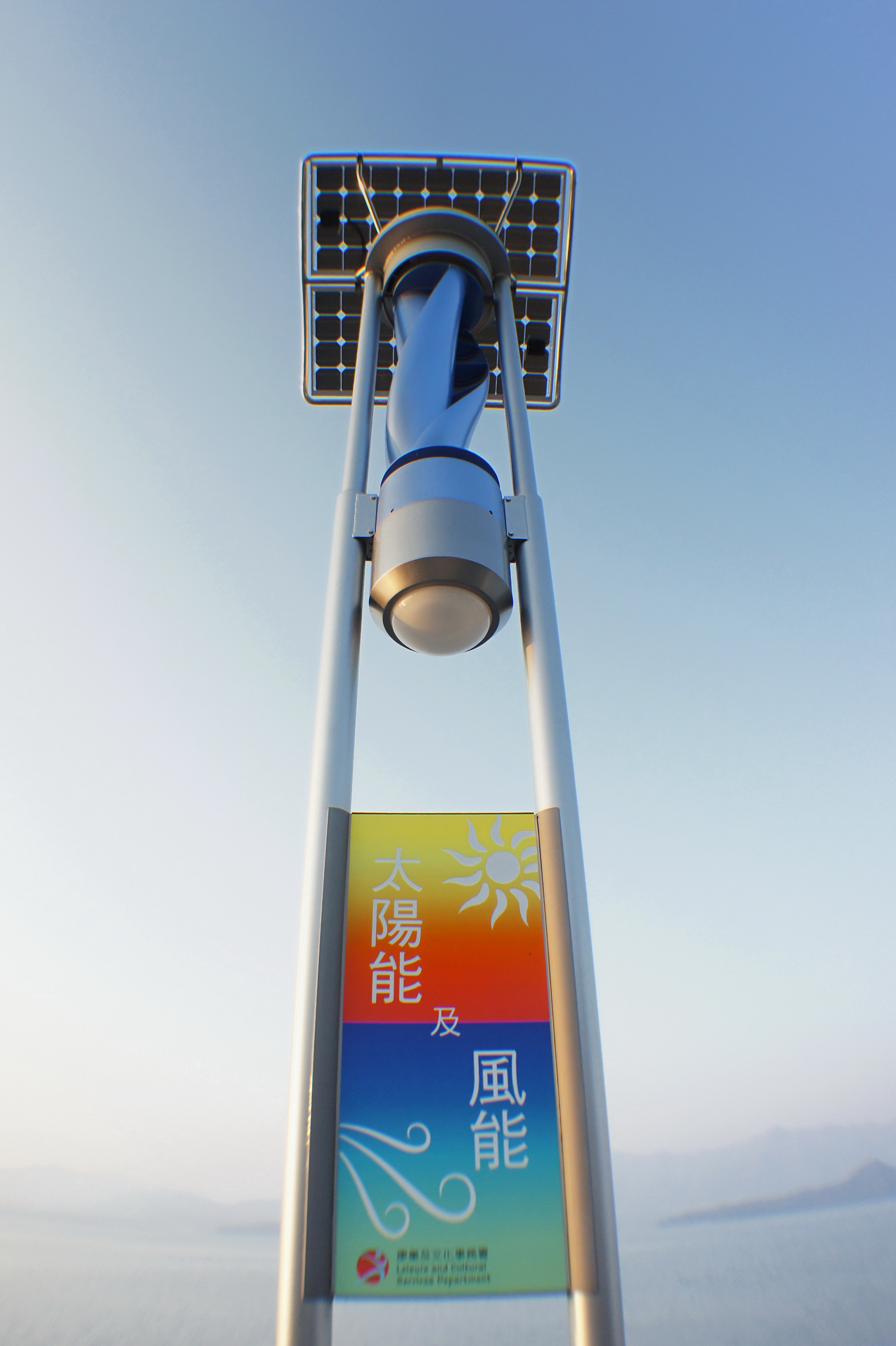
Solar and wind-powered lamp in Ma On Shan

Hong Kong has a very small scale of wind power generation since early 2006, which is the Lamma Winds at Lamma Island with an installed capacity of 800 kW. The same year, a farm of 40 windmills was proposed. In March 2013, HK Electric has just completed the full-year wind measurement for a proposal of offshore wind farm project in Southwest Lamma Island.

On 6 May 2022, the development of an offshore wind farm southwest of Lamma Island was announced, but was later placed on hold.

Decommissioning of the Lamma Island wind turbine was announced on 25 March 2026.

== Renewable energy projects in Hong Kong ==
Production of renewable energy is difficult given the city's small geographical size. One advantage is the city's location in the subtropics, generating a significant amount of solar energy. The annual average global horizontal radiation measures 1.29 MWh/m^{2}. The government of Hong Kong invests and develops RE projects in order to utilize this resource in accordance to its Climate Action Plan 2050.

=== Solar energy projects ===
Current Solar Energy Projects as of February 2025
Location	Project	Department	Annual Production (kW)
Shek Pik Reservoir	Floating Solar Energy Generation	Water Supplies	120,000
Plover Clove Reservoir	Floating Solar Energy Generation	Water Supplies	120,000
Tai Lam Chung Reservoir	Floating Solar Energy Generation	Water Supplies	120,000
Stonecutters Island Sewage Treatment Works	Thin-Film Solar Energy Generation	Drainage Services	Data Unavailable
Jordan Valley Landfill	Solar Landfill Restoration	Environmental Protection	180,000

=== Waste-to-energy projects ===
==== Tai Po and Sha Tin Sewage Works ====
A trial scheme launched by the Environmental Protection Department and the Drainage Services Department allows 50 tonnes of food waste/sewage to be treated and turned into energy. The program annually produces around 950,000 kWh.

==== T-PARK ====
Located in Tuen Mun and commissioned by the Environmental Protection Department, this facility treats over 2000 tonnes of waste/sewage per day. The facility receives waste from Stonecutters Island Sewage Treatment Works and is completely self-sufficient in power. T-PARK incinerates sludge, producing combustion gases which are then treated accordingly, and steam which feeds its two steam turbine generators. It generates up to 2 MW of surplus energy for the power grid.

==== O-PARK1: Organic resources recovery centre (ORRC) Phase 1 ====
Launched in 2018 and located in Sin Ho Wan on Lantau Island, O-PARK1 processes organic waste into biogas. This biogas is then purified, removing carbon dioxide (CO_{2}), Hydrogen Sulfide (H_{2}S), water vapor, and other gases, turning it into biomethane. Some of the remaining biomethane turns into biofertilizer, promoting sustainable agriculture. The facility processes 200 tonnes of organic waste per day, and produces 14 million kWh and 20 tonnes of biofertilizer annually.

==== O-PARK2: ORRC Phase 2 ====
O-PARK2 is located in the North District, and was completed in 2024. This facility serves the same purpose as O-PARK1, but on a larger scale. It produces 24 million kWh annually.

==== ORRC Phase 3 ====
ORRC Phase 3 is located in Shek Kong and is still under construction. It is expected to be completed in 2027.

==== I-PARK1 ====
I-PARK1 is located on an artificial island near Shek Kwu Chau and is set to operate in 2025. It is projected to produce 480 million kWh annually once fully operational.

== Energy efficiency ==
The Hong Kong government promotes energy efficiency through the establishment of the Energy Advisory Committee and Energy Efficiency Office (EEO). The Energy Advisory Committee was established to provide guidance to the government on energy policy, covering areas such as energy supply and demand, as well as energy conservation and efficiency. The EEO issues Building Energy Codes (BEC), establishing required guidelines for construction projects. This affects all building related aspects such as air conditioning, lighting, lifts and elevators, electrical devices, etc.

=== Effectiveness of BECs ===
BECs have proven to be very effective in reducing the energy consumption of buildings, overall energy consumption from buildings saved by BECs can be estimated to be around 20.5% of their annual energy usage.

==== HVAC systems ====
Given the subtropical temperatures of Hong Kong, the internal temperature of buildings can be comfortably increased while staying within the thermal comfort zone, reducing the energy needs of HVAC systems. These temperature ranges are shown in the yearly BEC guidelines. Other tactics and suggestions by BECs include retrofitting air conditioning systems with variable speed drives and other emerging HVAC technologies.

==== Lighting ====
The main tactic for BECs to increase energy efficiency with lighting are through reducing lighting density and operation time. The BEC handbook lists maximum power of lighting in rooms depending on use, along with if they need automatic lighting control. Automatic lighting control also has the added benefit of reducing the cooling load.

==== Electrical systems ====
Electrical systems are defined as all electrical systems in a building unless otherwise specified, this includes any circuit that is fed by an external power supply. BECs related to this section relate to power loss, efficiency and control. Minimum rated efficiencies are listed separated by power output.

==== Cost-benefit analysis ====
A study conducted in 2005 showed an annual saving of electricity due to BECs to be around 2,928,333,333 kWh. Assuming that the life cycle of electrical equipment in buildings last for 20 years, the estimated saved due to these measures would be around $19,157,132,340 HKD.

== Regulatory body ==
Energy-related affairs are regulated by the Electrical and Mechanical Services Department (EMSD; Chinese: 機電工程署) under the Development Bureau of the Government of Hong Kong.

== Companies ==
Energy-related companies of Hong Kong are:

- China Resources Petroleum Company Limited
- CLP Group
- The Hong Kong and China Gas Company
- Hongkong Electric Company
- Kunlun Energy
- SS United Group Oil & Gas Company
- Towngas China

== Education ==
Energy-related education centres in Hong Kong include:

- Nuclear Resources Centre at Kowloonbay International Trade & Exhibition Centre
- EMSD Education Path at Kowloon
- Zero Carbon Building in Kowloon Bay

== See also ==
- Energy policy of China
- Electricity sector in Hong Kong
