= Lee Shau-kee =

Hong Kong real estate billionaire (1928–2025)

The Honourable Lee Shau-kee GBM
- 李兆基
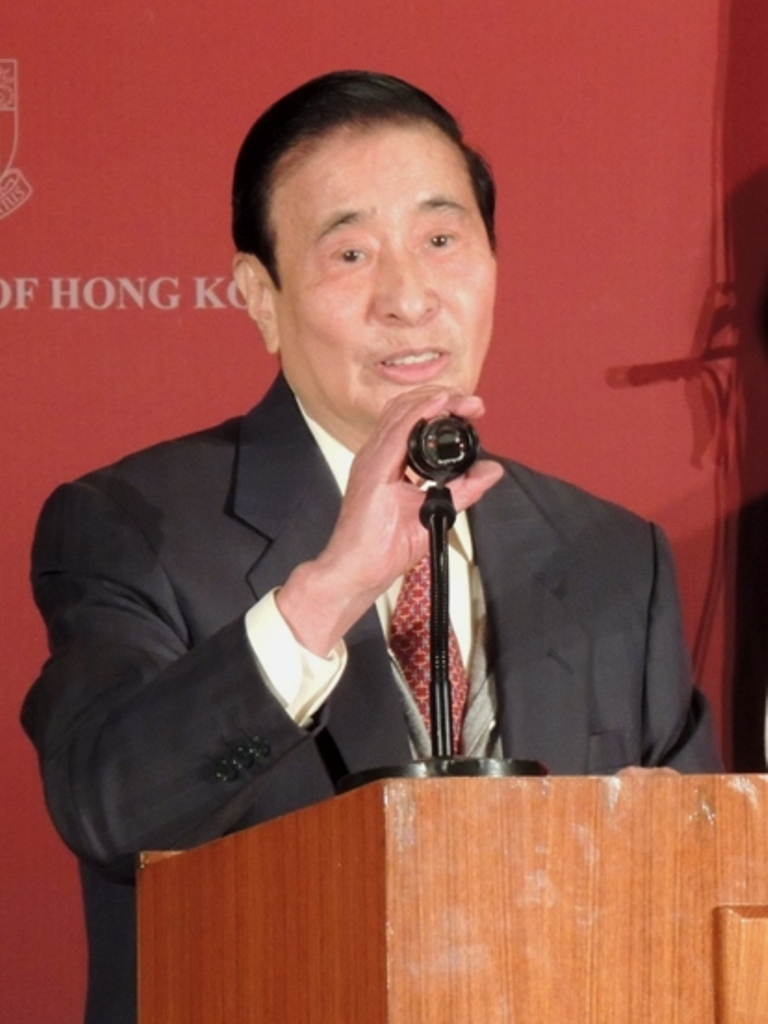
- Lee in 2013
- Born: 20 February 1928; Shunde, Guangdong, China
- Died: 17 March 2025 (aged 97); Hong Kong Sanatorium & Hospital, Hong Kong
- Occupations: Real estate investor; philanthropist
- Known for: Founding: Henderson Land Development; Hong Kong and China Gas; Miramar Hotel
- Spouse: Lau Wai-kuen (divorced)

Chinese name
- Chinese: 李兆基
Transcriptions
Standard Mandarin
- Hanyu Pinyin: Li Zhaoji
- Website: www.leeshaukee.com.hk

Lee Shau-kee GBM (Chinese: 李兆基; 20 February 1928 – 17 March 2025) was a Hong Kong business magnate, investor and philanthropist. He was a real estate tycoon and majority owner of Henderson Land Development, a property conglomerate with interests in property, hotels, restaurants and internet services in Hong Kong and other countries. In 2019, aged 91, Lee stepped down as chairman and managing director of the company, in favour of two of his sons, Peter and Martin Lee. He retained a role as an executive director.

His personal wealth was estimated by Bloomberg Billionaires Index to be US$23.2 billion at the time of his death, making him the second wealthiest man in Hong Kong (behind Li Ka-shing), and the 89th richest in the world. Before the handover of Hong Kong in 1997, he was the fourth-richest person in the world.

== Philanthropy ==
Lee was one of the main sponsors of the HKICC Lee Shau Kee School of Creativity, having donated more than HK$20 million through the Lee Shau Kee Foundation.

In 2007, he donated HK$500 million to the University of Hong Kong and HK$400 million to the Hong Kong University of Science and Technology.

In 2015, Lee donated a site in Yuen Long to charity organisation Po Leung Kuk for it to develop Hong Kong's biggest youth hostel. Lee announced that the units would be leased to young people between the ages of 18 and 30 at half the market rate.

Other than public philanthropy, Lee had given his Henderson Land staff cash gifts to celebrate the birth of four of his grandchildren, in amounts totalling HK$60 million over a nine-year period.

In May 2018, Lee donated HK$100 million to Hang Seng Management College supporting its strategic development.

== Positions ==
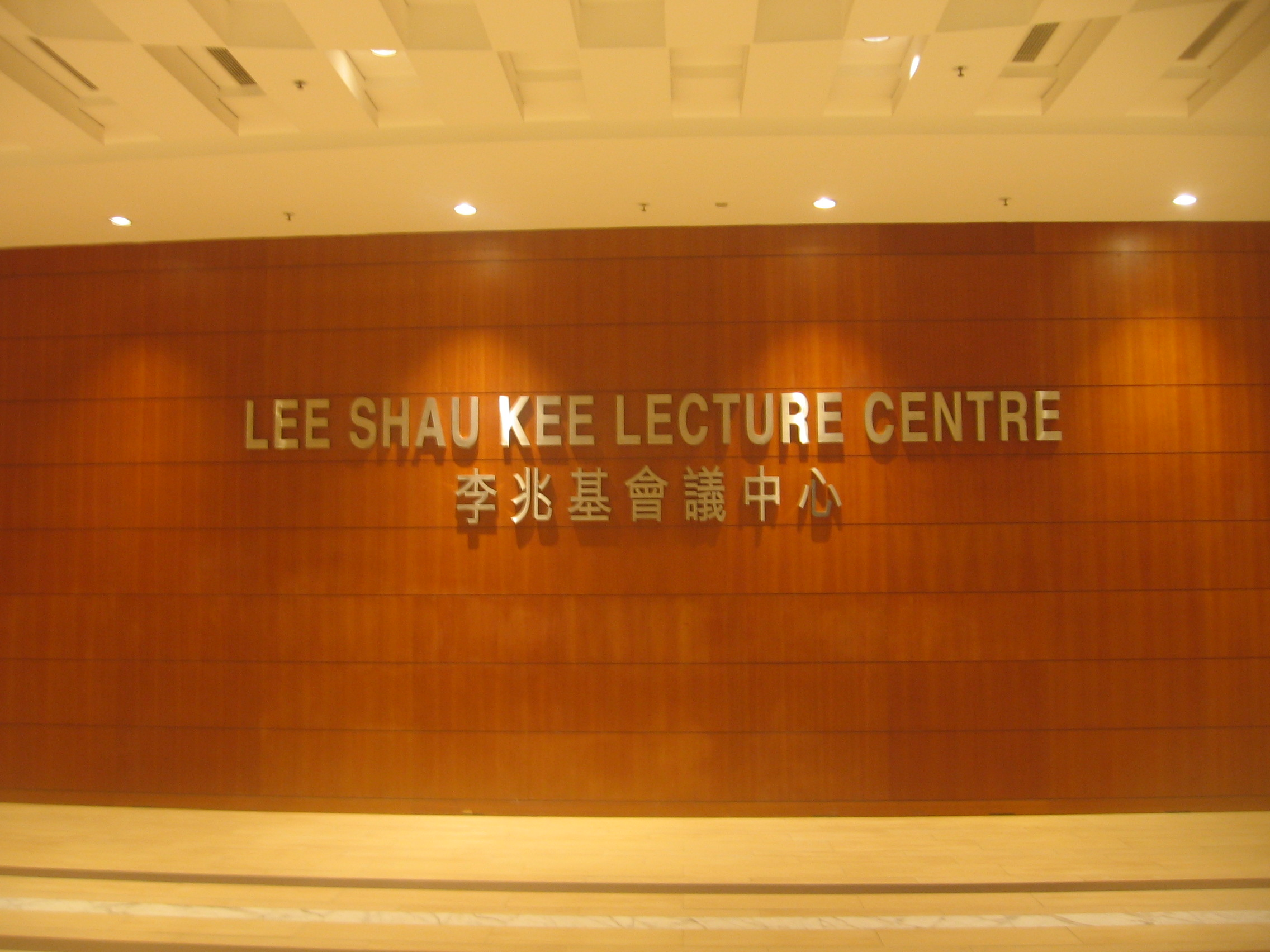
Lee Shau Kee Lecture Centre at The University of Hong Kong

- Founder, ex-Chairman and managing director, of Henderson Land Development
- ex-Chairman of Hong Kong and China Gas
- ex-Chairman of Miramar Hotel and Investment
- Vice-Chairman and independent non-executive director of Sun Hung Kai Properties
- Member of board of directors of Hong Kong Ferry (Holdings) and the Bank of East Asia
- Named as part of Peter Storrie's consortium to buy Portsmouth Football Club

== Personal life and death ==
Lee had five children, including elder son Peter Lee Ka-kit and younger son Martin Lee Ka-shing, and eight grandchildren.

Lee died on the evening of 17 March 2025, at the age of 97.

== See also ==
- List of billionaires
- List of Chinese by net worth
- Bloomberg Index
