= Miramar Hotel and Investment =

Hong Kong hotel chain company

Miramar Hotel and Investment Company Limited 美麗華酒店企業有限公司
- Company type: Listed company
- Industry: Hotel operations and management
- Founded: 1957; 69 years ago
- Founder: Mr. Young Chi Wan
- Headquarters: Kowloon, Hong Kong
- Area served: Hong Kong
- Key people: Chairman and CEO: Mr. Lee Shau Kee
- Parent: Henderson Land Development
- Website: Miramar Hotel and Investment Company Limited

Miramar Hotel and Investment
- Traditional Chinese: 美麗華酒店企業有限公司
- Simplified Chinese: 美丽华酒店企业有限公司
Transcriptions
Standard Mandarin
- Hanyu Pinyin: Měilì Huá Jiǔdiàn Qǐyè Yǒuxiàngōngsī
Yue: Cantonese
- Jyutping: mei5 lai6 waa4 zau2 dim3 kei5 jip6 jau5 haan6 gung1 si1

Miramar Hotel and Investment Company Limited (Miramar Group) (Chinese: 美麗華酒店企業有限公司) (SEHK: 71) is a group with a diversified service-oriented business portfolio comprising hotels and serviced apartments, property rental, food and beverage, and travel services in Hong Kong and mainland China. Miramar Group has been listed on the Hong Kong Stock Exchange since 1970 (HKEx Stock Code: 71) and is a member of Henderson Land Group.

== History ==
The group was founded in 1957 by Mr. Young Chi Wan (Chinese: 楊志雲) after taking over the Spanish Catholic Missions-owned hotel property on Nathan Road, Kowloon, Hong Kong. It was listed on the Hong Kong Stock Exchange in 1970. It was also a member of Hang Seng Index Constituent Stocks (blue-chip stocks) from 1974 to 1996. In 1993, it was acquired by Henderson Investment, a subsidiary of Henderson Land Development.

== See also ==
- The Mira Hong Kong
- Miramar Shopping Centre
