= Martin Lee Ka-shing =

Hong Kong businessman

Martin Lee 李家誠
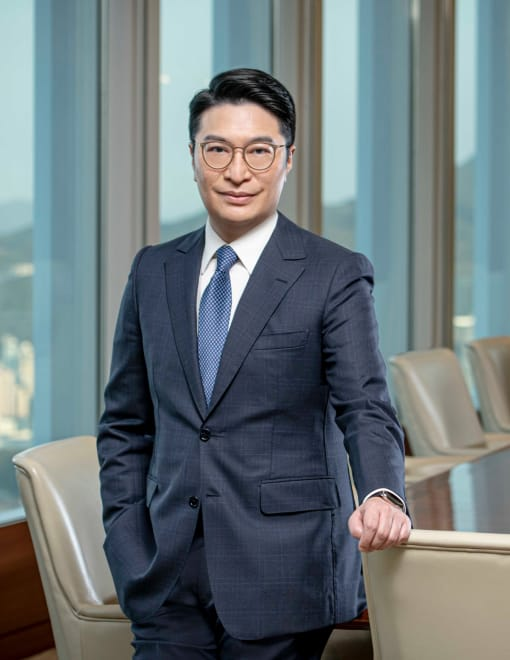
- Born: 1971 (age 54–55); Hong Kong
- Education: St Joseph's College, Hong Kong; Wilfrid Laurier University
- Occupation: Businessman
- Organisation: Henderson Land Development
- Spouse(s): Cathy Chui (徐子淇), m. 2006
- Children: 4

Chinese name
- Traditional Chinese: 李家誠
- Simplified Chinese: 李家诚
Transcriptions
Standard Mandarin
- Hanyu Pinyin: Lǐ Jiāchéng

Martin Lee Ka-shing (born 1971) is a Hong Kong businessman. He is chairman of Henderson Land Development, a real estate developer in Hong Kong. He is also chairman and managing director of Henderson Investment Limited, chairman and chief executive officer (CEO) of Miramar Hotel and Investment Company, and chairman of The Hong Kong and China Gas Company Limited, all of which are listed companies. He is the son of real estate tycoon and majority owner of Henderson Land Development Lee Shau-kee.

== Career ==
Lee was educated in Canada before returning to join his father's company Henderson Land as an executive director in 1993. In 2019, he was appointed chairman and managing director after working as vice chairman for 14 years.

== Philanthropy ==
Lee is a supporter of a broad range of community initiatives aimed at improving people’s quality of life and bringing about positive social change.

Under his stewardship, Henderson Land was the first developer in Hong Kong to participate in the Hong Kong SAR Government’s transitional housing schemes. It also initiated the city’s largest transitional housing project in 2019 by providing a 428,000-square-foot site in Kong Ha Wai, Yuen Long for low-income families.

== Public roles ==
- Member of the 14th Beijing Municipal Committee of the Chinese People’s Political Consultative Conference (CCPCC)
- Member of the Chief Executive’s Policy Unit Expert Group
- Executive Vice Chairman of the Federation of Hong Kong Beijing Organisations
- Council Member of the Centum Charitas Foundation
- Vice Chairman of the Hong Kong Committee for UNICEF

== Awards and honours ==
- Gold Bauhinia Star (GBS)
- Justice of the Peace (JP)
- Honorary Fellowship from University College London
- Honorary Doctorate of Social Science from the Hang Seng University of Hong Kong
- Member of the Court of the University of Hong Kong
- Member of the Court of the Hong Kong Polytechnic University
- Member of the Court of City University of Hong Kong

== Personal life ==
Lee was born in Hong Kong. He is the younger son of Lee Shau-kee, the founder and chairman of Henderson Land Development. He married former actress Cathy Chui in Australia in 2006; they have two daughters and two sons.
