= The Mira Hong Kong =

Coordinates: 22°18′1″N 114°10′20″E

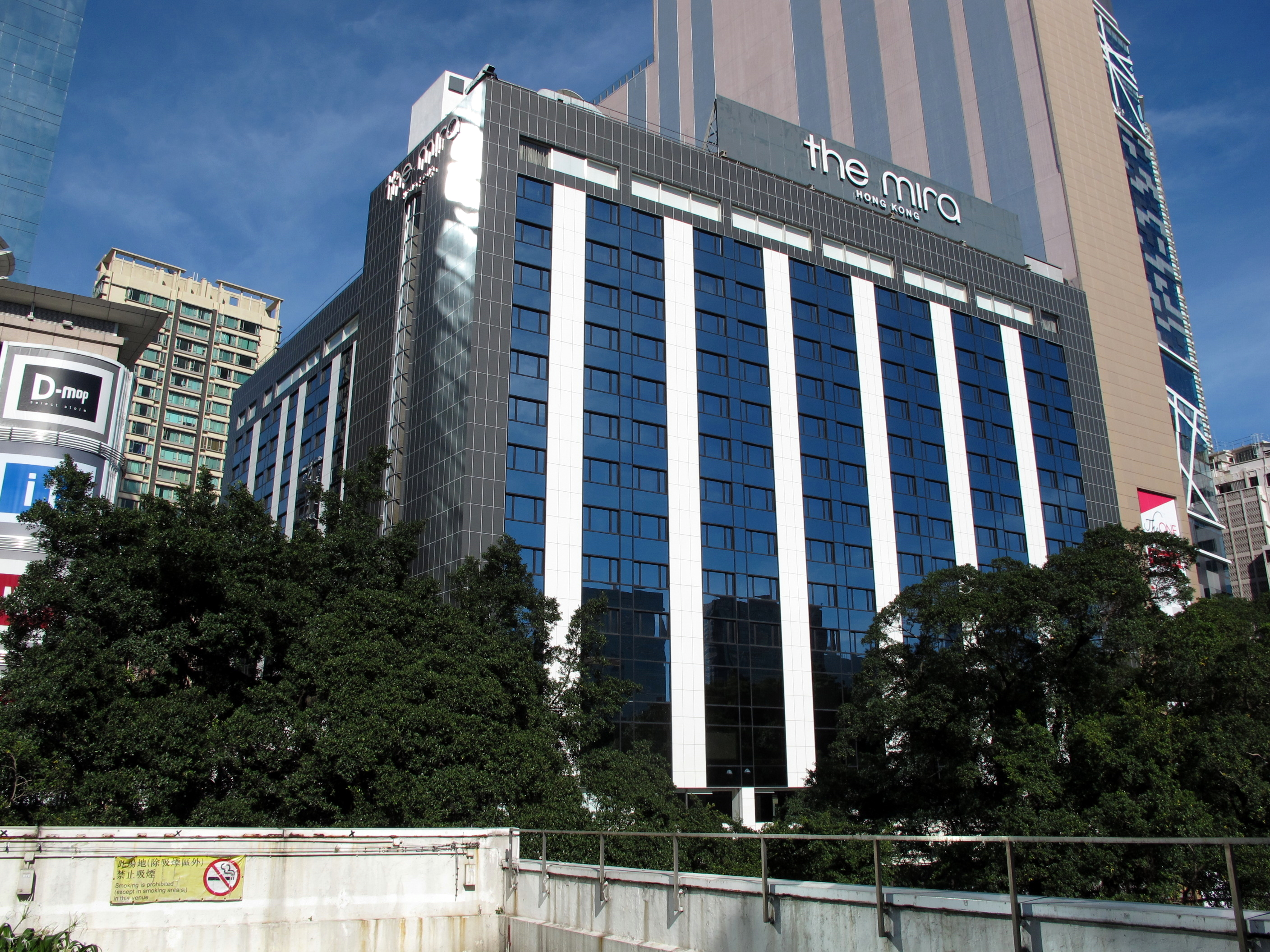
- The Mira Hong Kong

- Location within Hong Kong urban core

General information
- Location: 118 Nathan Road, Tsim Sha Tsui, Hong Kong
- Opening: 1948; 78 years ago
- Operator: Miramar Hotel and Investment

Design and construction
- Architect: Edmond Wong

The Mira Hong Kong is a hotel in Tsim Sha Tsui, Hong Kong. It has 492 rooms and suites, six restaurants and bars, and a spa centre. It was renovated in 2009 and became smoke-free in 2011.

The hotel is owned by Miramar Hotel and Investment. It was designed by architect Edmond Wong. Interiors were designed by "lifestyle guru" Colin Cowie.

== History ==
From after 1911 until 1925, the site was occupied by the Club de Recreio (西洋波會). The Club then moved to its present location at King's Park along Gascoigne Road.

The hotel was formerly named Hotel Miramar. It opened in 1948, with 32 rooms, as Hong Kong's first post-war hotel. A major expansion in 1953 added 160 new rooms. It was purchased in 1957 from a Spanish mission by the founders of Miramar Hotel and Investment Company, Limited. A new wing was built in two phases, increasing the number of rooms to 380 by 1973.

The grand opening of the rebranded and redesigned hotel took place on 17 September 2009.

In 2013, after fleeing from Hawaii, Edward Snowden stayed in The Mira for a total of 20 days wherein he leaked thousands of classified National Security Agency (NSA) documents regarding global surveillance to journalists. His presence at the hotel was a global spectacle with a media frenzy surrounding it. Laura Poitras created a documentary regarding these revelations named Citizenfour (which won the Academy Award for Best Documentary Feature Film in 2015). A large portion was shot inside the hotel.

The short film Verax, regarding the 2013 global surveillance disclosures by Edward Snowden features the hotel. The film's budget included a one night stay at The Mira, the most expensive item on the budget.

On 21 January 2019, a window fell from the hotel and killed a passerby walking on Nathan Road.

== See also ==
- Mira Place – the connected shopping mall
- Citizenfour
