= Henderson Land Development =

Real estate company

Henderson Land Development Co. Ltd. 恒基兆業地產有限公司
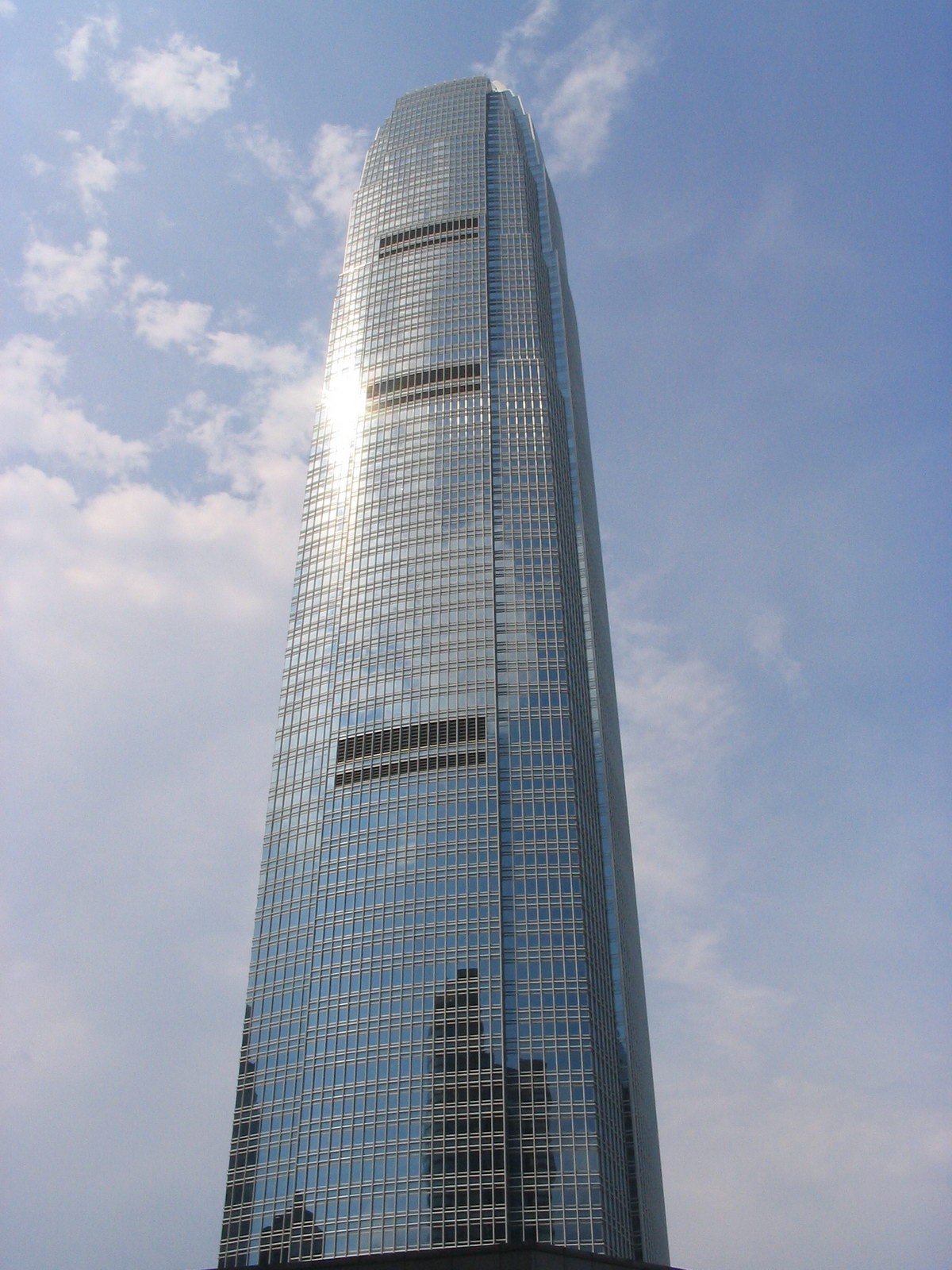
- Headquarters at International Finance Centre
- Company type: Public
- Traded as: SEHK: 12; Hang Seng Index component
- Industry: Property
- Founded: 1976
- Headquarters: 2IFC, Hong Kong Island, Hong Kong
- Key people: Colin Lam, Chairman Ka-shing Lee, Ka-kit Lee, Vice Chairmen
- Products: Real estate, investment, hotels, utilities
- Revenue: HKD 5,833 million (2005)
- Operating income: HKD 1,763 million (2005)
- Owner: Lee Shau Kee (70.17% – June 2015)
- Number of employees: 6,500
- Parent: Henderson Development Ltd.
- Subsidiaries: Henderson Investment Ltd.
- Website: www.hld.com
- Footnotes / references Associates: Towngas (41.51%), Miramar Hotel and Investment Co, Ltd (45.08%) and Hong Kong Ferry (33.33%).

Henderson Land Development
- Traditional Chinese: 恒基兆業地產有限公司
- Simplified Chinese: 恒基兆业地产有限公司
Transcriptions
Standard Mandarin
- Hanyu Pinyin: Héngjīzhàoyè Dìchǎn Yǒuxiàngōngsī
Yue: Cantonese
- Jyutping: hang4 gei1 siu6 jip6 dei6 caan2 jau5 haan6 gung1 si1

Henderson Land Development Co. Ltd. (Chinese: 恒基兆業地產有限公司) is a listed property developer in Hong Kong and a constituent of the Hang Seng Index. The company's principal activities are property development and investment, project management, construction, hotel operation, department store operation, finance, investment holding and infrastructure. It is the third largest Hong Kong real estate developer by market capitalisation. The company is controlled by Lee Shau Kee, who owns approximately 70.17% of the share capital as of June 2015.

== History ==
Founded by Li Shau-kee, the company was taken public in 1981 by Sun Hung Kai Securities. The shares were introduced at HK$4 by a novel, geared, method – there was to be an initial downpayment of HK$1 per share upon subscribing to the offer, with cash calls of another HK$1 six months later. The final HK$2 instalment would be due at the year end.

In 2006, the State Administration of Foreign Exchange (SAFE) found that Henderson had breached the foreign-exchange regulations in the amount of HK$565 million. Henderson allegedly engaged Shenzhen Zhaotian Investments, headed by Tian Chenggang – whose father is former vice-premier Tian Jiyun – to lobby for leniency from the potential fine of 150 million yuan, according to Tian. On 4 December 2006, the company was issued with a fine of 2.33 million yuan (HK$2.9 million), which the company paid. Zhaotian sued in Hong Kong in 2012, claiming an oral agreement between Tian Chenggang and CFO Alexander Au for a HK$43 million "consultation fee", and failed upon appeal in 2015 due to the absence of documentary evidence of the agreement.

=== Senior leadership ===
==== Chairman ====
1. Lee Shau-kee (1976–2019)
2. Peter Lee and Martin Lee (2019– )

==== Vice-Chairman ====
1. Lo Tak-shing (1981–1993)
2. Lo Tak-shing, Peter Lee and Colin Lam (1993–2005)
3. Lo Tak-shing, Peter Lee, Colin Lam and Martin Lee (2005–2006)
4. Peter Lee, Colin Lam and Martin Lee (2005–2019)
5. Colin Lam (2019– )

== Subsidiaries and associates ==
The company's stakes in its principal associates as at 31 December 2014 were Towngas (41.51%), Miramar Hotel and Investment Co, Ltd (45.08%) and Hong Kong Ferry (33.33%).

== Henderson Investment ==
As at 31 December 2014, Henderson Investment ("HI") was a 69.27% listed subsidiary of the company (67.14% as at 30 June 2006), which previously held the group stakes in the Hong Kong Ferry (Holdings) Company, the Miramar Hotel Group, and The Hong Kong and China Gas Company. Its shares have been consistently trading at below NAV.

=== Privatisation attempt ===
In November 2002, the company attempted to buy out minority shareholders by making an all-cash offer of HKD 7.60, representing a 40% discount to NAV. The buyout offer fell when it was opposed by more than 14% of the holders of the outstanding shares. In November 2005, it made another attempt when it offered one share for every 2.6 share in HI, although the offer was subsequently sweetened to 2.5 shares. The revised deal valued HI at an 18% discount to its net asset value. The company had persuaded shareholder Templeton Investment to back the buyout. Nevertheless, this second offer was again rejected, more narrowly this time, by 10.94% of the minority vote. This was in excess of the statutory blocking vote of 10%.

=== Asset sale to parent ===
==== Miramar and HK Ferry ====
When trading in both companies' shares were suspended on 26 March, there was speculation that the company would launch another buyout attempt after the expiry of the one year legal moratorium.

On 27 March 2007, it was reported that the company would not make another privatisation bid for the time being, but offered HK$12.1 billion for some of its subsidiary's assets, principally the holdings in Miramar Hotel and Hong Kong Ferry held by Henderson Investment. HI would make a special distribution of HK$5 per HI after the sale. Net of the HKD10.35 billion special distribution for its 73.5% stake, Henderson's net cash outlay will be $1.75 billion.

==== Towngas ====
On 3 October 2007, the company proposed to pay market value only to gain control of Towngas. It would acquire the 39.06 percent stake in Towngas held by subsidiary Henderson Investment for HK$42.86 billion in cash and convertible notes. Minority shareholders of Henderson Investment, who together hold 30.73%, would receive 204.1 million Henderson Land shares and HK$1.19 billion in cash. The offer was considered by analysts to be favourable to the company, and David Webb criticised the deal saying Henderson was acquiring the stake on the cheap, without paying any control premium to minority shareholders of Henderson Investment. Webb further criticised the nature of the offer as a back-door privatisation of Henderson Investment, which would virtually be a shell company after the transfer of the stake.

On 7 November, Henderson sweetened the offer to appease minority shareholders (mainly Elliott Capital) by increasing the cash portion to HK$2.24 per share. On 7 December 2007, Henderson secured shareholders' support for the usurpation.

== Sunlight REIT ==
On 8 December 2006, the company spun off and listed 12 office and 8 retail properties in Hong Kong into a Real Estate Investment Trust, Sunlight. However, the issue fell by 6.5% on its market début on 21 December, and as at March 2007 has fallen 16.2 percent (since the listing) due to investors' apprehension of financial engineering of the REIT.

The estimated distribution yield stands at 10%, the highest among Hong Kong REITs. Yet, investors fear a decline of distribution after yield-boosting mechanisms, such as interest swaps. Henderson Land also offered a temporary dividend waiver as a sweetener. Yields are expected to fall in 2010, and again in 2012 as rental reversions come through. The issue's flop was cited as the reason Regal Hotels International chose to delay its own planned REIT offering.

== Development projects ==
=== Beverly Hill ===
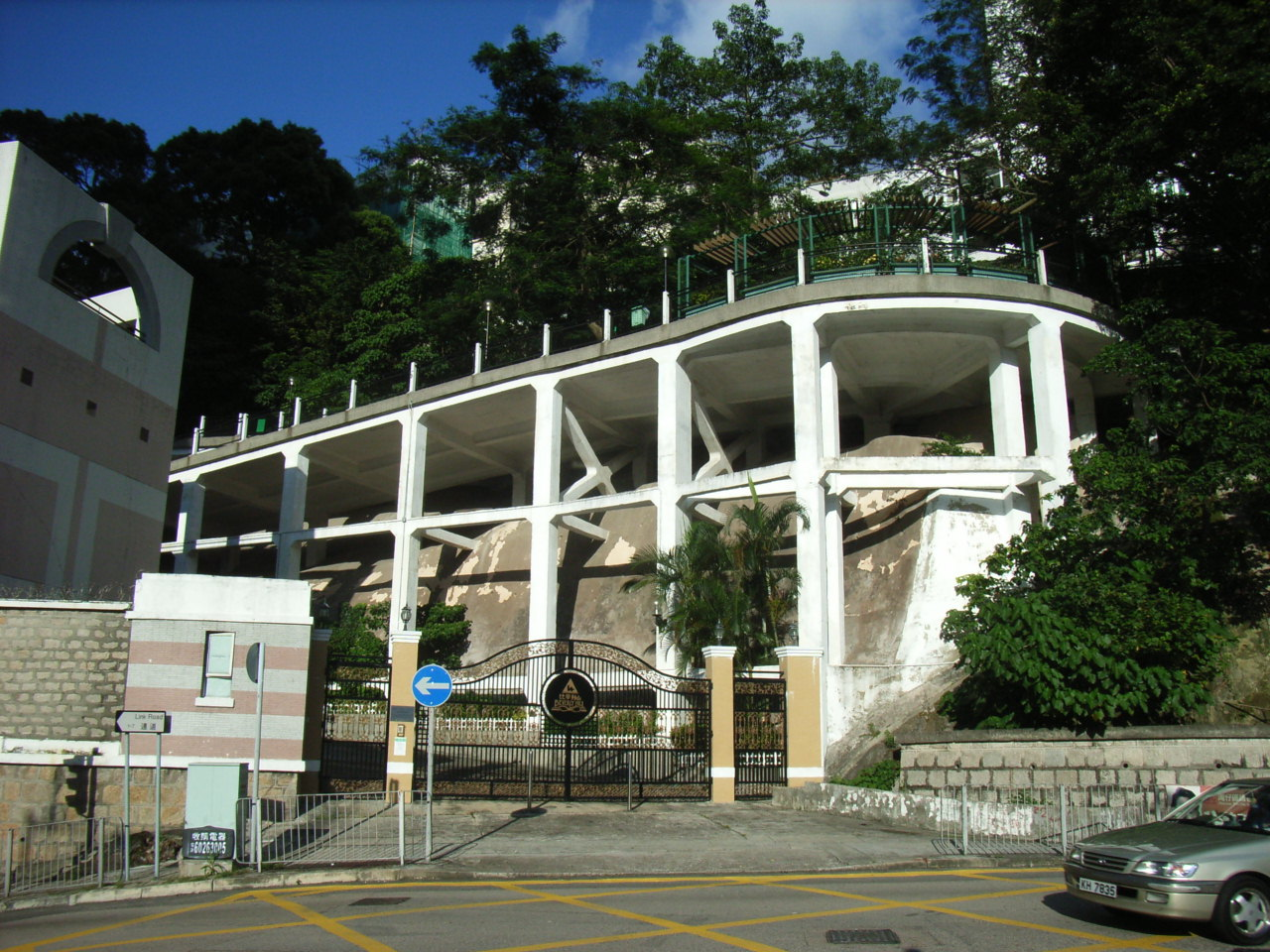
Beverly Hill

Beverly Hill (Chinese: 比華利山) is an upper class private housing estate in Happy Valley, Hong Kong, jointly developed by Henderson Land Development and Hang Lung Properties in 1988. It has ten 37-storey residential blocks built at a very steep slope of Broadwood Road and Link Road.

=== International Finance Centre ===
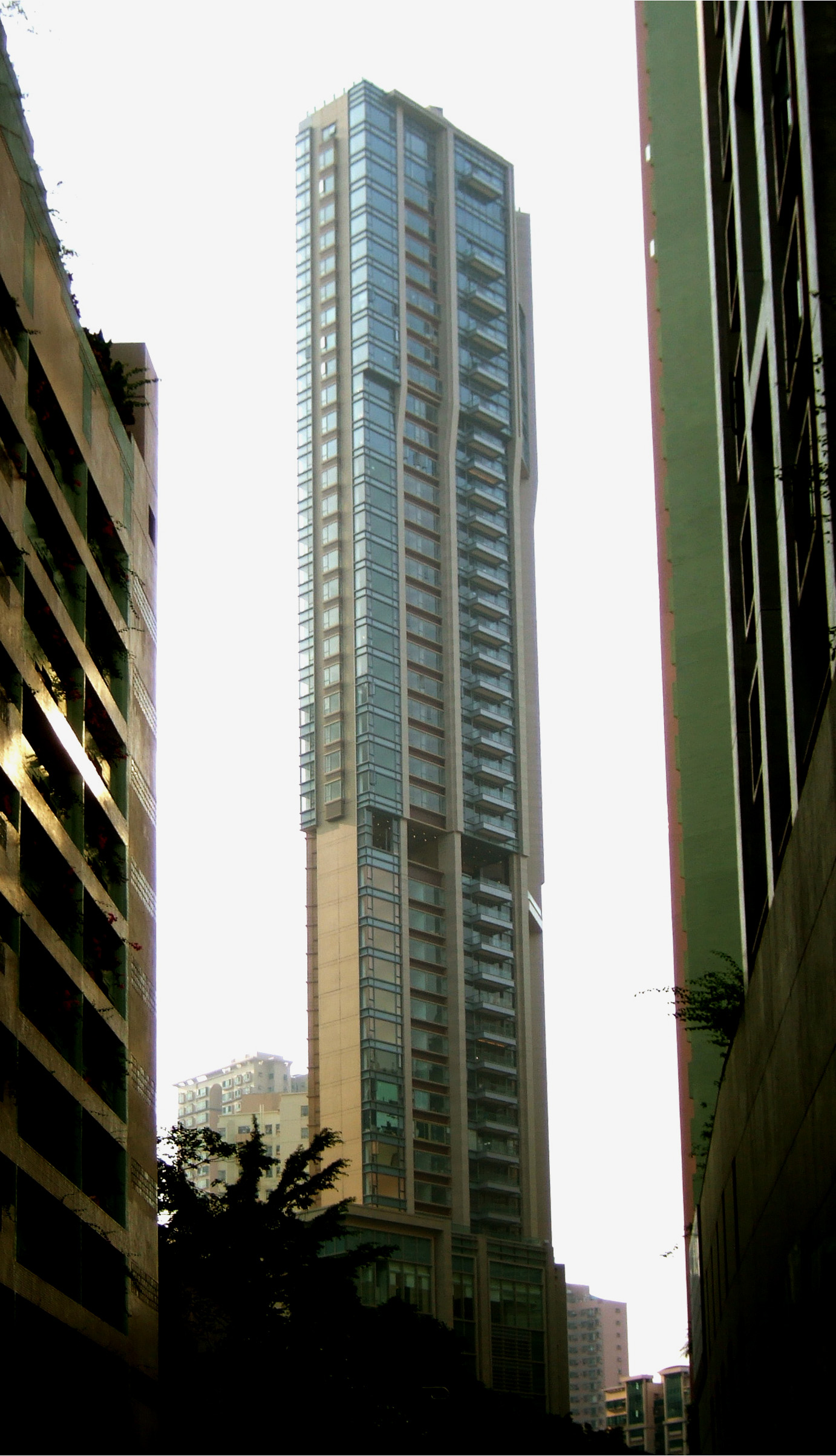
39 Conduit Road

In a joint venture with Sun Hung Kai and MTR Corporation, the company developed the International Finance Centre complex, which includes the landmark waterfront property and then tallest building in Hong Kong, completed in 2003. Since its completion, the company has its headquarters in the building.

=== 39 Conduit Road ===
39 Conduit Road is a residential development by the company situated in the mid-levels in Hong Kong. Soon after the development was launched in October 2009, the developer claimed to have sold a five bedroom duplex flat, on the "68th floor" of the 46-storey the building for HK$439 million (US$57m). The price, equating to US$9,200 per square foot, set the new world record for the most expensive apartment.

Due to selective numbering, a total of 42 intermediate floor numbers are missing from 39 Conduit Road: these include 14, 24, 34, 64, all floors between 40 and 59. The floor above the 68th is the 88th. The Democratic Party accused the developer of misleading; the Consumer Council recognised the accepted common practice of skipping the 13th and 14th floors, but suggested that developers "imaginary heights brought back to earth." Lee Shau Kee argued that buyers liked the numbering scheme.

=== 248 Queens Road East ===
A 40-storey building developed in 1998.

=== Grand Promenade ===
Grand Promenade is a high-rise residential development located at 38 Tai Hong Street, Sai Wan Ho. It is developed by Henderson Land Development and its subsidiary, The Hongkong and Yaumati Ferry Co Ltd. in 2005.

Grand Promenade is the tallest residential buildings and the third tallest building in Eastern District on Hong Kong Island, so it is one of the landmark buildings in the district.

== See also ==
- Murray Road Multi-storey Car Park Building
