= The Hong Kong and China Gas Company =

Public utility in Hong Kong

The Hong Kong & China Gas Co Ltd.
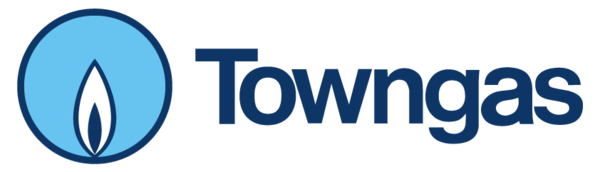

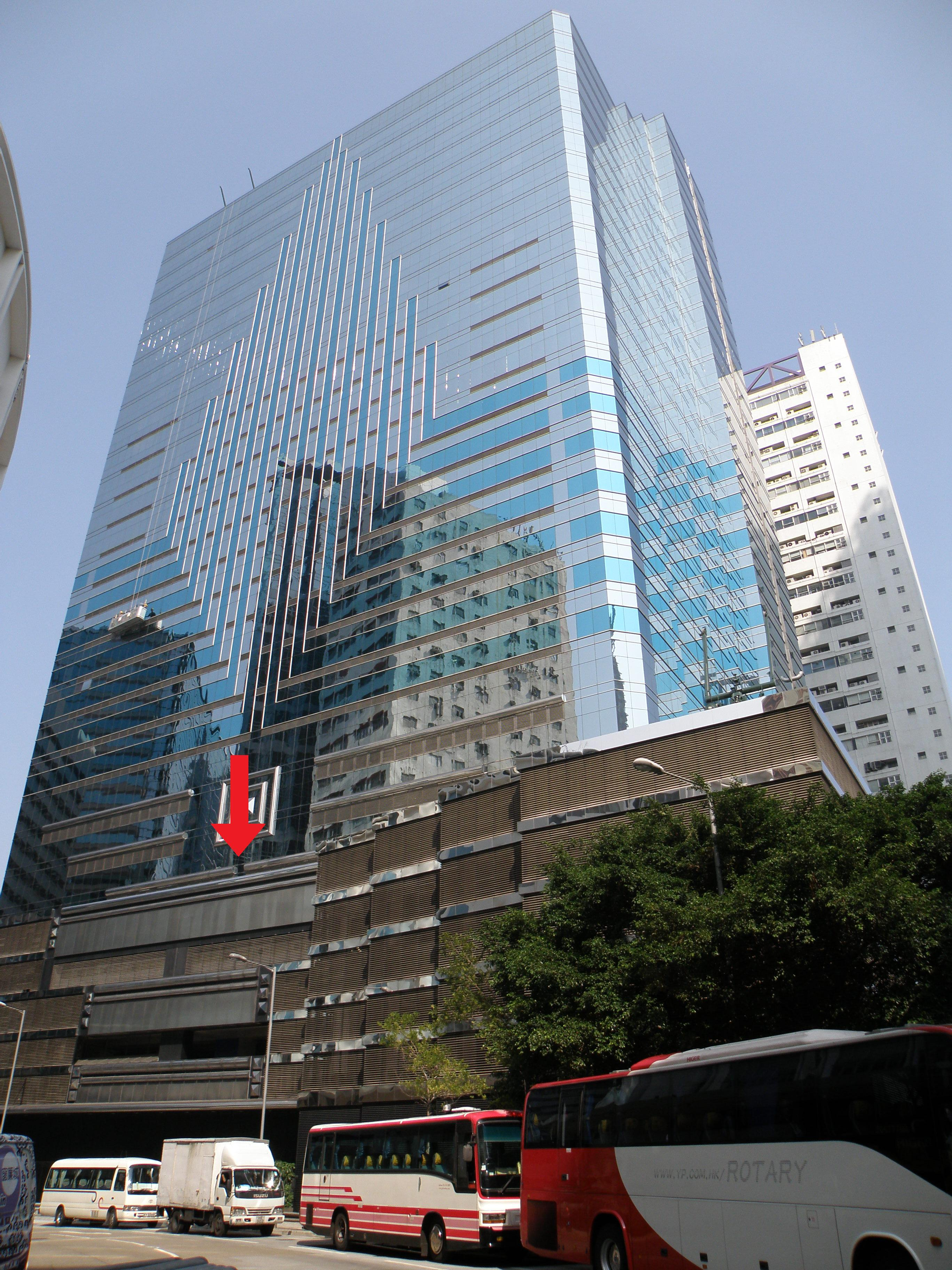
- Headquarters at North Point
- Trade name: Towngas
- Company type: Public
- Traded as: SEHK: 3; Hang Seng Index component
- Industry: Public utility
- Founded: Hong Kong (1862; 164 years ago)
- Headquarters: North Point, Hong Kong
- Key people: Peter Lee Ka-kit & Martin Lee Ka-shing, Chairmen; Peter Wong Wai-yee, Managing Director
- Products: Gas supply, water supply, emerging environmentally-friendly energy, telecommunications
- Revenue: HKD 40,927m(2020)
- Number of employees: 2,495 (2020)
- Website: towngas.com
- Footnotes / references 41.51% Associate of Henderson Land Development

The Hong Kong and China Gas Company Limited
- Traditional Chinese: 香港中華煤氣有限公司
- Simplified Chinese: 香港中华煤气有限公司
Transcriptions
Standard Mandarin
- Hanyu Pinyin: Xiānggǎng Zhōnghuá Méiqì Yǒuxiàngōngsī
Yue: Cantonese
- Yale Romanization: Hēung góng jūng wàh mùih hei yáuh haahn gūng sī
- Jyutping: Hoeng^{1} gong^{2} zung^{1} waa^{4} mui^{4} hei^{3} jau^{5} haan^{6} gung^{1} si^{1}

Towngas
- Traditional Chinese: 煤氣
- Simplified Chinese: 煤气
Transcriptions
Standard Mandarin
- Hanyu Pinyin: Méiqì
Yue: Cantonese
- Yale Romanization: Mùih hei
- Jyutping: Mui^{4} hei^{3}

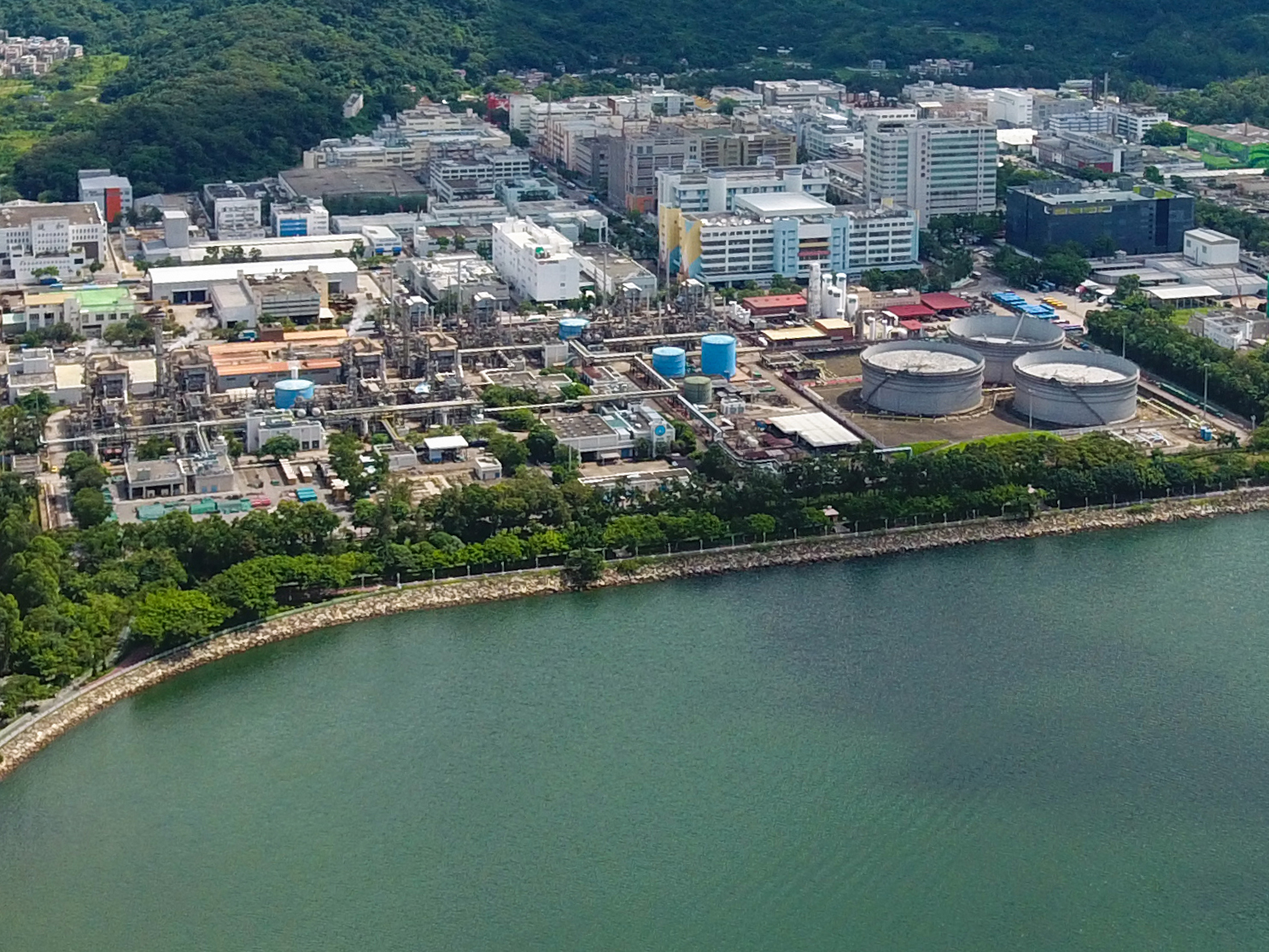
Towngas Tai Po Plant

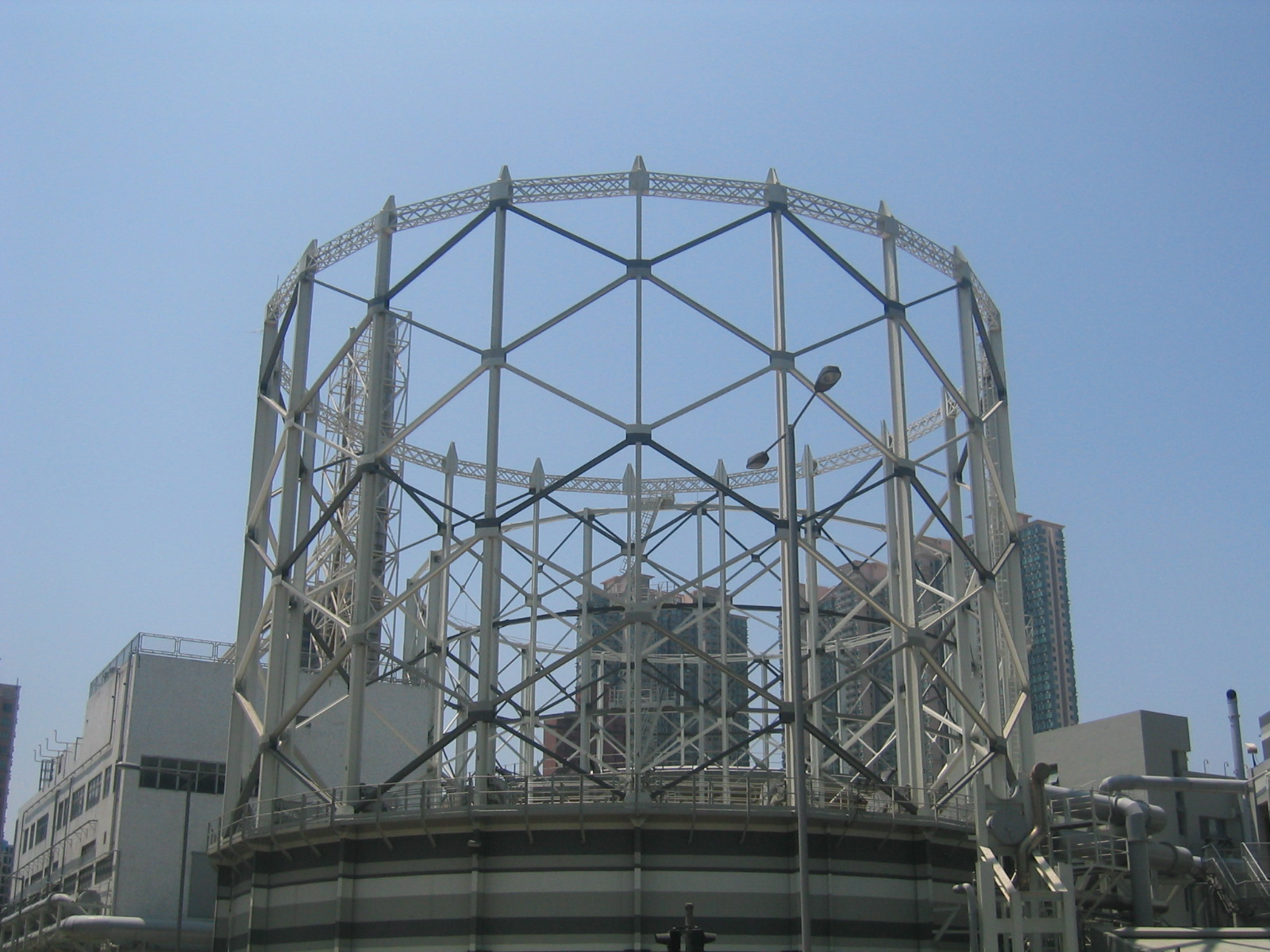
The gasometer of the company at Ma Tau Kok, Hong Kong.

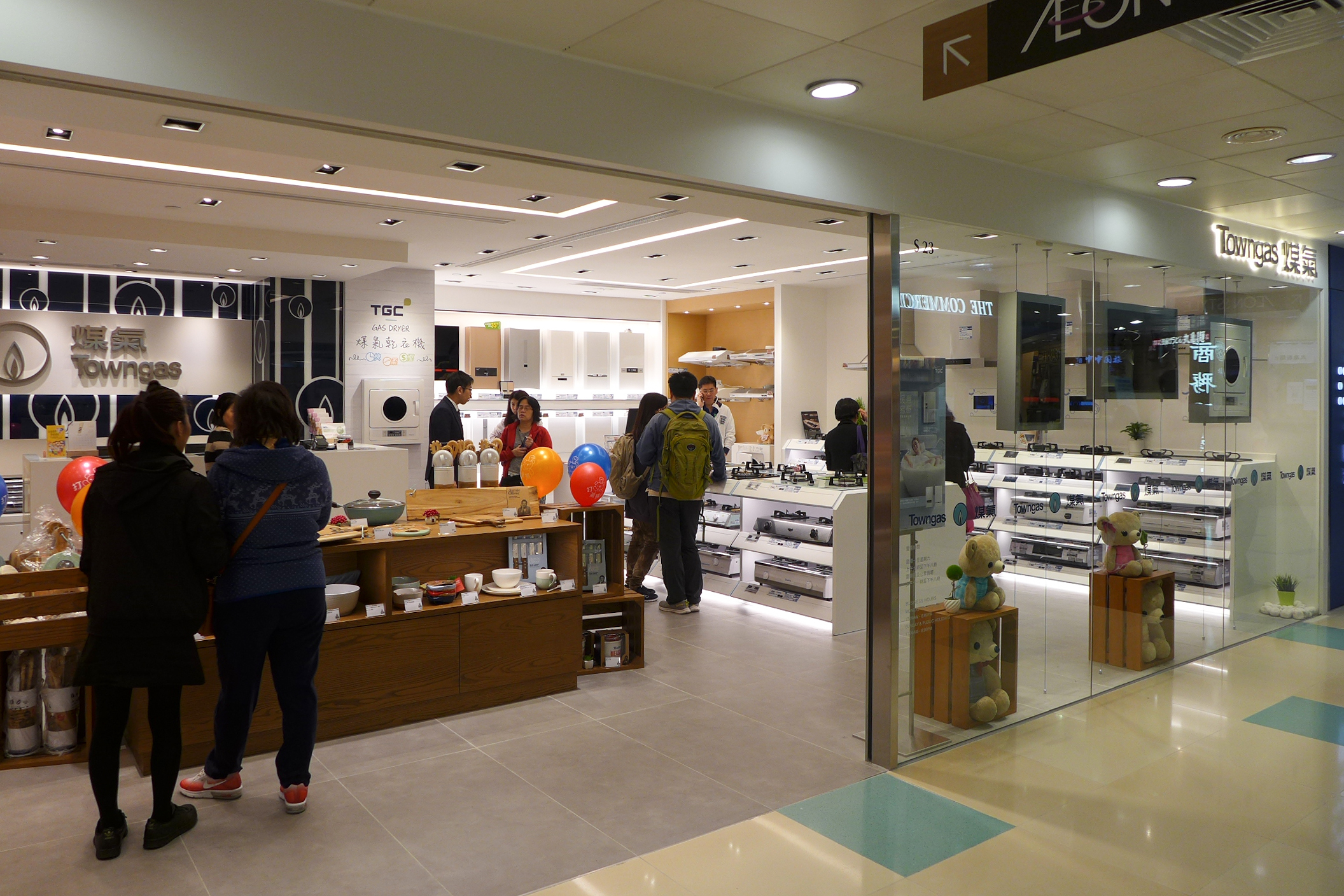
Towngas shop in Kornhill Plaza

The Hong Kong and China Gas Company Limited, trading as Towngas, is the sole provider of territory-wide town gas in Hong Kong. Founded in 1862, it is one of the oldest listed companies in the territory.

== History ==
In February 1862, the concession to supply gas to the city of Victoria (the centre of which now referred to as Central), was obtained from then governor Sir Hercules Robinson by William Glen, a newcomer to the gas industry. Incorporation took place on 3 June 1862 and, by 3 December 1864 that year, there were 15 miles (24 km) of pipes and 500 gas lamps along Queen's Road and Upper Valley Road. Across the harbour, residents in Kowloon continued to rely on candles and oil lamps until gas was laid on 28 years later. The company's original generating plant, the first in Asia, stood on the waterfront at West Point near Whitty Street and provided gas for lighting to government offices and army barracks as well as Jardine's offices, the Hong Kong Dispensary and the Hong Kong Hotel. The plant was coal fired and produced 120,000 cubic feet (3,400 m^{3}) of gas per day. It was run directly from Britain until 1954 when a majority shareholding was purchased by local firm Wheelock and Marden Company Limited who moved the company's registered domicile from the UK to Hong Kong.

As of 2024, the four gas lamps installed by the company are situated at the top and bottom of a flight of broad granite steps linking Ice House Street and Duddell Street. These are still maintained by Towngas, while the site is one of the Declared monuments of Hong Kong.

== Gas production and network ==
The company imports natural gas from Australia by sea and stores it at the Dapeng liquefied natural gas (LNG) terminal in Shenzhen under a 25-year contract. A 34-kilometre (21 mi) submarine pipeline connects the Dapeng terminal to Towngas' Tai Po plant. The Tai Po plant produces 97% of its town gas output while the remaining 3% is produced at the Ma Tau Kok plant. The two plants cover 1.8 million households via a network of more than 3,500 kilometres (2,200 mi) of pipelines throughout Hong Kong. Treated gas from landfill sites is also utilised as fuel to reduce emission of greenhouse gases. In Hong Kong, town gas is produced from naphtha and natural gas. Its major components are hydrogen (49%), methane (28.5%), carbon dioxide (19.5%) and a small amount of carbon monoxide (3%).

It supplies towngas to 85% Hong Kong households, and also to commercial and industrial customers. The group has over 500 projects in mainland China including city-gas, water supply, waste treatment, emerging environmentally-friendly energy and telecommunications.

== Property development ==
The company also engages in property development projects. It has a 15% share in the International Finance Centre and 50% share in Grand Promenade, both in Hong Kong, as well as the Grand Waterfront. All are investments in conjunction with the company's largest shareholder.

== Usurpation by ultimate parent ==
On 3 October 2007, Henderson Land Development Co. Ltd (HLD) proposed to pay market value only to gain control of Towngas. The 39.06 percent stake in Towngas held by subsidiary Henderson Investment was valued at HK$42.86 billion in cash and convertible notes for the purposes of the transaction. Minority shareholders of Henderson Investment, who together held 30.73%, would receive 204.1 million Henderson Land shares and HK$1.19 billion in cash.

The offer was considered by analysts to be favourable to the company, though shareholder activist David Webb criticised the deal saying Henderson was acquiring the stake on the cheap, without paying any control premium to minority shareholders of Henderson Investment. Webb further criticised the nature of the offer as a back-door privatisation of Henderson Investment, which would virtually be a shell company after the transfer of the stake.

On 7 November, Henderson sweetened the offer to appease minority shareholders by increasing the cash portion to HK$2.24 per share. On 7 December 2007, Henderson secured shareholders' support for the usurpation.

As of 31 December 2021, HLD was the company's largest shareholder, owning 41.53% of the issued shares of the company. Lee Ka Kit and Lee Ka Shing, chairmen of HLD, are also the chairmen of the company.

== Exploration operations ==
Towngas in 2008 agreed to a joint venture with Sunpec and Shaanxi Yanchang Petroleum to develop block 3113 in Madagascar with technical assistance from Yunnan Kaiyuan Oil and Gas. The venture discovered light oil in November 2009. This block along with block 2104 has estimated oil reserves of 5.6 billion barrels and natural gas reserves of 66 billion cubic metres.

== Accidents ==
On 14 May 1934, a huge explosion of a gasometer at the company's West Point plant killed 42, injured many more and gutted five buildings.

On 11 April 2006, an explosion caused by leaking towngas in Ngau Tau Kok killed two people and injured nine more.

== See also ==
- Henderson Land Development
- Towngas China
- Energy in Hong Kong

== Notes ==
A: Named after the plant's first manager, R.C. Whitty
