= Private housing estates in Hong Kong =

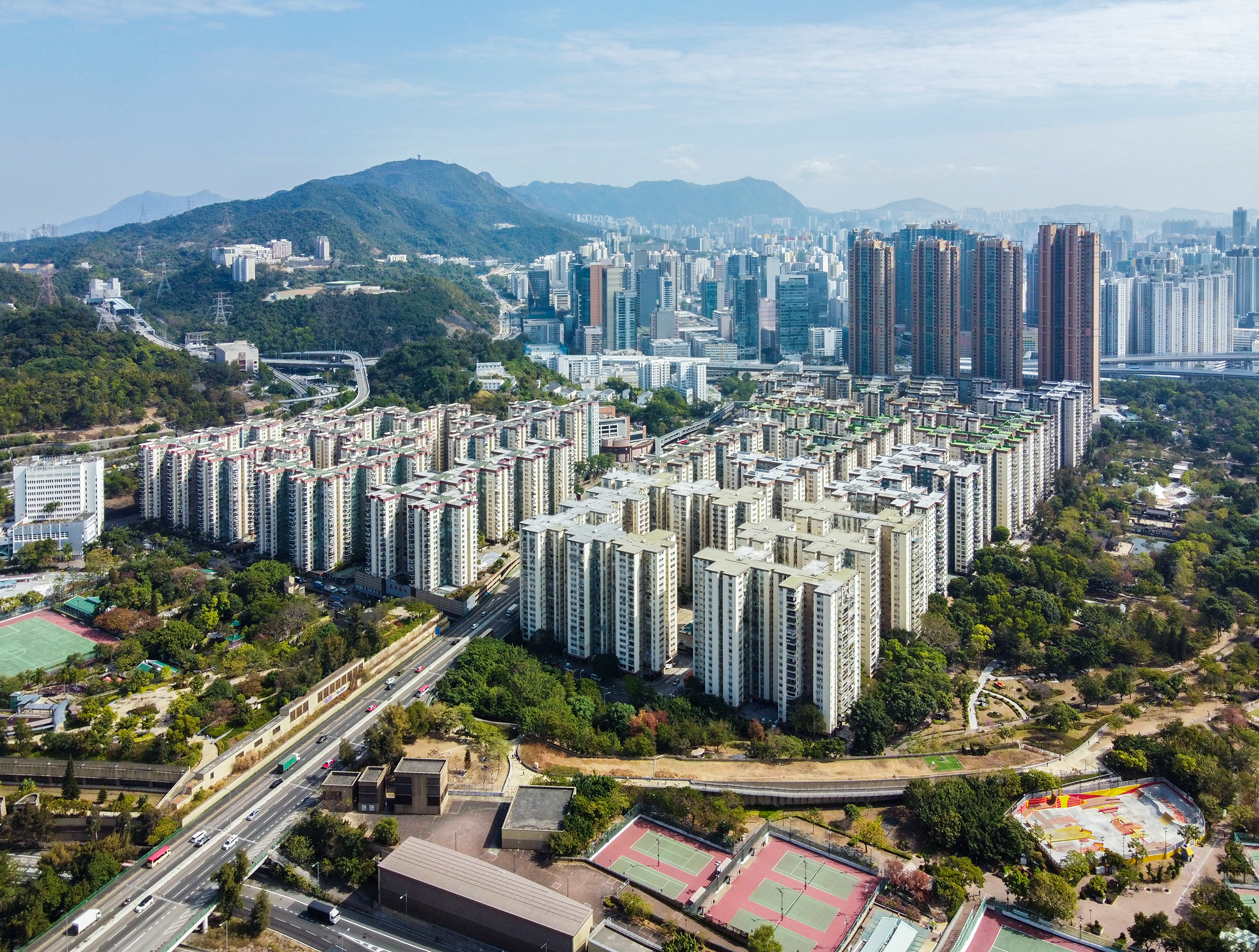
- Mei Foo Sun Chuen is the earliest and largest private housing estate in Hong Kong
- Chinese: 私人屋苑
Transcriptions
Standard Mandarin
- Hanyu Pinyin: Sīrén wū yuàn
Yue: Cantonese
- Yale Romanization: Sī yàhn ūk yún
- Jyutping: Si1 jan4 uk1 jyun2

Private housing estate is a term used in Hong Kong for private mass housing—a housing estate built by a private developer, as opposed to a public housing estate built by the Hong Kong Housing Authority or the Hong Kong Housing Society. It is usually characterised by a cluster of high-rise buildings, with its own market or shopping mall. Mei Foo Sun Chuen, built by Mobil, is the earliest (1965) and largest by number of blocks (99).

Early real estate development in Hong Kong followed the urban street pattern: single blocks packed along streets, most managed independently, with quality varying from block to block. Private housing estates, on the other hand, provide integrated management throughout the whole estate, attracting more affluent residents.

Mei Foo Sun Chuen, Taikoo Shing, Whampoa Garden, and City One Shatin are early notable examples. More projects followed, and the idea became widely accepted as the middle class of Hong Kong emerged.

== Wall effect ==
There has been controversy over the "wall effect" (Chinese: 屏風樓, literally "folding screen building") caused by uniform high-rise developments that adversely impact air circulation, leading to an aggravation of the urban heat effect while also impacting public hygiene and contributing to air pollution.

In 2006, the environmental group Green Sense has expressed concern that their survey on 155 housing estates found 104 have a "wall-like' design". It cited estates in Tai Kok Tsui and Tseung Kwan O as the "best examples".

Then-head of the planning department, Ava Ng, argued that the air ventilation factor had been taken into consideration with regard to the auction of all prime sites on the land application list, and mentioned that the erection of tall buildings at these sites would not create any "wall effect".

In May 2007, citing concern over developments in West Kowloon, and near Tai Wai and Yuen Long railway stations, Wong Kwok-hing, of the Hong Kong Federation of Trade Unions, put forward a motion calling for measures to reduce screen-like buildings that maximise good views at the expense of air flow in densely populated areas. The motion was vetoed by functional constituency representatives.

== Lists of estates ==
The following is a partial list of private housing estates in Hong Kong:

=== Hong Kong Island ===
Name	Chinese name	Area	Completed	No. blocks	No. units	Developer	Photo	Coordinates
Baguio Villa	碧瑤灣	Pok Fu Lam	1975–1979	21	1,535	New World Development		
Bel-Air	貝沙灣	Cyberport	2004 and 2008	32, with 47 individual houses	2,800	Pacific Century Premium Developments		22.2617°N 114.1301°E
The Belcher's	寶翠園	Shek Tong Tsui	2001	6	2,136	Shun Tak Holdings Ltd; Sun Hung Kai Properties; New World Development		
Beverly Hill	比華利山	Happy Valley	1988	10	698	Henderson Land Development; Hang Lung Properties		
City Garden	城市花園	North Point	1980s	14	2,393	Cheung Kong		22.28637°N 114.19152°E
39 Conduit Road	天匯	Mid-Levels	2009	1	66	Henderson Land Development		22.2816°N 114.1469°E
Grand Promenade	嘉亨灣	Sai Wan Ho	2006	5	2,020	Henderson Land Development; The Hongkong and Yaumati Ferry Co Ltd.		22.2850°N 114.2247°E
Heng Fa Chuen	杏花邨	Chai Wan	1982	48	6,504	MTR Corporation; Kerry Properties		22.2756°N 114.2416°E
Highcliff	曉盧	Happy Valley	2003	1	113	Central Development Limited		22°15′54″N 114°11′3″E
Hong Kong Parkview	陽明山莊	Tai Tam	1989	18	984	Chyau Fwu		22.2575°N 114.1996°E
Island Resort	藍灣半島	Chai Wan	2001	4	3,098	Sino Land		22.2655°N 114.2512°E
Kornhill	康怡花園	Quarry Bay	1986	44	8,831	Hang Lung Properties; New World Development; MTR Properties		22.282778°N 114.216389°E
The Leighton Hill	禮頓山	Happy Valley	2002	8	544	Sun Hung Kai Properties		
Les Saisons	逸濤灣	Sai Wan Ho	2001	4	864	Swire Properties; China Motor Bus; Sun Hung Kai Properties		
Nam Fung Sun Chuen	南豐新邨	Quarry Bay	1978	12	2,826	Nam Fung Group		22.2829°N 114.2134°E
Opus Hong Kong	傲璇	Stubbs Road	2012	1	12	Swire Properties		22.2693°N 114.1742°E
Redhill Peninsula	紅山半島	Tai Tam	1990 and 1992	4	490	Sino Land; Chinachem		
South Horizons	海怡半島	Ap Lei Chau	1990s	34	9,812	Hutchison Whampoa Property		22.2433°N 114.1475°E
Taikoo Shing	太古城	Quarry Bay	1980s	61	12,698	Swire		22.2863°N 114.2176°E

=== Kowloon ===
Name	Chinese name	Area	Completed	No. blocks	No. units	Developer	Photo	Coordinates
Amoy Gardens	淘大花園	Ngau Tau Kok	1987	19	4,896	Hang Lung Properties		22.3244°N 114.2165°E
The Arch	凱旋門	Union Square	2006	4	1,054	Sun Hung Kai Properties		22°18′13″N 114°9′47″E
The Cullinan	天璽	Union Square	2008	2	825	Sun Hung Kai Properties		22°18′19.4″N 114°09′38.8″E
Grand Waterfront	翔龍灣	Ma Tau Kok	2006	5	1782	Henderson Land Development; Hong Kong and China Towngas		
The Harbourfront Landmark	海名軒	Hung Hom	2001	3	324	Cheung Kong Holdings		22°18′12″N 114°11′35″E
The Harbourside	君臨天下	Union Square	2004	3	1,122	Hang Lung Properties; MTR Corporation		22°18′11.0″N 114°9′42.0″E
Island Harbourview	維港灣	Tai Kok Tsui	2000	9	2,314	MTR Corporation; Sino Land; Bank of China (Hong Kong); Kerry Properties; China Overseas Land and Investment		
Laguna City	麗港城	Lam Tin	1991	38	8,072	Cheung Kong; Hutchison Whampoa Property		22.2850°N 114.1588°E
The Long Beach	浪澄灣	Tai Kok Tsui	2006	8	1,829	Hang Lung Properties		
Manhattan Hill	曼克頓山	Lai Chi Kok	2007	5	1,115	Sun Hung Kai Properties		
The Masterpiece	名鑄	Tsim Sha Tsui	2007	1	345	New World Development; Urban Renewal Authority		22°17′51″N 114°10′26″E
Mei Foo Sun Chuen	美孚新邨	Lai Chi Kok	1965	99	13,500	Mobil		22.3380°N 114.1390°E
Parc Oasis	又一居	Yau Yat Chuen	1995	32	1,822	Wheelock & Co. Sino Group		22.3339°N 114.1740°E
Royal Peninsula	半島豪庭	Hung Hom	2001	5	1,669	Sun Hung Kai Properties; Henderson Land		22°18′17″N 114°11′02″E
Sceneway Garden	匯景花園	Lam Tin	1992	17	4,112	Cheung Kong; Hutchison Whampoa Property		22.3069°N 114.2327°E
Telford Gardens	德福花園	Ngau Tau Kok	1980	41	4,992	Mass Transit Railway Corporation; Hang Lung Properties; Hopewell Holdings		22.3247°N 114.2122°E
Victoria Towers	港景峰	Tsim Sha Tsui	2003	3	988	Cheung Kong; Hutchison Whampoa Property		
Whampoa Garden	黃埔花園	Hung Hom	1980s	88	10,431	Whampoa Dockyards; Hutchison Whampoa Property		22.3041°N 114.1922°E

=== Kwai Tsing District ===
Name	Chinese name	Area	Completed	No. blocks	No. units	Developer	Photo	Coordinates
Greenfield Garden	翠怡花園	Tsing Yi	1990	11	3,216	Sun Hung Kai Properties		
Mayfair Gardens	美景花園	Tsing Yi	1984	8	1,912	Sun Hung Kai Properties		
Rambler Crest	藍澄灣	Tsing Yi	2003	5	1,587	Cheung Kong		
Tierra Verde	盈翠半島	Tsing Yi	1999	12	3,459	MTR Corporation		
Tsing Yi Garden	青怡花園	Tsing Yi	1986	7	1,520	Cheung Kong		
Villa Esplanada	灝景灣	Tsing Yi	2000	10	2,824	Sun Hung Kai Properties; Cheung Kong; China Resources		
Wonderland Villas	華景山莊	Kwai Chung	1984 and 1987	22	1,502	Sun Hung Kai Properties; Henderson Land Development		22.307°N 114.233°E

=== Sai Kung District ===
Name	Chinese name	Area	Completed	No. blocks	No. units	Developer	Photo	Coordinates
The Grandiose	君傲灣	Tseung Kwan O	2006	3	1,472	New World Development		22.1830°N 114.1541°E
LOHAS Park	日出康城	Lohas Park	2008–ongoing	78	23,132	MTR Corporation and others		22.295°N 114.271°E
The Beaumount	峻瀅	Lohas Park	2013–2016	9	2,649	Cheung Kong		22.1751°N 114.1630°E
Manor Hill	海茵莊園	Lohas Park	2022	2	1,556	Kowloon Development and others	[	22.1747°N 114.1625°E
Ocean Shores	維景灣畔	Tiu Keng Leng	2001–2003	17	5,728	Swire Properties; Sun Hung Kai Properties		22.3024°N 114.2532°E
Metro Town	都會駅	Tiu Keng Leng	2006–2007	9	3,771	Nan Fung/MTR/Cheung Kong		22.1817°N 114.1507°E
Oscar by the Sea	清水灣半島	Pak Shing Kok	2002	7	1,959	Sun Hung Kai Properties		22.1826°N 114.1600°E
East Point City	東港城	Hang Hau	1997	7	2,184	Sun Hung Kai Properties		22.1858°N 114.1555°E
La Cite Noble	新寶城	Hang Hau	1999	6	2,184	Henderson Land Development		22.1850°N 114.1558°E
Residence Oasis	蔚藍灣畔	Hang Hau	2004	6	2,133	Sino Land/MTR/Kerry Properties		22.1856°N 114.1553°E
Nan Fung Plaza	南豐廣場	Hang Hau	1999	5	1,614	Bright Region and others		22.1852°N 114.1550°E
Maritime Bay	海悅豪園	Hang Hau	1998	2	736	Sino Land		22.1852°N 114.1556°E
Tseung Kwan O Plaza	將軍澳廣場	Tseung Kwan O	2004	8	2,880	Nan Fung Group		22.3089°N 114.2621°E
The Papillons	海翩匯	Tseung Kwan O	2018	11	857	Chinacheng Group		22.1812°N 114.1545°E
Savannah		Tseung Kwan O	2017	13	804	Wheelock		22.1820°N 114.1551°E
Monterey		Tseung Kwan O	2018	34	926	Wheelock		22.1809°N 114.1545°E
Alto Residences	藍塘傲	Tseung Kwan O	2018	30	605	Lai Sung Group/Empire Group		22.1809°N 114.1529°E
Capri		Tseung Kwan O	2017	23	428	Wheelock		22.1810°N 114.1525°E
The Wings	天晉	Tseung Kwan O	2011-2017	41	3,726	Sun Hung Kai		22.1828°N 114.1533°E
Corinthia by the Sea	帝景灣	Tseung Kwan O	2016	7	536	Sino Land/K.Wah		22.1813°N 114.1534°E
Park Central	將軍澳中心	Tseung Kwan O	2002-2005	12	4,542	MTR and others		22.1825°N 114.1525°E
The Parkside		Tseung Kwan O	2015	5	591	Wheelock		22.1819°N 114.1538°E
Twin Peaks	嘉悅	Tseung Kwan O	2016	2	372	K.Wah		22.1816°N 114.1539°E
Metro City	新都城	Po Lam	1996-2000	21	6,768	Henderson Land Development		22.1920°N 114.1524°E
Well On Garden	慧安園	Po Lam	1994	4	1,280	Nan Fung Group		22.1926°N 114.1513°E
Finery Park	富麗花園	Po Lam	1994	2	688	Henderson Land Development		22.1925°N 114.1515°E
Serenity Place	怡心園	Po Lam	1999	5	1,526	Hong Kong Housing Society		22.1920°N 114.1512°E
Radiant Towers	旭輝臺	Po Lam	1998	2	704	Hong Kong Housing Society		22.1923°N 114.1516°E

=== Sha Tin District ===
Name	Chinese name	Area	Completed	No. blocks	No. units	Developer	Photo	Coordinates
Belair Gardens	富豪花園	Sha Tin	1982 and 1987	14	1,940	Chinachem Group		22.384722°N 114.198694°E
Castello	帝堡城	Sha Tin	1999	8	1,744	Sun Hung Kai Properties		22.3837°N 114.2153°E
City One	沙田第一城	Sha Tin	1981–1988	52	10,642	New World Development; Henderson Land Development; Sun Hung Kai Properties; Cheung Kong Holdings		22.386389°N 114.203889°E
Double Cove	迎海	Ma On Shan	2013–2015	21	3,500			
Festival City	名城	Tai Wai	2010–2012	12	4,304	Cheung Kong Holdings; MTR Corporation		22.3692°N 114.1743°E
Garden Vista	翠湖花園	Shek Mun	1990	6	840			22.39329°N 114.20679°E
Glamour Garden	金輝花園	Tai Wai						
Golden Lion Gardens	金獅花園	Tai Wai						
Grandeur Garden	金禧花園	Tai Wai						
The Great Hill	嘉御山	Tai Wai						
Greenview Garden	愉景花園	Tai Wai						
Julimount Garden	瑞峰花園	Tai Wai						
Lake Silver	銀湖·天峰	Ma On Shan	2009	7	2,169			
Lakeview Gardens	湖景花園	Tai Wai						
Man Lai Court	文禮閣	Tai Wai	1990–1993	4		Cheung Kong Holdings		
Parc Royale	聚龍居	Tai Wai						
Peak One	壹號雲頂	Tai Wai						
Pristine Villa	曉翠山莊	Tai Wai	1995	14	498	Sun Hung Kai Properties		
Royal Ascot	駿景園	Fo Tan	1995–1997	10		Sun Hung Kai Properties; Kowloon-Canton Railway Corporation		22.3991°N 114.2010°E
Sha Tin Heights	沙田嶺	Tai Wai						
Sunshine City	新港城	Ma On Shan	1990s	20	4,761	Henderson Land Development		22.4244°N 114.2321°E
Villa Athena	雅典居	Ma On Shan	1994	10	1,064			
Worldwide Gardens	世界花園	Tai Wai						

=== Tsuen Wan District ===
Name	Chinese name	Area	Completed	No. blocks	No. units	Developer	Photo	Coordinates
Allway Gardens	荃威花園	Tsuen Wan	1978 and 1981	16	3,423	Hopewell Holdings		22.3788°N 114.1078°E
Bayview Garden	灣景花園	Tsuen Wan	1993	5	1,200	Hang Lung Properties		22.369702°N 114.099369°E
Belvedere Garden	麗城花園	Tsuen Wan West	1987–1991	19	6,016	Cheung Kong Holdings		22.3719°N 114.1020°E
City Point	環宇海灣	Tsuen Wan	2014	7	1,717	Cheung Kong Holdings; Nan Fung; MTR Corporation		
Discovery Park	愉景新城	Tsuen Wan	1998	12	3,360	Hong Kong Resort Company		
The Dynasty	御凱	Tsuen Wan	2009	2	256	Sino Land; Urban Renewal Authority		22.36793°N 114.11411°E
Luk Yeung Sun Chuen	綠楊新邨	Tsuen Wan	1984	17	4,056	Mass Transit Railway Corporation and others		22.3736°N 114.1199°E
Riviera Gardens	海濱花園	Tsuen Wan	1990	20	5,692	Caltex; New World Development		
Serenade Cove	韻濤居	Tsuen Wan West	2001	3	792	The Wharf (Holdings)		22.3725°N 114.1031°E
Tsuen King Garden	荃景花園	Tsuen Wan	1988	12	3,024			
Tsuen Wan Centre	荃灣中心	Tsuen Wan	1989	20	5,692			
Vision City	萬景峯	Tsuen Wan West	2007	5	1,446	Urban Renewal Authority		
Waterside Plaza	海灣花園	Tsuen Wan	1991	4	822			

==== Sham Tseng ====
Name	Chinese name	Area	Completed	No. blocks	No. units	Developer	Photo	Coordinates
Bellagio	碧堤半島	Sham Tseng				Wheelock & Co. New Asia Realty; Wharf Holdings		22.36698°N 114.06129°E
Lido Garden	麗都花園	Sham Tseng						
Ocean Pointe	縉皇居	Sham Tseng	2001	1	560	Kerry Properties		22.3657°N 114.0624°E
Rhine Garden	海韻花園	Sham Tseng						
Rhine Terrace	海韻臺	Sham Tseng	1992	1	212	Cheung Kong Holdings		
Sea Crest Villa	浪翠園	Sham Tseng; Tsing Lung Tau	1992–1997	15	2,409	Sun Hung Kai Properties		22.3663°N 114.0560°E

=== Tuen Mun District ===
Name	Chinese name	Area	Completed	No. blocks	No. units	Developer	Photo	Coordinates
Miami Beach Towers	邁亞美海灣	Tuen Mun	1991	6	1,272	Sino Group		22.3719°N 113.9695°E
Pierhead Garden	海翠花園	Tuen Mun	1988	6	1,432	Kowloon–Canton Railway Corporation		22.3725°N 113.9666°E
Sun Tuen Mun Centre	新屯門中心	Tuen Mun	1990	10	3,500	Kowloon–Canton Railway Corporation		22.3812°N 113.9650°E
Tai Hing Gardens	大興花園	Tuen Mun	1994	15	3,647	Hang Lung Properties		22.3996°N 113.9715°E
Tuen Mun Town Plaza	屯門市廣場	Tuen Mun	1992	8	1,968	Sino Group		22.3929°N 113.9767°E

==== So Kwun Wat ====
Name	Chinese name	Area	Completed	No. blocks	No. units	Developer	Photo	Coordinates
Aegean Coast	愛琴海岸	So Kwun Wat	2002	7	1,624	Sun Hung Kai Properties; The Luk Hoi Tong Company; Henderson Land Development		22.3724°N 113.9950°E
Avignon	星堤	So Kwun Wat	2011	40	459	Sun Hung Kai Properties		22.3757°N 114.0003°E
The Bloomsway	滿名山	So Kwun Wat	2017	63	1,101	Kerry Properties		22.3772°N 113.9861°E
Emerald Bay	恆大‧珺瓏灣	So Kwun Wat	2021	8	1,982	China Evergrande		22.3731°N 113.9997°E
Hong Kong Gold Coast	香港黃金海岸	So Kwun Wat	1990–1993	20	2,052	Sino Group		22.3673°N 113.9944°E
NAPA	洋房	So Kwun Wat	2017	67	460	Wheelock & Co.		22.3732°N 114.0025°E
OMA OMA		So Kwun Wat	2021	4	466	Wing Tai Properties		22.3720°N 114.0008°E
Le Pont	上源	So Kwun Wat	2020	40	1,154	Vanke Property		22.3727°N 114.0012°E
Seacoast Royale	帝御‧金灣	So Kwun Wat	2022	2	611	Henderson Land Development		22.3743°N 113.9910°E
Spring Seaview Terrace	春和海景花園	So Kwun Wat	1990	3	82			22.3733°N 113.9869°E

=== Yuen Long District ===
Name	Chinese name	Area	Completed	No. blocks	No. units	Developer	Photo	Coordinates
Central Park Towers	栢慧豪園	Tin Shui Wai	2010	8	2,960	Cheung Kong Holdings		22.4593°N 114.0011°E
Kingswood Villas	嘉湖山莊	Tin Shui Wai	1991–1999	58	15,808	Cheung Kong Holdings		22.4600°N 114.0049°E
Sun Yuen Long Centre	新元朗中心	Yuen Long	1993	5		Sun Hung Kai Properties; Kowloon-Canton Railway Corporation		22.4455°N 114.0351°E
Vianni Cove	慧景軒	Tin Shui Wai	2004	3	1,091	Cheung Kong Holdings; Sun Hung Kai Properties		22.4661°N 114.0041°E
YOHO Town	新時代廣場	Yuen Long	2004; 2010	16	4,091	Sun Hung Kai Properties		22.4422°N 114.0368°E

== See also ==
- Housing in Hong Kong
- List of most expensive houses in Hong Kong
