= Harbour Place =

Private housing estate in Kowloon, Hong Kong

Coordinates: 22.30327°N 114.18592°E

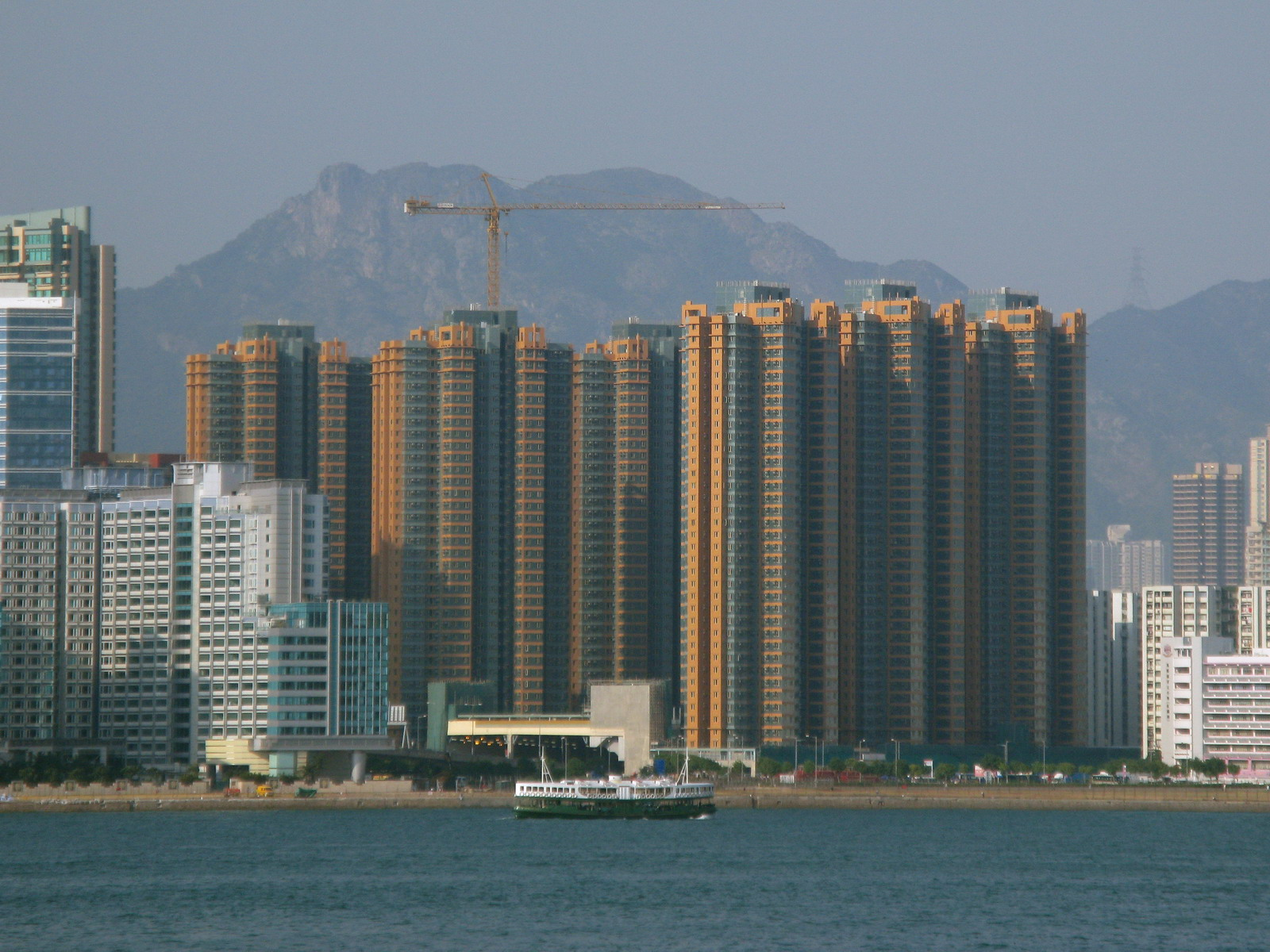
Harbour Place under renovation in November 2007

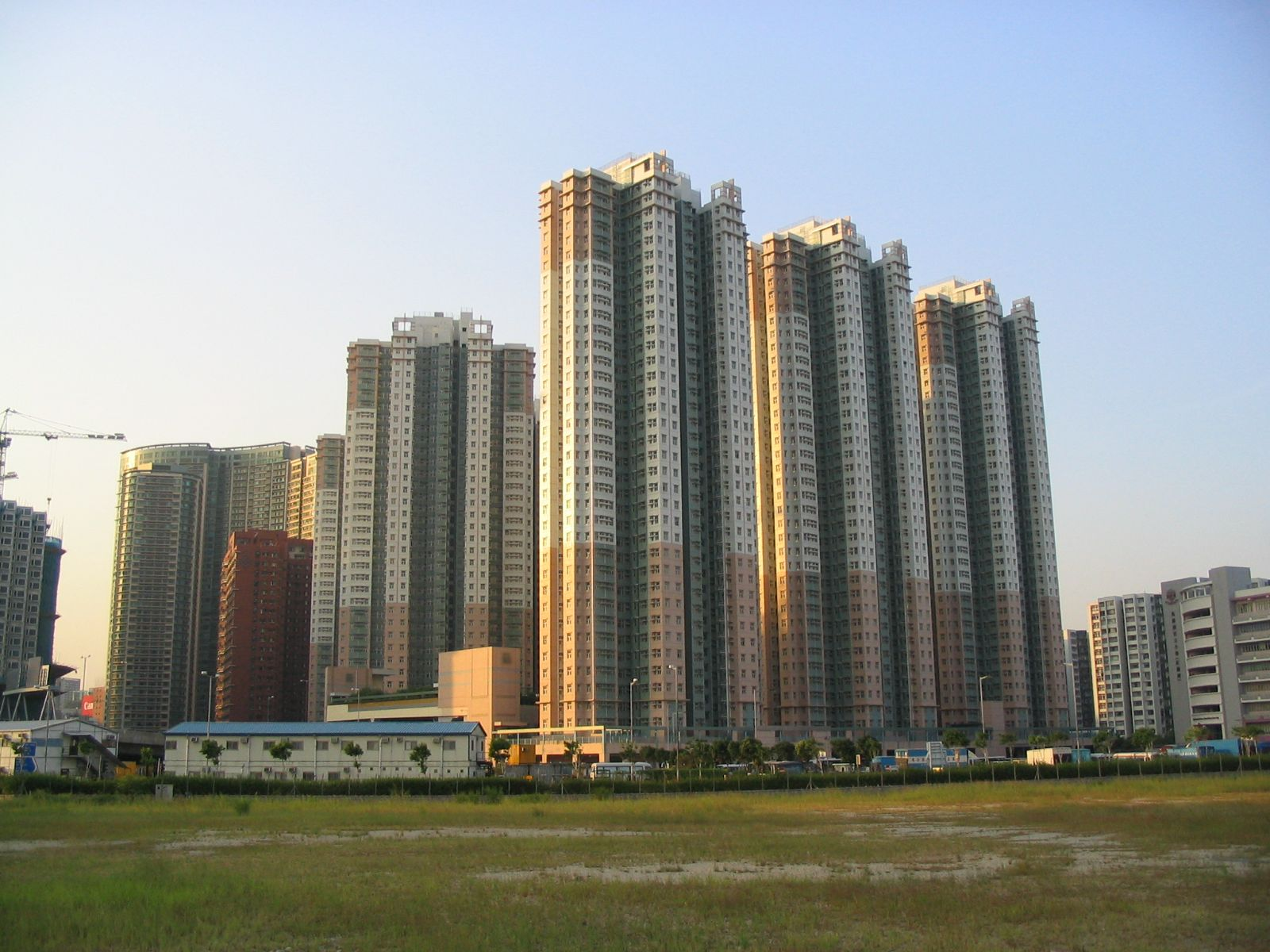
Hunghom Peninsula in October 2004, before being redeveloped into Harbour Place

Harbour Place (Chinese: 海濱南岸) is a private housing estate in Hung Hom, Kowloon, Hong Kong.

== History ==
=== Hunghom Peninsula ===
Formerly called Hunghom Peninsula (紅灣半島) and built on the reclaimed land of Hung Hom Bay, it was an HOS estate comprising 2,470 flats completed by the Hong Kong government in 2002.

=== Harbour Place ===
Since the government decided to suspend the scheme, Hunghom Peninsula was sold to Sun Hung Kai Properties and New World Development in February 2004. In November 2004, the developers decided to demolish and rebuild the buildings. The environmentalists, legislators and citizens were worried about the waste pollution and strongly opposed the plan. One month later, due to public concerns, the developers decided not to demolish the buildings and renovate existing flats and upgrade facilities instead. In 2008, the extensive renovation and refurbishment of what was once a public housing estate into a luxury residential complex was completed, the flats renamed to Harbour Place (海濱南岸) and were sold to the public.

== Property description and facilities ==
Harbour Place comprises seven towers with a 64,000 square feet (5,900 m^{2}) clubhouse with food and beverage service and an independent shopping arcade. Harbour Place also offers a bowling alley, games room, movie theater, karaoke room, gym, basketball, tennis, badminton courts and both indoor and outdoor swimming pools.

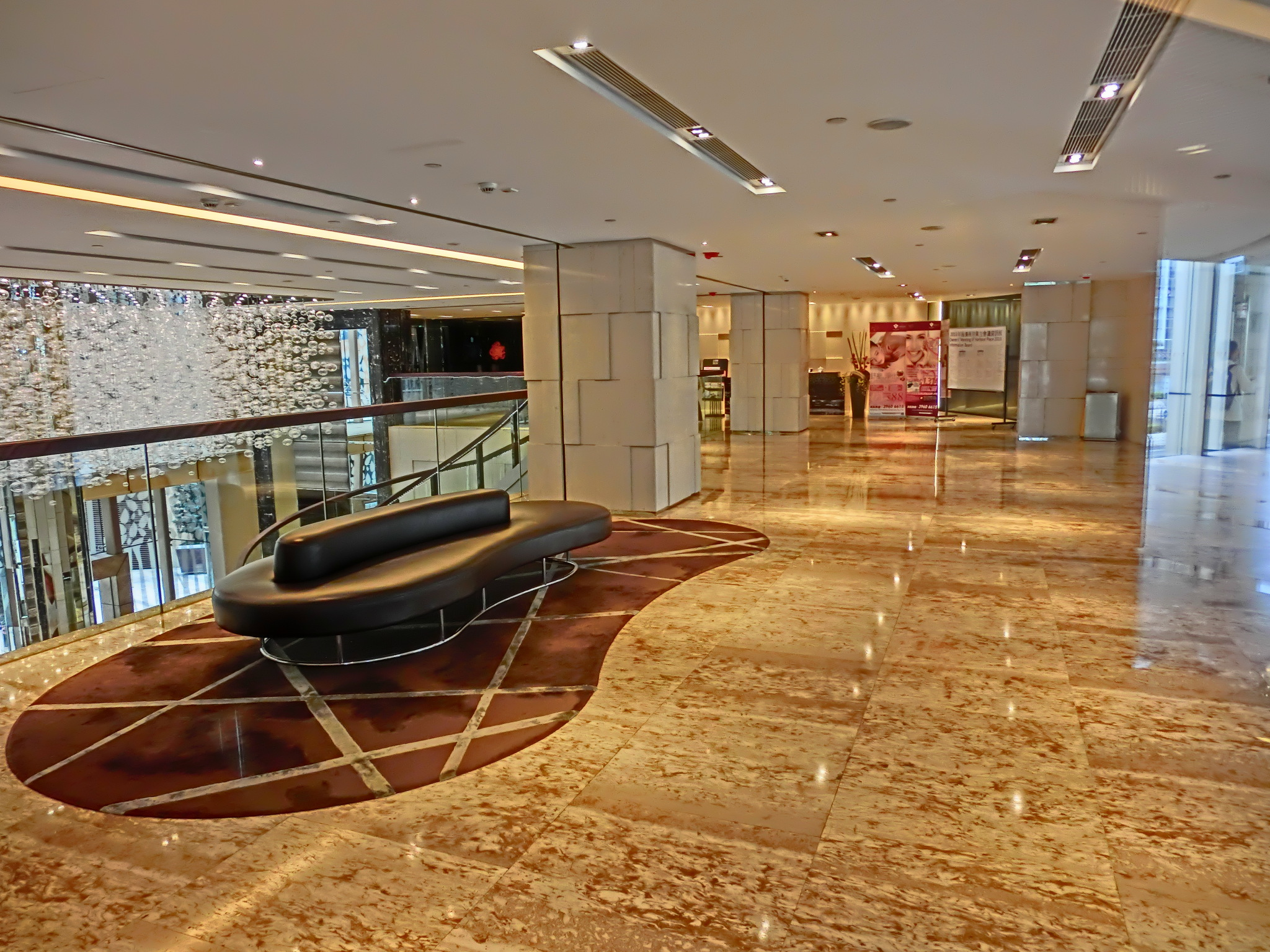
Clubhouse interior in March 2013

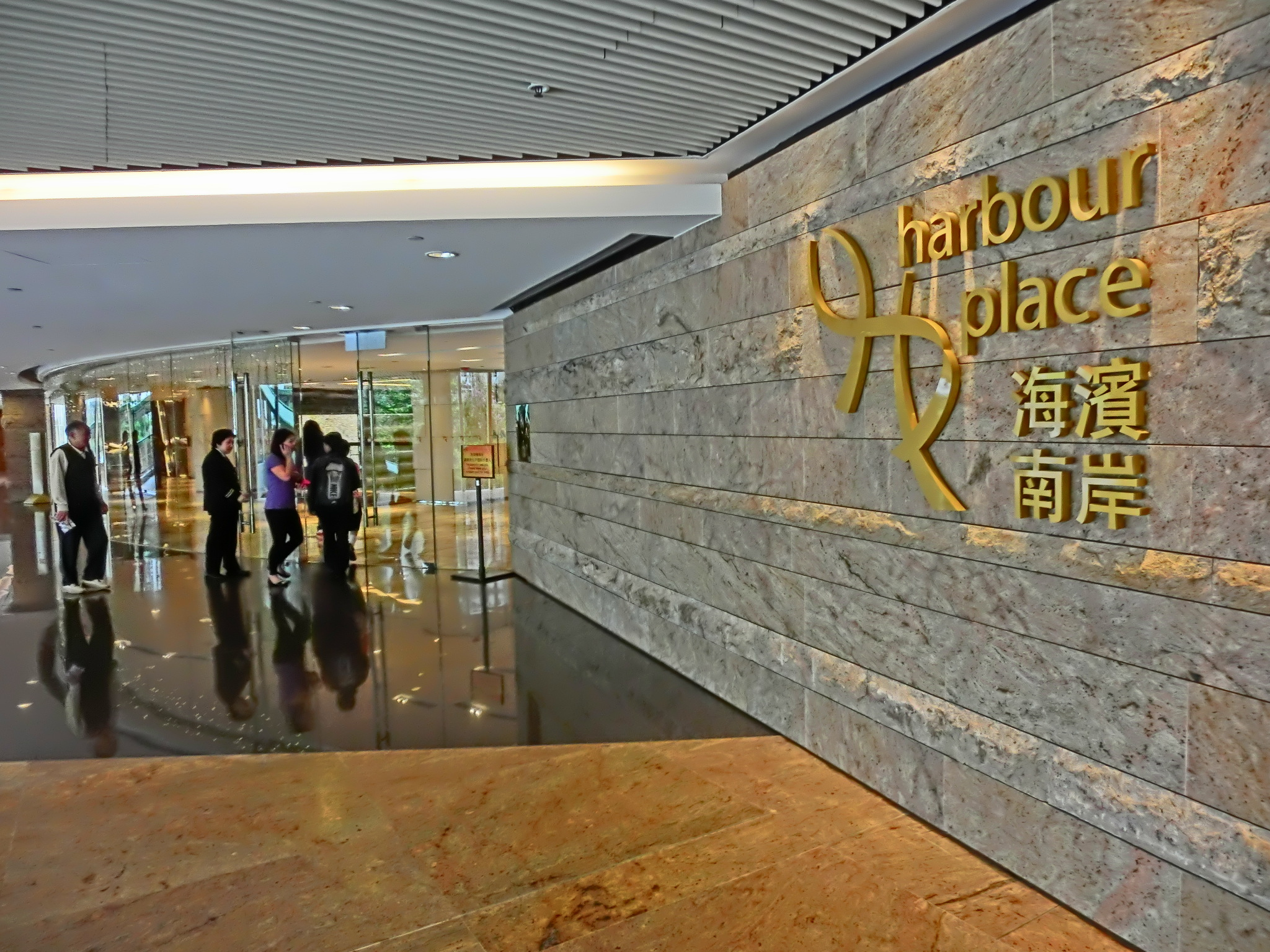
Clubhouse entrance in March 2013

== Leung Chin-man appointment controversy ==
In August 2008, Leung Chin-man, former Permanent Secretary for Housing, Planning and Lands (Housing) and Director of Housing, joined New World China Land as executive director and vice-chairman of the company. This raised public concern on conflict of interest since Leung involved in the deal of Hung Hom Peninsula with New World China Land's parent company, New World Development, during his term of service. The Government and Legislative Council also involved in investigating Leung's case. One week later, New World China Land announced to terminate employment contract with Leung without any compensation.

== See also ==
- Hung Hom station
- Royal Peninsula
