= Hung Hom Bay (constituency) =

Constituency of Hong Kong

- Elected constituency for the Kowloon City District Council
- Boundary of Hung Hom Bay in Kowloon City District
- District: Kowloon City
- Legislative Council constituency: Kowloon Central
- Population: 18,414 (2019)
- Electorate: 8,940 (2019)

Current constituency
- Created: 1994
- Number of members: One
- Member: Vacant
- Created from: Hung Hom South

Hung Hom Bay (Chinese: 紅磡灣) is one of the 25 constituencies in the Kowloon City District of Hong Kong which was created in 2015.

The constituency loosely covers areas of Royal Peninsula and Whampoa Estate in Hung Hom with the estimated population of 18,414.

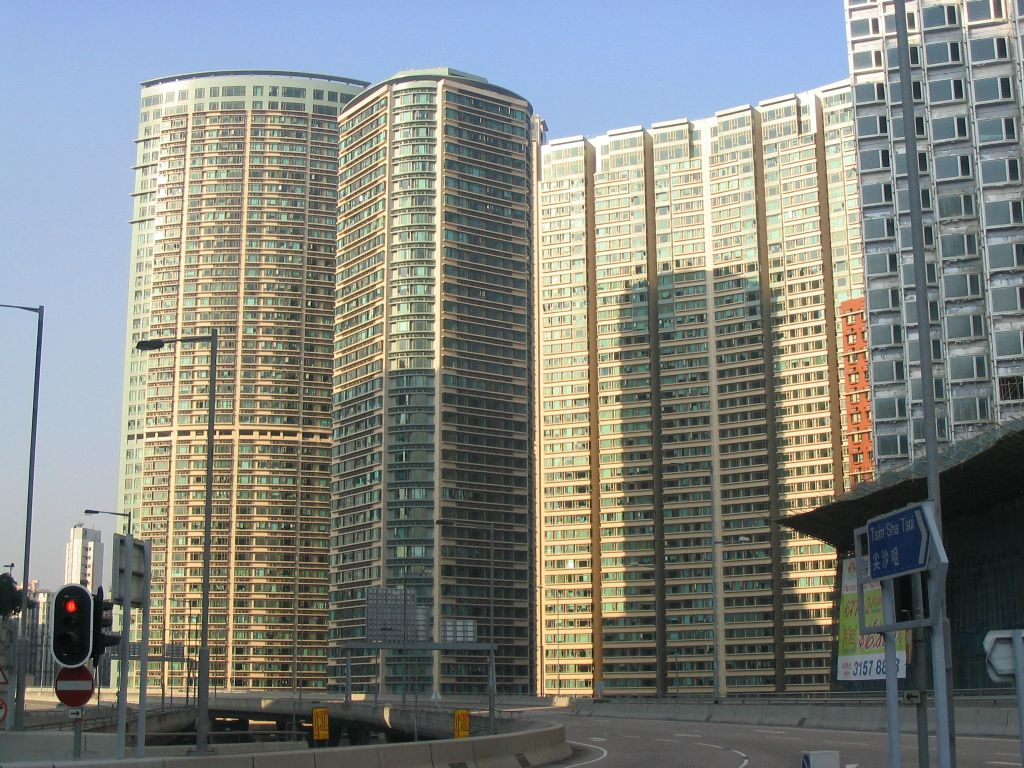
Royal Peninsula

== Councillors represented ==
Election	Member	Party
1994	Virginia Fung King-man	Democratic
2007 by-election	Cheung Yan-hong	Independent
201?	Cheung Yan-hong	KWND/BPA
2019	Pius Yum Kwok-tung→Vacant (Note: Disqualified on 28 September 2021.)	Democratic

== Election results ==
=== 2010s ===
Kowloon City District Council Election, 2019: Hung Hom Bay
Party	Candidate	Votes	%	±%
Democratic	Pius Yum Kwok-tung	3,554	55.44	
Nonpartisan	Jack Wong Chi	2,688	41.93	
Nonpartisan	Lam Tsz-yan	178	2.78	
Majority		866	13.51	
Turnout		6,445	72.12	
Democratic gain from Nonpartisan		Swing		

Kowloon City District Council Election, 2015: Hung Hom Bay
Party	Candidate	Votes	%	±%
Independent	Cheung Yan-hong	1,811	48.16	−27.54
Labour	Chiu Shi-shun	1,740	46.28	
Nonpartisan	Virginia Fung King-man	162	4.31	
Nonpartisan	Calvin Li Kam-cheong	47	1.25	
Majority		71	1.88	
Turnout		3,760	46.23	
Independent hold		Swing		

Kowloon City District Council Election, 2011: Hung Hom Bay
Party	Candidate	Votes	%	±%
Independent	Cheung Yan-hong	1,994	75.70	+16.22
People Power	Foo Wai-lok	640	24.30	
Majority		1,354	51.40	
Turnout		2,634	32.57	
Independent hold		Swing		

=== 2000s ===
Kowloon City District Council Election, 2007: Hung Hom Bay
Party	Candidate	Votes	%	±%
Independent	Cheung Yan-hong	1,537	59.48	−11.16
Independent	Cheung Hon-yeung	744	28.79	
Nonpartisan	Fung Siu-lung	303	11.73	
Majority		793	30.69	
Independent hold		Swing		

Hung Hom Bay by-election 2007
Party	Candidate	Votes	%	±%
Independent	Cheung Yan-hong	1,216	72.64	
Independent	Chau Chung-leung	458	27.36	
Majority		758	45.20	
Independent gain from Democratic		Swing		

Kowloon City District Council Election, 2003: Hung Hom Bay
Party	Candidate	Votes	%	±%
Democratic	Virginia Fung King-man	1,513	46.61	−7.43
ADPL	Fung Siu-lung	890	27.42	
Nonpartisan	Lam Ying-lung	843	25.97	
Majority		623	19.19	
Democratic hold		Swing		

Kowloon City District Council Election, 1999: Hung Hom Bay
Party	Candidate	Votes	%	±%
Democratic	Virginia Fung King-man	1,244	54.04	+3.81
DAB	Kwok Kam-ming	897	38.97	−8.80
Nonpartisan	Lai Ming-hung	161	7.00	
Majority		347	45.07	
Democratic hold		Swing		

Kowloon City District Board Election, 1994: Hung Hom Bay
Party	Candidate	Votes	%	±%
Democratic	Virginia Fung King-man	996	52.23	
LDF	Leung Keung	911	47.77	
Majority		85	4.46	
Democratic win (new seat)				
