= Serenade Cove =

Housing estate in Tsuen Wan, Hong Kong

Coordinates: 22.3725°N 114.1031°E

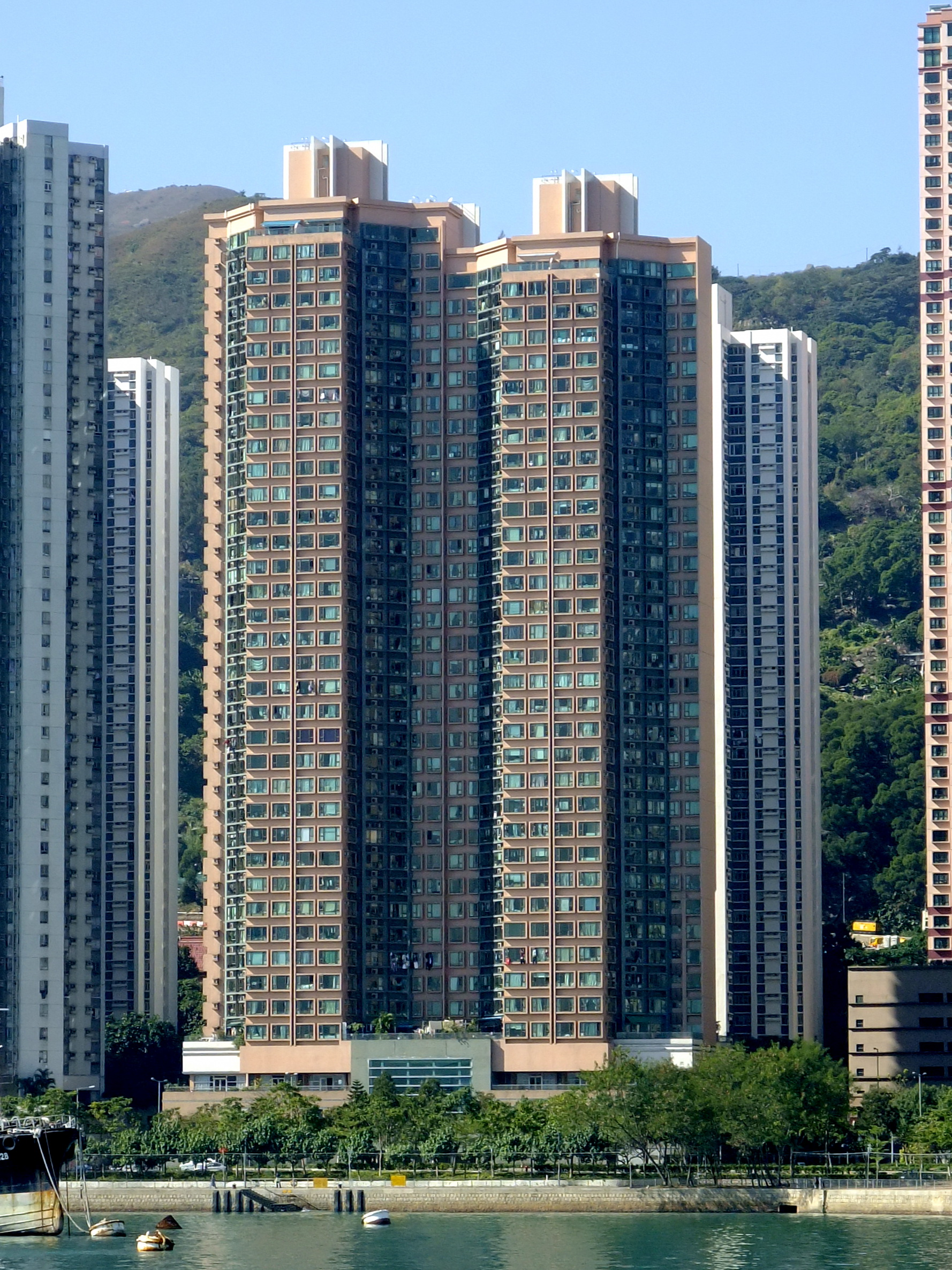
Serenade Cove

Serenade Cove (Chinese: 韻濤居) is a private housing estate in Tsuen Wan West, Tsuen Wan, New Territories, Hong Kong, near Belvedere Garden and Bayview Garden. It consists of 3 high-rise buildings developed by Wharf Holdings in 2001.

== Politics ==
Serenade Cove is located in Tsuen Wan West constituency of the Tsuen Wan District Council. It was formerly represented by Angus Yick Shing-chung, who was elected in the 2019 elections until July 2021.
