= Belvedere Garden =

Housing estate in Tsuen Wan, Hong Kong

Coordinates: 22.3719°N 114.1020°E

- Traditional Chinese: 麗城花園
- Simplified Chinese: 丽城花园
Transcriptions
Standard Mandarin
- Hanyu Pinyin: Lí Chéng Huāyuán
Yue: Cantonese
- Jyutping: lai6 sing4 faa1 jyun4*2

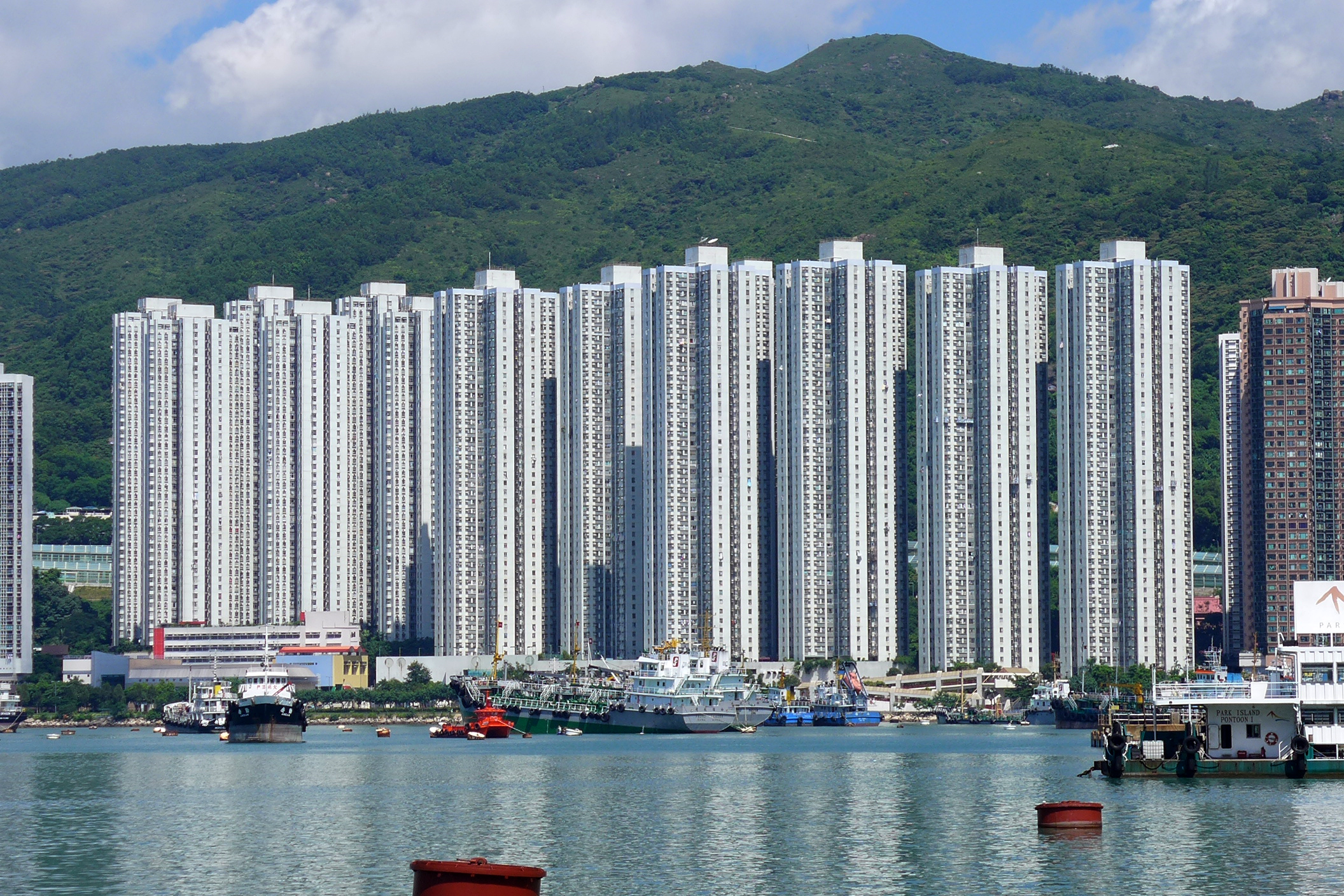
Belvedere Garden

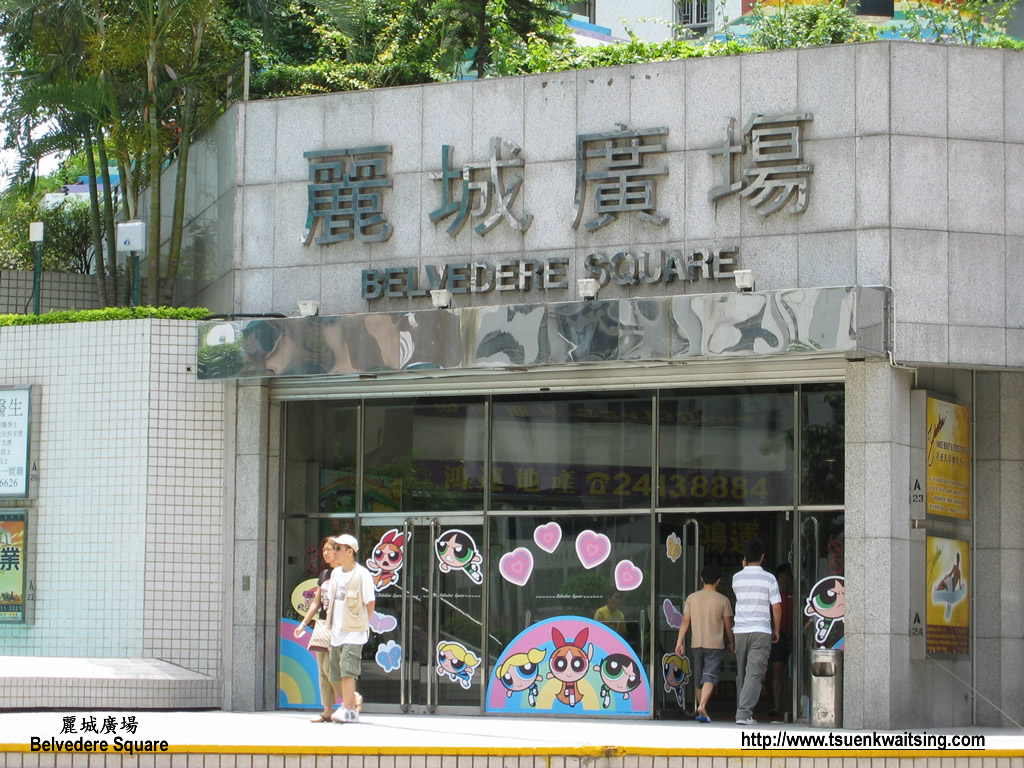
Belvedere Square

Belvedere Garden (Chinese: 麗城花園) is one of the largest-scale private housing estates in Tsuen Wan, New Territories, Hong Kong, located at the seaside of Tsuen Wan West.

Developed by Cheung Kong Holdings, it comprises 6,016 flats in 19 high rise residential towers developed in 3 phases. It was designed to be a self-contained community and was designed with a shopping arcade and a wet market.

== History ==
The estate was completed between 1987 and 1991.

In 2001, the Hang Seng Bank branch at the estate was robbed by Tsui Po-ko, a police officer.

== Demographics ==
According to the 2016 by-census, Belvedere Garden had a population of 18,745. The median age was 43.1 and the majority of residents (92.6 per cent) were of Chinese ethnicity. The average household size was 3.2 people. The median monthly household income of all households (i.e. including both economically active and inactive households) was HK$47,500.

== Politics ==
For the 2019 District Council election, the estate fell within two constituencies. Phase 1 and Phase 2 are located in the Lai To constituency, which was formerly represented by Ronald Tse Man-chak until July 2021, while Phase 3 falls within the Tsuen Wan West constituency, which was formerly represented by Angus Yick Shing-chung until July 2021.

== Education ==
Belvedere Garden is in Primary One Admission (POA) School Net 62, which includes schools in Tsuen Wan and areas nearby. The net includes multiple aided schools and one government school, Hoi Pa Street Government Primary School.

== Covid Pandemic ==
Block 4, Belvedere Garden Phase 2 was placed under lockdown on 19 April 2021 for mandatory testing.

== See also ==
- Serenade Cove
