= Pristine Villa =

Private housing estate in Hong Kong

Coordinates: 22.382341°N 114.181405°E

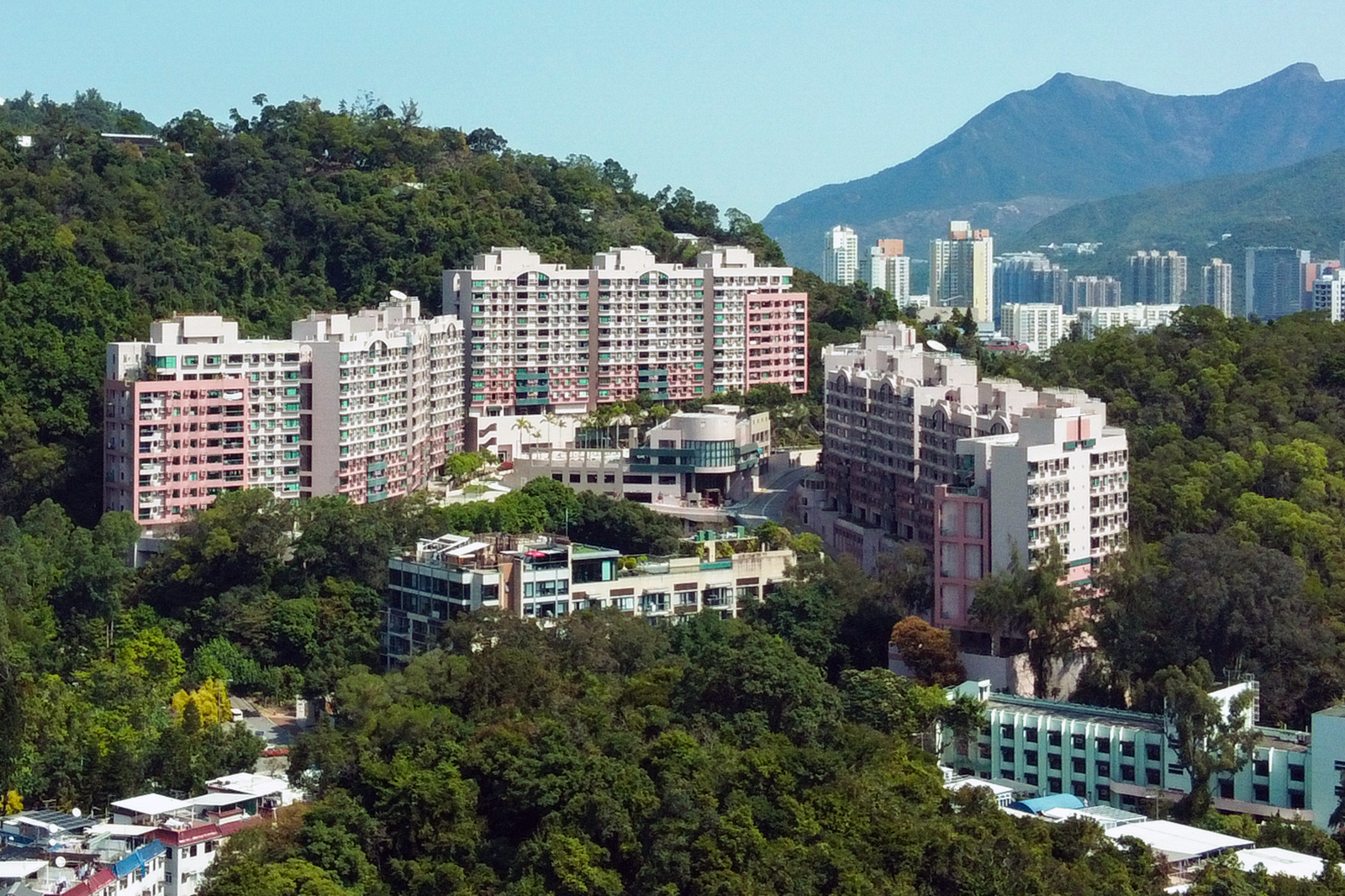
Pristine Villa in 2020.

Pristine Villa (Chinese: 曉翠山莊) is a private housing estate located on 18 Pak Lok Path in Tao Fong Shan, Sha Tin District, Hong Kong. It was developed by Sun Hung Kai Properties and was completed in 1995.

The housing estate consists of 14 tower blocks with heights from 9 to 11 floors and 4 apartments per floor, offering a total of 498 apartments. Facilities for residents include a resident clubhouse with a swimming pool, a car park with 747 parking spaces, and shuttle bus service to New Town Plaza.
