= Yoho Town =

Housing estate in Yuen Long, Hong Kong

Coordinates: 22.4422°N 114.0368°E

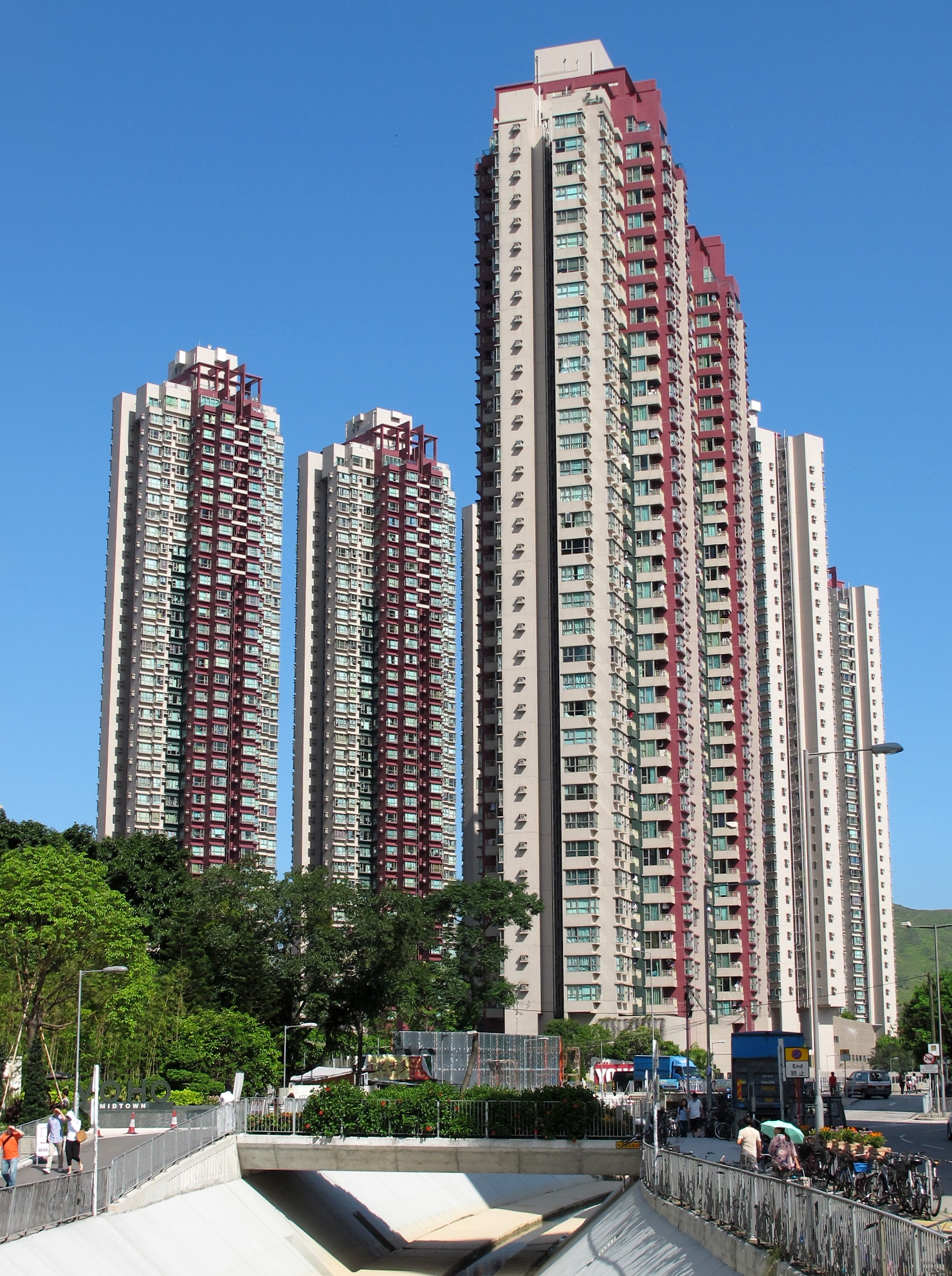
YOHO Town Phase I

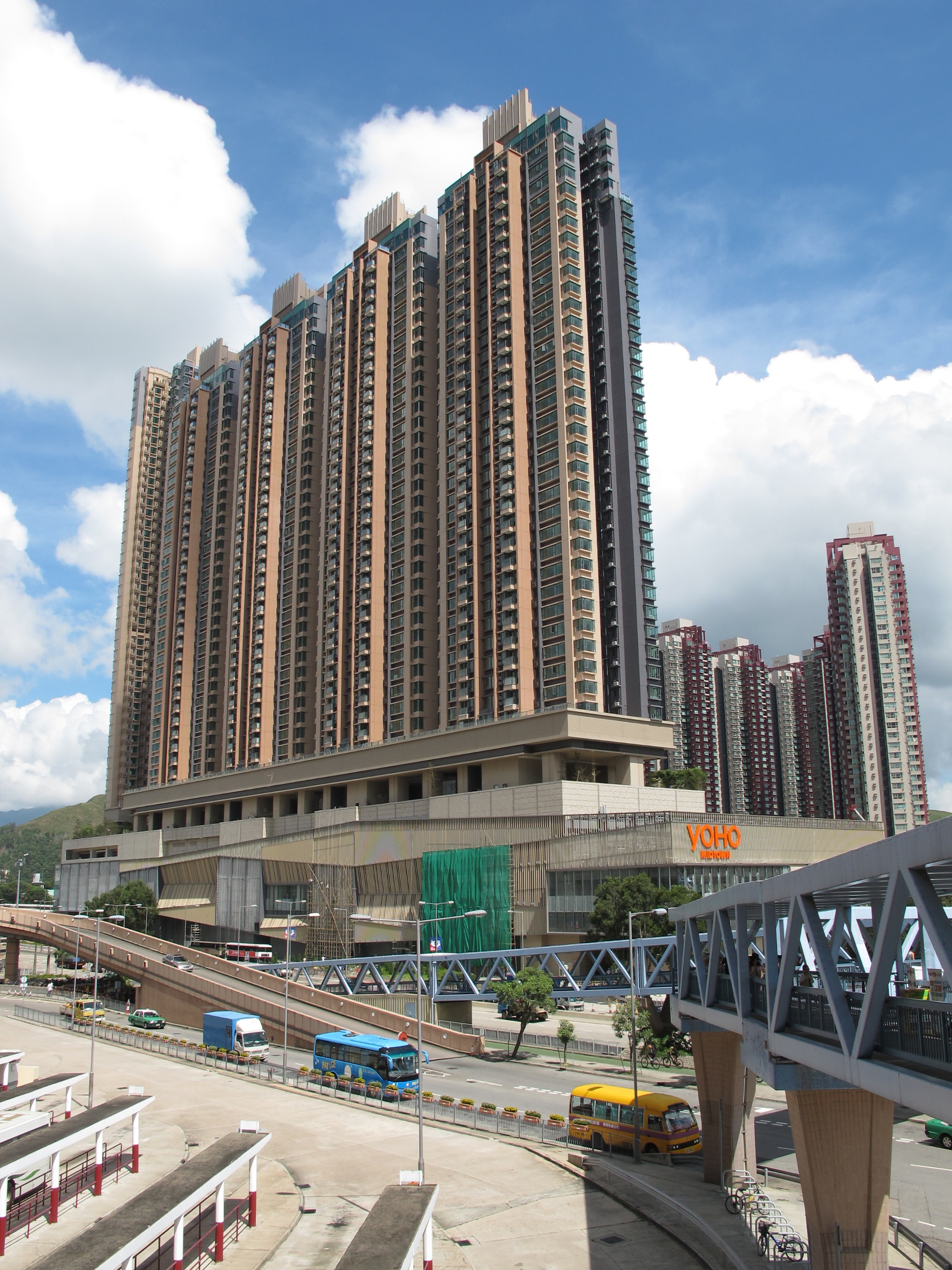
Yoho Midtown

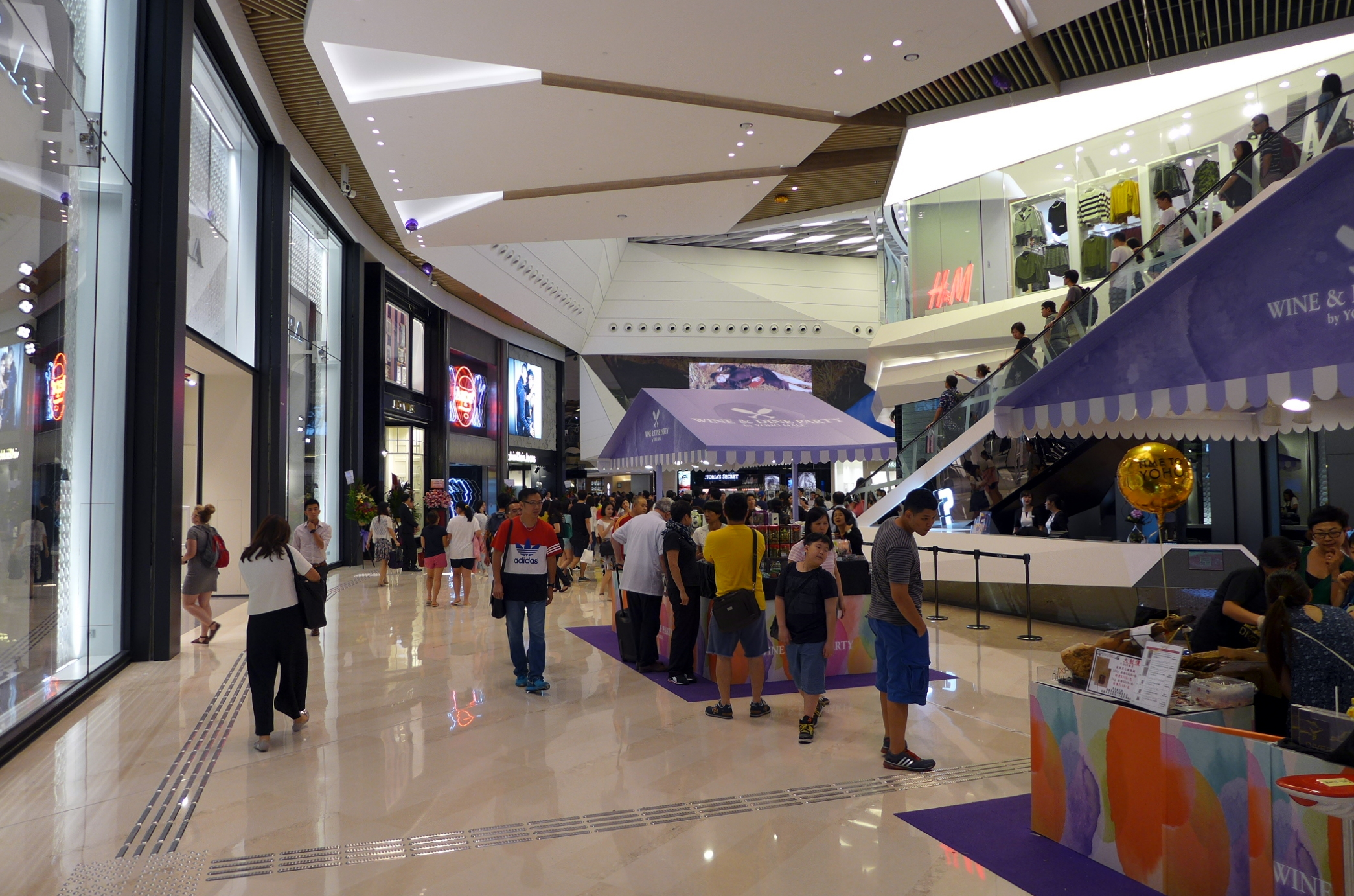
YOHO Mall Atrium

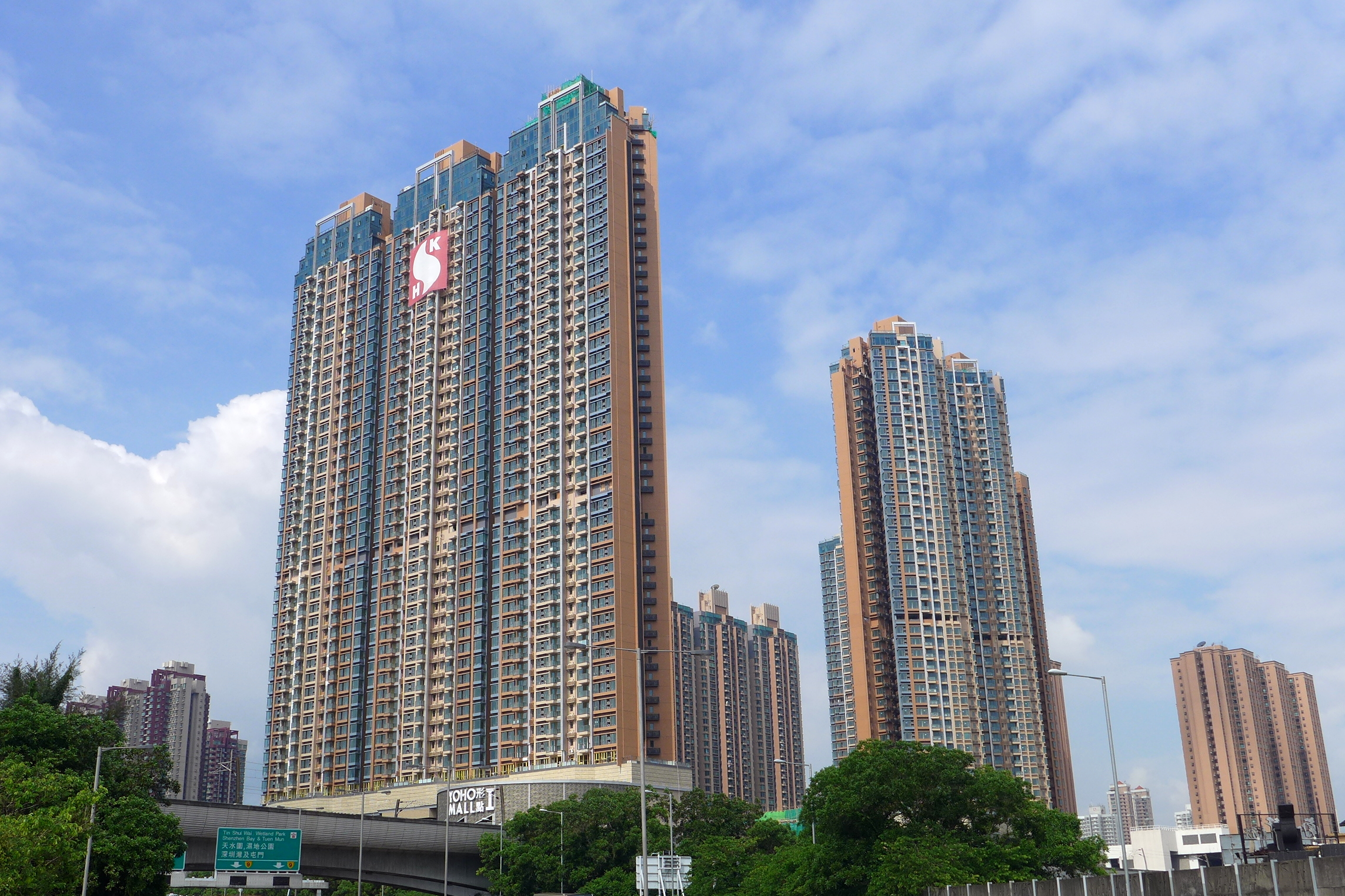
Grand YOHO

YOHO Town (Chinese: 新時代廣場) is one of the largest private housing estates and shopping centres in Yuen Long, New Territories, Hong Kong. It was developed by Sun Hung Kai Properties.

== Private housing ==
YOHO Town is divided into four phases.

Phase 1 "Yoho Town" has 2,200 residential units in eight blocks built in 2004.

Phase 2 "Yoho Midtown" was completed in 2010, and consists of eight residential buildings and a commercial shopping centre, YOHO Mall, opened in September 2015.

Phase 3 "Grand Yoho", was partially completed in June 2017 and consists of clubhouse and a commercial shopping centre YOHO Mall extension opened in July 2017. It is meant to have nine residential blocks, but only seven have been completed. Construction of one part of the development was suspended after the discovery of excessive settlement of two nearby viaduct columns supporting the adjacent Tuen Ma Line.

Phase 4 is still under construction.

== Shopping centre ==
YOHO Mall consists of three parts: YOHO mall 1, YOHO mall 2 and YOHO mall 1 extension. The total commercial area is about 1.1 million square feet.

== See also ==
- Gated community
