= Royal Peninsula =

Private housing estate in Hung Hom Bay, Hong Kong

- 半島豪庭
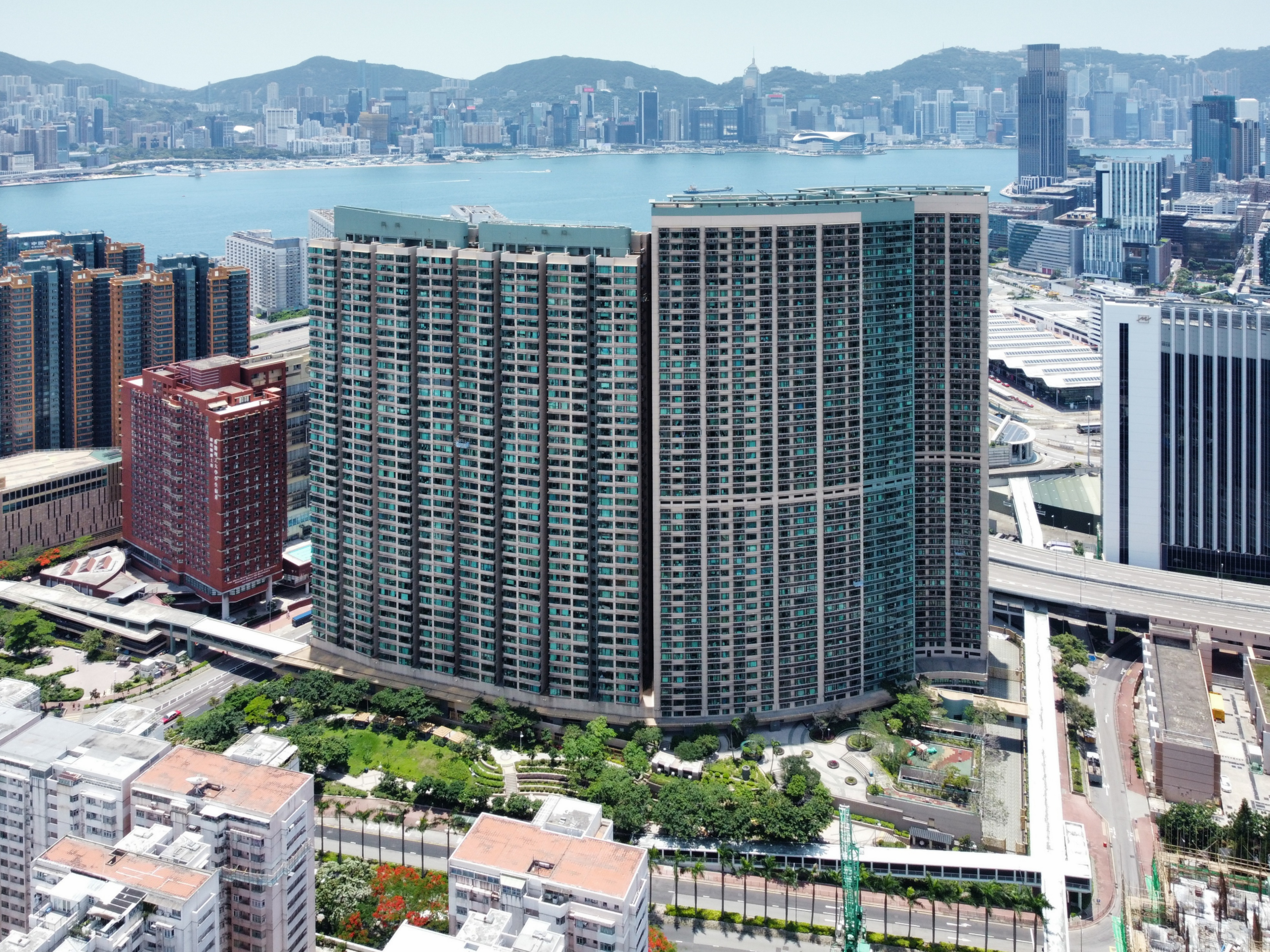
- Royal Peninsula in April 2024

General information
- Location: 8 Hung Lai Road, Hung Hom Bay, Hong Kong
- Coordinates: 22°18′17″N 114°11′02″E
- Completed: December 2000; 25 years ago

Height
- Top floor: 38-47

Technical details
- Floor count: 35-42

Design and construction
- Architect: Wong Tung & Partners
- Developer: Sun Hung Kai Properties and Henderson Land Development

Royal Peninsula
- Traditional Chinese: 半島豪庭
- Simplified Chinese: 半岛豪庭
Transcriptions
Standard Mandarin
- Hanyu Pinyin: Bàndǎo Háo Tíng
Yue: Cantonese
- Jyutping: bun3 dou2 hou4 ting4

Royal Peninsula (Chinese: 半島豪庭) is a private housing estate in Hung Hom, Kowloon Peninsula, Hong Kong, which was jointly developed by Sun Hung Kai Properties and Henderson Land Development in 2001. Built on the reclaimed land of Hung Hom Bay, it comprises 5 high-rise buildings with 1669 units.

== Penthouse ==
The high-rise penthouse apartments comprise 13 units, each with a floor area around 2,300 square feet. Located on the top floors (47-48) of Towers 2 and 3 and on floors (42-43) of Towers 4 and 5, these penthouse apartments are arranged in a south-facing arc, overlooking Victoria Harbour and the opposite shore from Causeway Bay to Central, providing a view of northern Hong Kong Island.

== Education ==
Royal Peninsula is in Primary One Admission (POA) School Net 35. Within the school net are multiple aided schools (operated independently but funded with government money) and Ma Tau Chung Government Primary School (Hung Hom Bay).

== Gallery ==
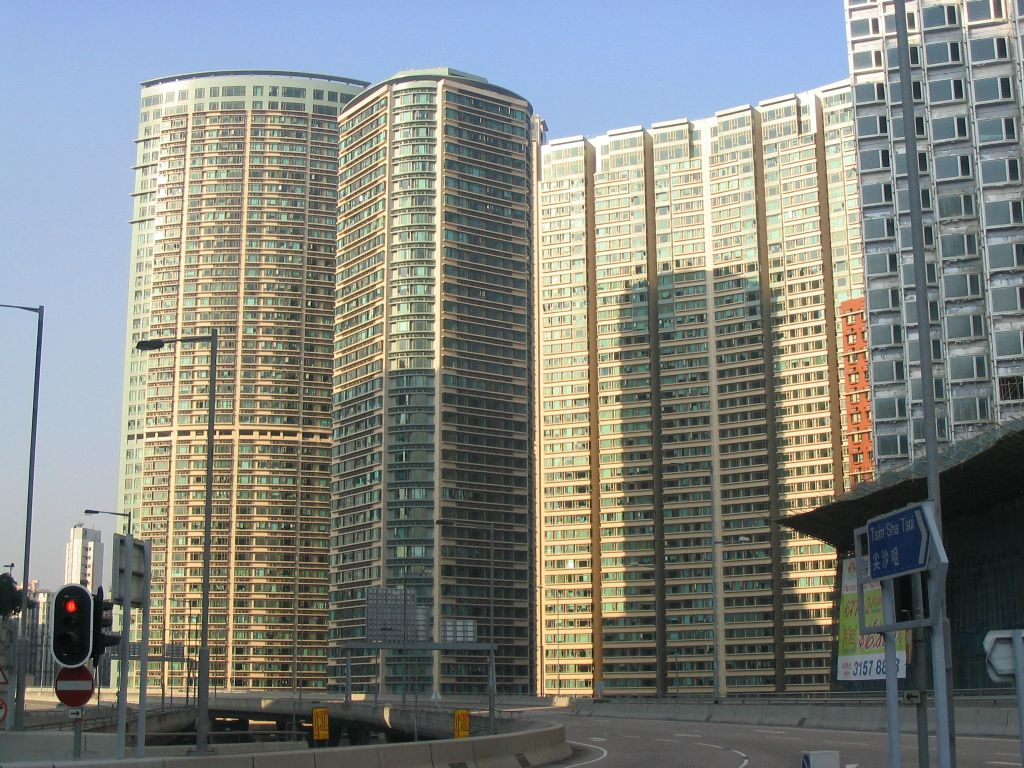
Royal Peninsula in November 2004

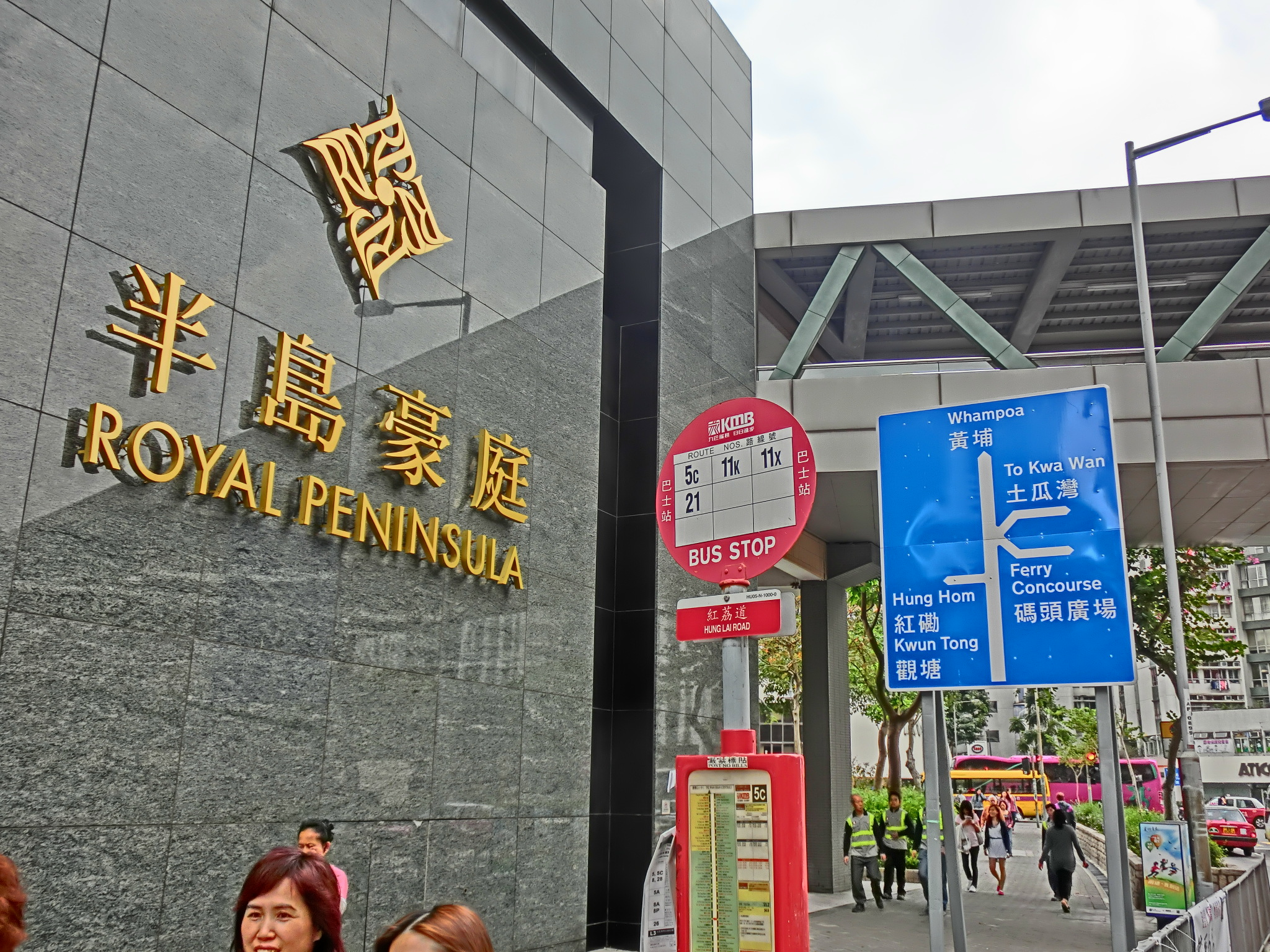
Building name sign of Royal Peninsula in March 2013

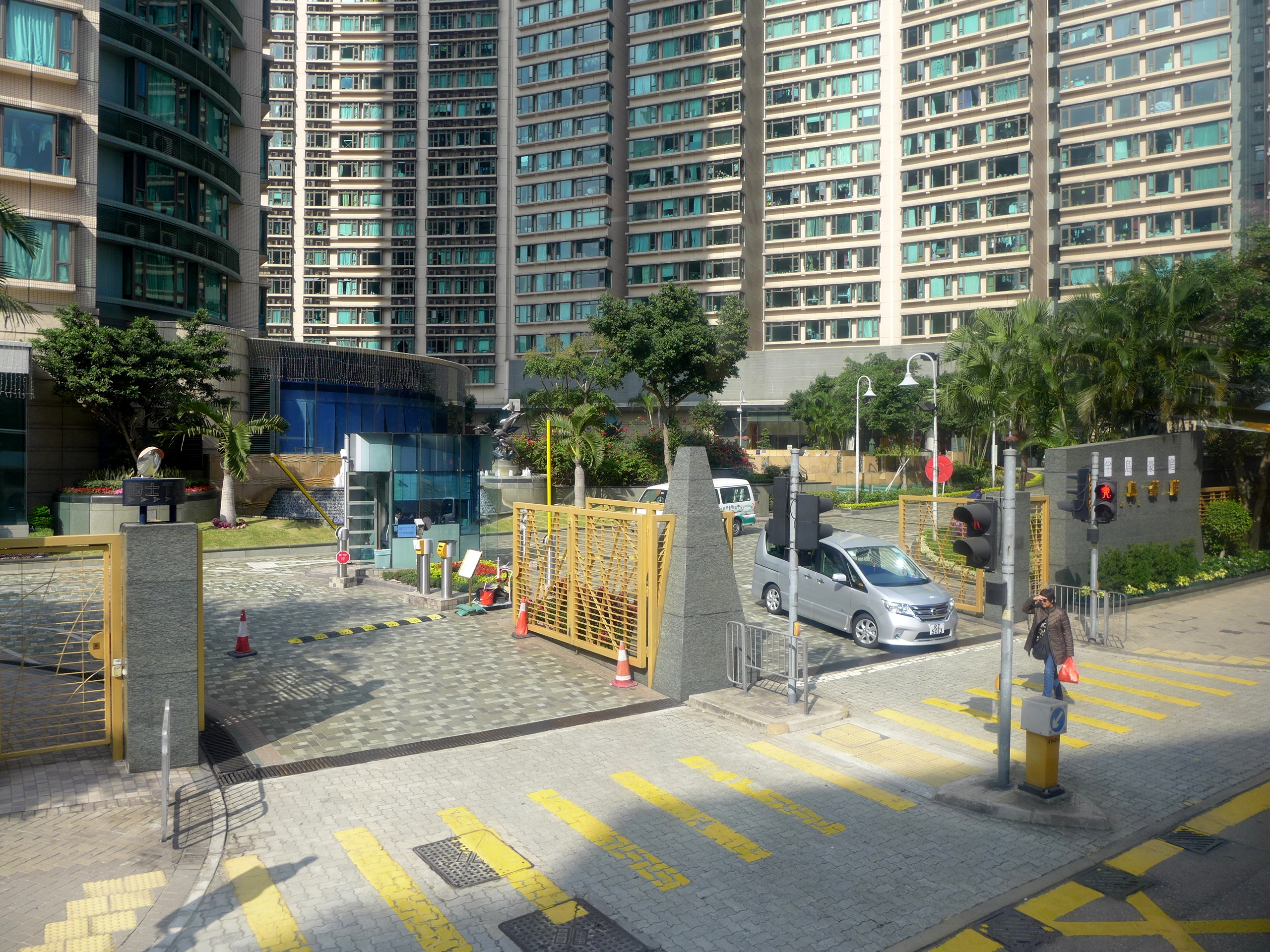
Royal Peninsula car entrance in January 2014

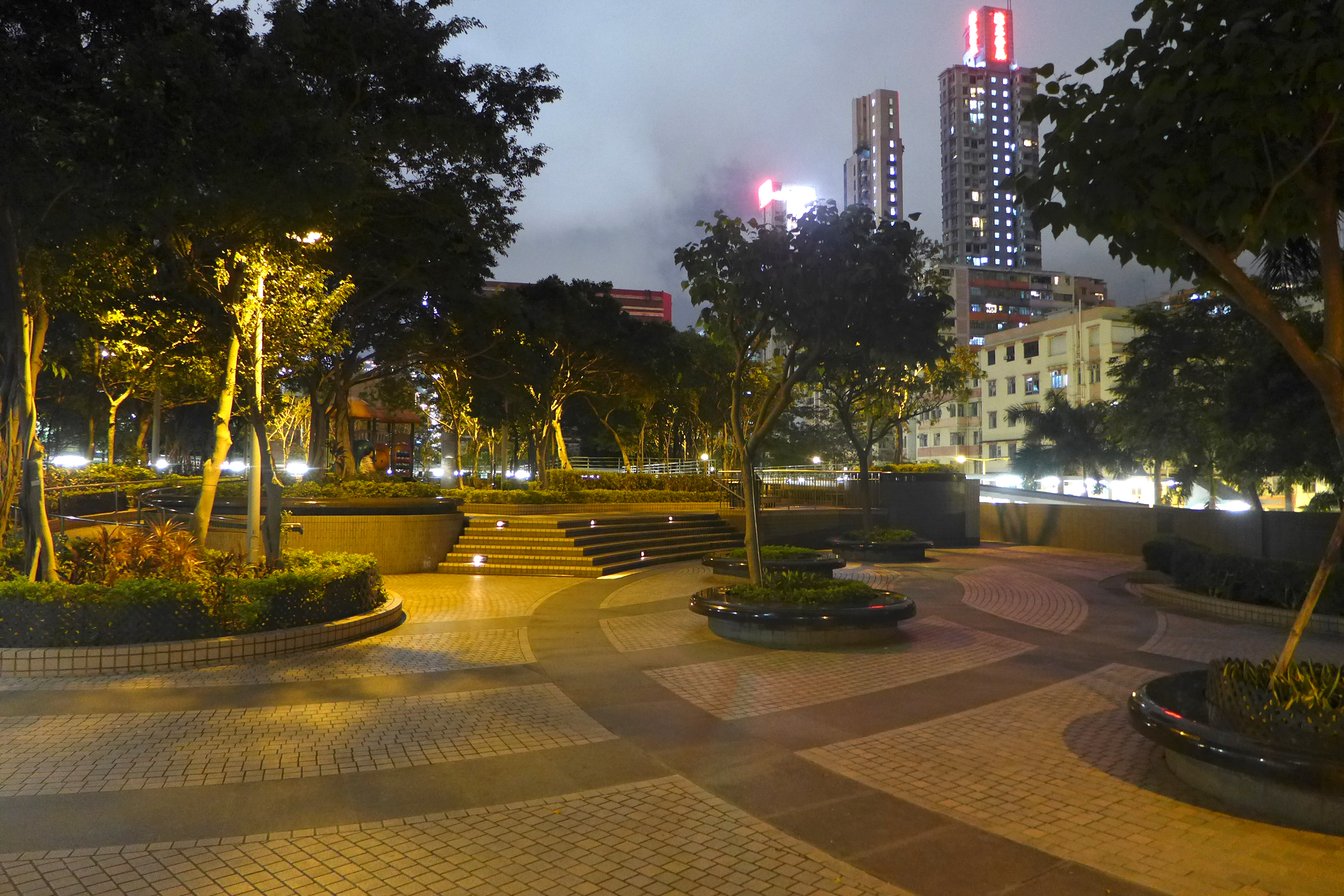
Public open space of Royal Peninsula in September 2016

== See also ==
- Hung Hom station
- Whampoa station
- Harbour Place
- The Harbourfront Landmark
