= Miami Beach Towers =

Housing estate in Tuen Mun, Hong Kong

Coordinates: 22.372055°N 113.96938°E

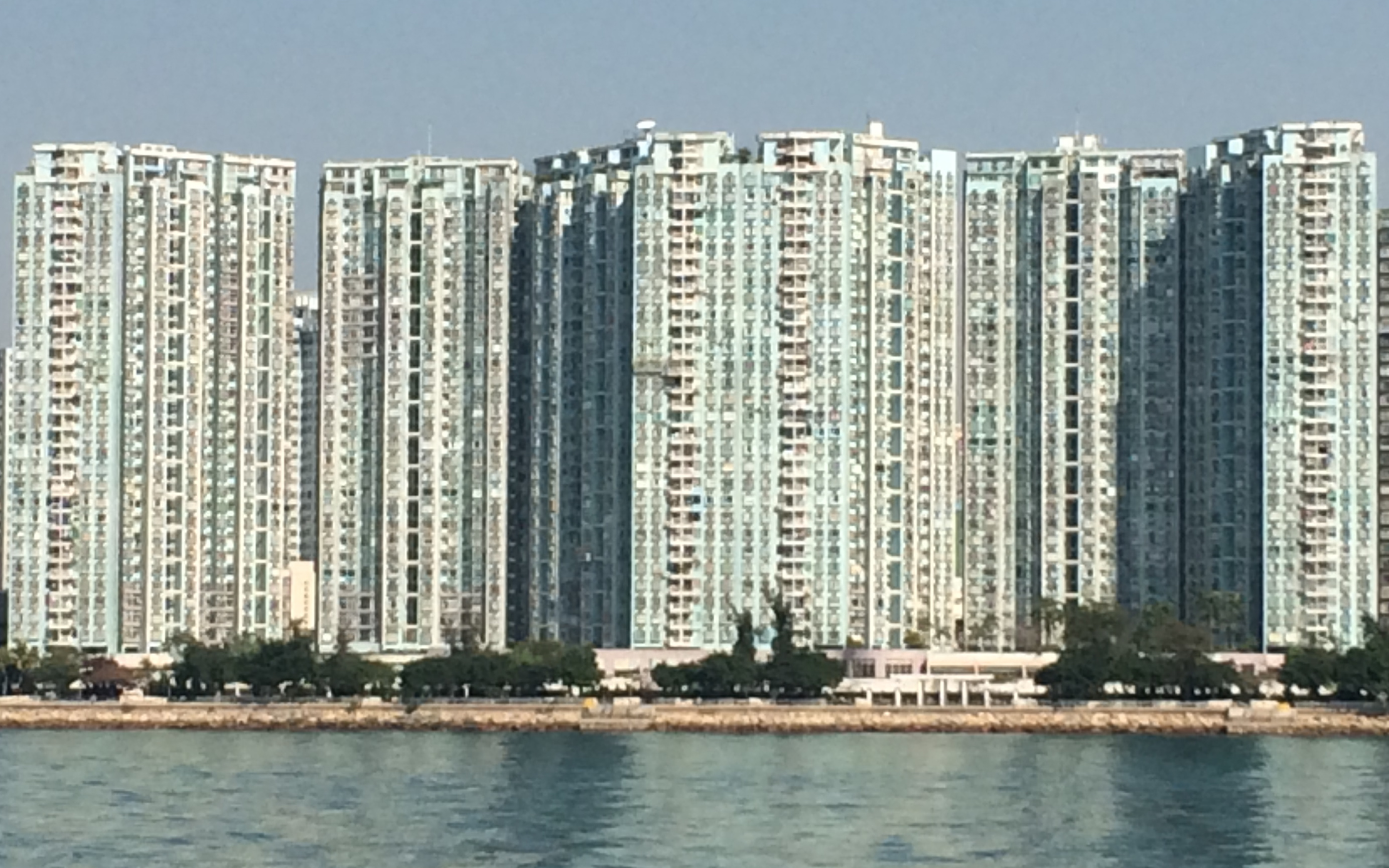
- Miami Beach Towers in January 2015
- Interactive map of Miami Beach Towers
- Location: Tuen Mun, New Territories, Hong Kong
- Address: 268 Wu Chui Road
- Status: Completed
- Constructed: 1991; 35 years ago

Companies
- Developer: Sino Land
- Manager: Sino Property Services

Technical details
- Buildings: 6 buildings in 2 phases

Miami Beach Towers
- Traditional Chinese: 邁亞美海灣
- Simplified Chinese: 迈亚美海湾
Transcriptions
Standard Mandarin
- Hanyu Pinyin: Màiyàměi Hǎiwān
Yue: Cantonese
- Jyutping: maai6 aa3 mei5 hoi2 waan1

Miami Beach Towers (Chinese: 邁亞美海灣) is a private housing estate located in Tuen Mun, New Territories, Hong Kong near Light Rail Tuen Mun Ferry Pier stop. It was built by Sino Land on land reclaimed from Castle Peak Bay.

== Features ==
The estate consists of 6 residential buildings built in two phases. Phase 1, incorporating Blocks 1, 2 and 3, was completed in 1991. Phase 2, incorporating Blocks 4, 5 and 6, was completed in 1992. The three buildings in each phase are arranged in the shape of a concave curve. There are 1,272 flats, ranging from 403 to 1,183 square feet (37.4 to 109.9 m^{2}), in the 6 residential towers.

In addition to the residential buildings, there four car parks and two clubhouses that provide a variety of leisure and recreational services. Facilities inside the estate include a 50m length swimming pool, squash courts, tennis and badminton courts, table tennis tables, a gymnasium, spa and saunas. The clubrooms also have a children's play area, snooker tables, a small library / homework area and meeting rooms. The car parking facilities on the estate are open to both residents and the general public.
