= Wong Tung & Partners =

Hong Kong architecture and design firm

- Industry: Architecture
- Founded: 1963
- Headquarters: Hong Kong, China; Additional offices in Beijing, Shanghai, Shenzhen and Chongqing
- Services: Architecture; Interior design; Urban design; Planning
- Number of employees: 400+
- Website: www.wongtung.com

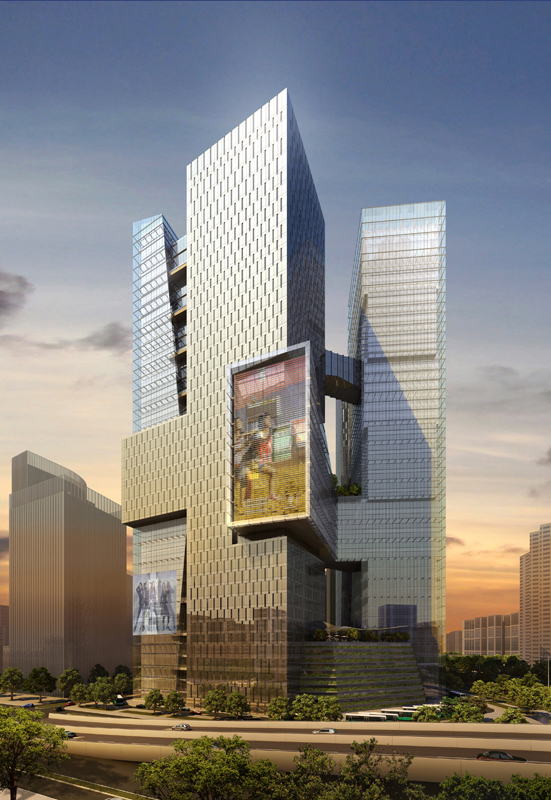
Tencent Headquarters

Wong Tung & Partners is an international architecture, planning and design firm established in Hong Kong in 1963. It has offices in Hong Kong, Beijing, Shanghai, Shenzhen and Chongqing.

Wong Tung & Partners provides multi-disciplinary services in architecture, interiors, planning and urban design. The firm has over 250 architectural professionals and personnel in Hong Kong and more than 150 staff in mainland China. Their projects include urban design and planning, large-scale mixed-use developments, super high-rises, large-scale residential developments, hotels, healthcare, retail centres, and hi-tech headquarters, throughout Southeast Asia, Middle East, North America and the People's Republic of China.

The firm also founded Zhong Tian Wong Tung International Engineering Design Consultants Co., Ltd., a joint-venture Grade A Design Institute in China.

In 2013, the firm ranked 54 on the WA100 (World Architecture 100) list of largest architectural practices in the world.

In June 2024, Wong Tung & Partners was among ten companies to receive the (Building and Construction Information) BCI Asia Top 10 Architects Award.

== Recent projects ==
- Kai Tak Cruise Terminal, Hong Kong, 2013 (in association with Foster + Partners)
- Tencent Headquarters, Shenzhen, China, 2011 (competition entry)
- Sino Portuguese Trade Center, Macau SAR, China, 2017 (competition entry)
- Changsha IFS Tower T1, Changsha, China
- Chongqing IFS, Chongqing, China
- Trade & Industry Tower, Kai Tak, Hong Kong
- Victoria Skye, Kai Tak, Hong Kong

== Major projects ==
- MegaBox, Hong Kong
- MGM Macau, Macau, 2010
- Dragon Centre, Sham Shui Po, Hong Kong, China
- The China World Trade Center, Beijing, China
- One Central Macau, Macau
- St. Francis Towers
- Hillsborough Court, Hong Kong
- Hong Kong Parkview, Hong Kong
- K. City, Kai Tak, Hong Kong
- Mei Foo Sun Chuen, Kowloon, Hong Kong
- Taikoo Shing, Hong Kong
- Fleur Pavilia, Hong Kong
