= Tsuen Wan West (constituency) =

Constituency of the Tsuen Wan District Council of Hong Kong

- Elected constituency for the Tsuen Wan District Council
- Boundary of Tsuen Wan West in Tsuen Wan District
- District: Tsuen Wan
- Legislative Council constituency: New Territories South West
- Population: 16,058 (2019)
- Electorate: 9,542 (2019)

Current constituency
- Created: 1982 (first time); 1994 (second time)
- Number of members: One
- Member: Angus Yick Shing-chung (Democratic)

Tsuen Wan West (Chinese: 荃灣西), formerly Lai Hing from 1994 to 2015, is one of the 19 constituencies in the Tsuen Wan District of Hong Kong.

The constituency loosely covers The Dynasty and part of the Belvedere Garden and Bayview Garden in Tsuen Wan with the estimated population of 16,058.

== Councillors represented ==
Election	Member	Party
1982	Chan Koon-shing	Independent
1985	Constituency abolished	
1994	Cheng Wing-kee	Independent
1999	Albert Chan Wai-yip	Democratic
2000	Albert Chan Wai-yip	Independent
2006	Albert Chan Wai-yip	LSD
2011	Albert Chan Wai-yip	People Power
2011	Nixie Lam Lam	DAB
2019	Angus Yick Shing-chung	Democratic

== Election results ==
=== 2010s ===
Tsuen Wan District Council Election, 2019: Tsuen Wan West
Party	Candidate	Votes	%	±%
Democratic	Angus Yick Shing-chung	4,718	61.85	−10.05
DAB	Nixie Lam Lam	2,910	38.15	
Majority		1,808	23.70	
Turnout		7,657	80.27	
Democratic gain from DAB		Swing		

Tsuen Wan District Council Election, 2015: Tsuen Wan West
Party	Candidate	Votes	%	±%
DAB	Nixie Lam Lam	2,462	51.8	
TWDP	Poon Chiu-lam	1,500	31.5	
Nonpartisan	Chu Shun-ming	793	16.7	
Majority		962	20.3	
Turnout		4,843	53.7	
DAB hold		Swing		

Tsuen Wan District Council Election, 2011: Lai Hing
Party	Candidate	Votes	%	±%
DAB	Nixie Lam Lam	1,965	51.0	
People Power	Jacqueline Chan So-ling	1,045	27.1	
Liberal	Au Ming-sze	845	21.9	
DAB gain from People Power		Swing		

=== 2000s ===
Tsuen Wan District Council Election, 2007: Lai Hing
Party	Candidate	Votes	%	±%
LSD	Albert Chan Wai-yip	1,739	66.0	
DAB	Yau Tsang-keung	894	34.0	
LSD hold		Swing		

Tsuen Wan District Council Election, 2003: Lai Hing
Party	Candidate	Votes	%	±%
Independent	Albert Chan Wai-yip	1,860	65.2	
Independent	Koo Yeung-pong	541	19.0	
HKPA	Lo Bing-sang	452	15.8	
Independent hold		Swing		

=== 1990s ===
Tsuen Wan District Council Election, 1999: Lai Hing
Party	Candidate	Votes	%	±%
Democratic	Albert Chan Wai-yip	1,399	63.4	
Independent	Mak Yat-chiu	797	36.1	
Independent	Ho Tak-kwong	125	7.4	
Democratic gain from Independent		Swing		

Tsuen Wan District Board Election, 1994: Lai Hing
Party	Candidate	Votes	%	±%
Independent	Cheng Wing-kee	1,599	70.3	
UFSP	Yeung Fuk-ki	664	29.2	
Independent win (new seat)				

=== 1980s ===
Tsuen Wan District Board Election, 1982: Tsuen Wan West
Party	Candidate	Votes	%	±%
Independent	Chan Koon-shing	2,201	61.81	
Independent	Cheung Chung-yan	716	20.11	
Independent	Chu Tsz-kwan	330	9.27	
Independent	Chan Koon-shing	314	8.82	
Independent win (new seat)				
