= Tsuen Wan West =

City in Hong Kong

Coordinates: 22.37°N 114.11°E

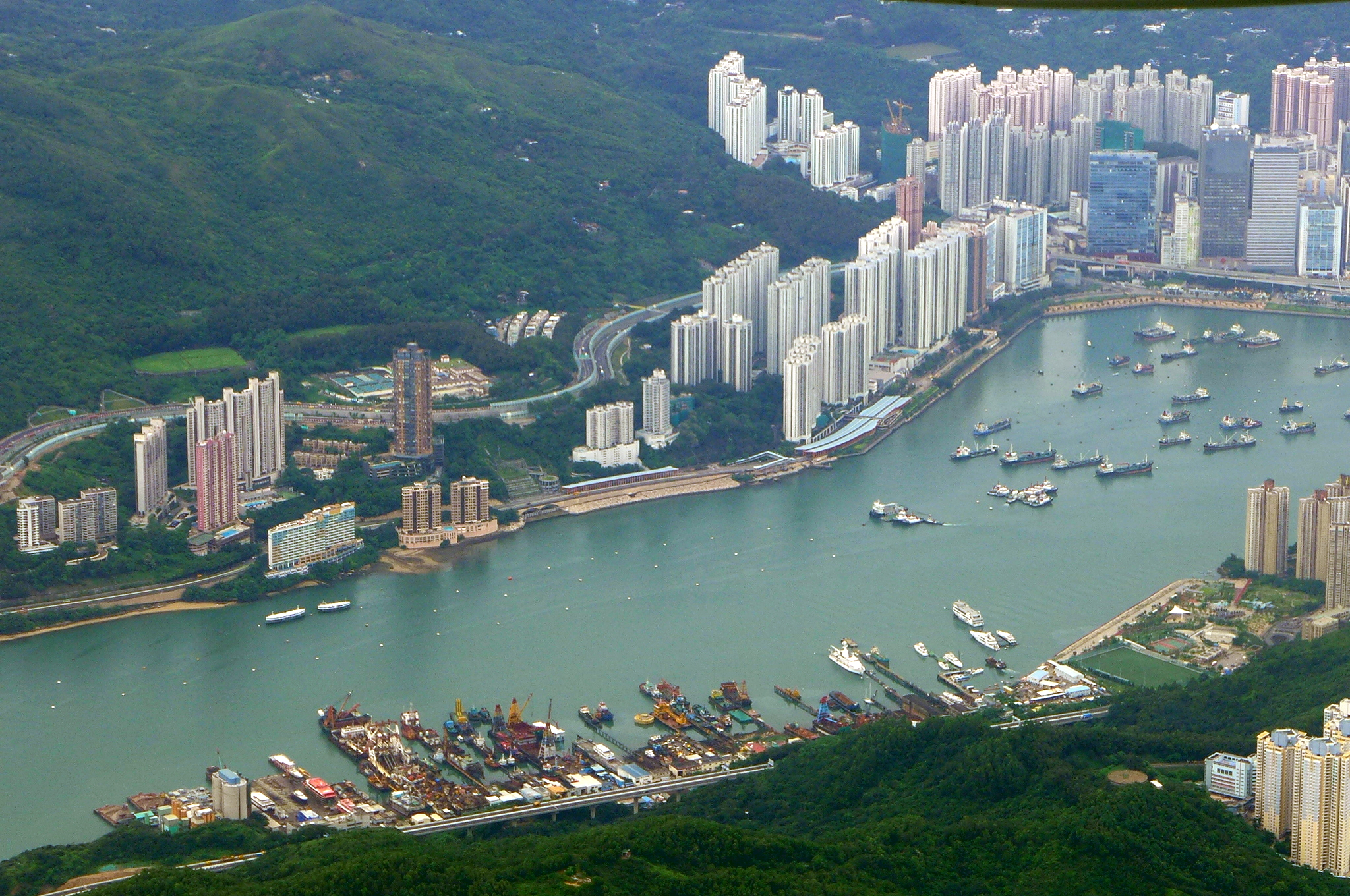
- The day scene of Tsuen Wan West (2014), with Tsuen King Circuit in the background in the top right corner.
- Traditional Chinese: 荃灣西約
Transcriptions
Hakka
- Romanization: Cien2 Van1 Si1 Joek3
Yue: Cantonese
- Jyutping: Cyun4 Wan1 Sai1 Yue4

Tsuen Wan West (Chinese: 荃灣西約) is situated at the west of Tsuen Wan, New Territories, Hong Kong, along Castle Peak Road between Yau Kom Tau and Chai Wan Kok. There are mainly private residential estates, including Belvedere Garden, Bayview Garden, Greenview Court, the Panorama and Serenade Cove. The largest one is Belvedere Gardens.

Previously, a bus terminus called "Tsuen Wan West Bus Terminus" was located in Tsuen Wan West, but it was later relocated to Bayview Garden after the construction of Bayview Garden was completed. Now there is still one sports centre named as "Tsuen Wan West" and called "Tsuen Wan West Sports Centre".

== See also ==
- Castle Peak Road
- Chai Wan Kok
- Tsuen King Circuit
