= Hong Kong Parkview =

Housing estate in Tai Tam, Hong Kong

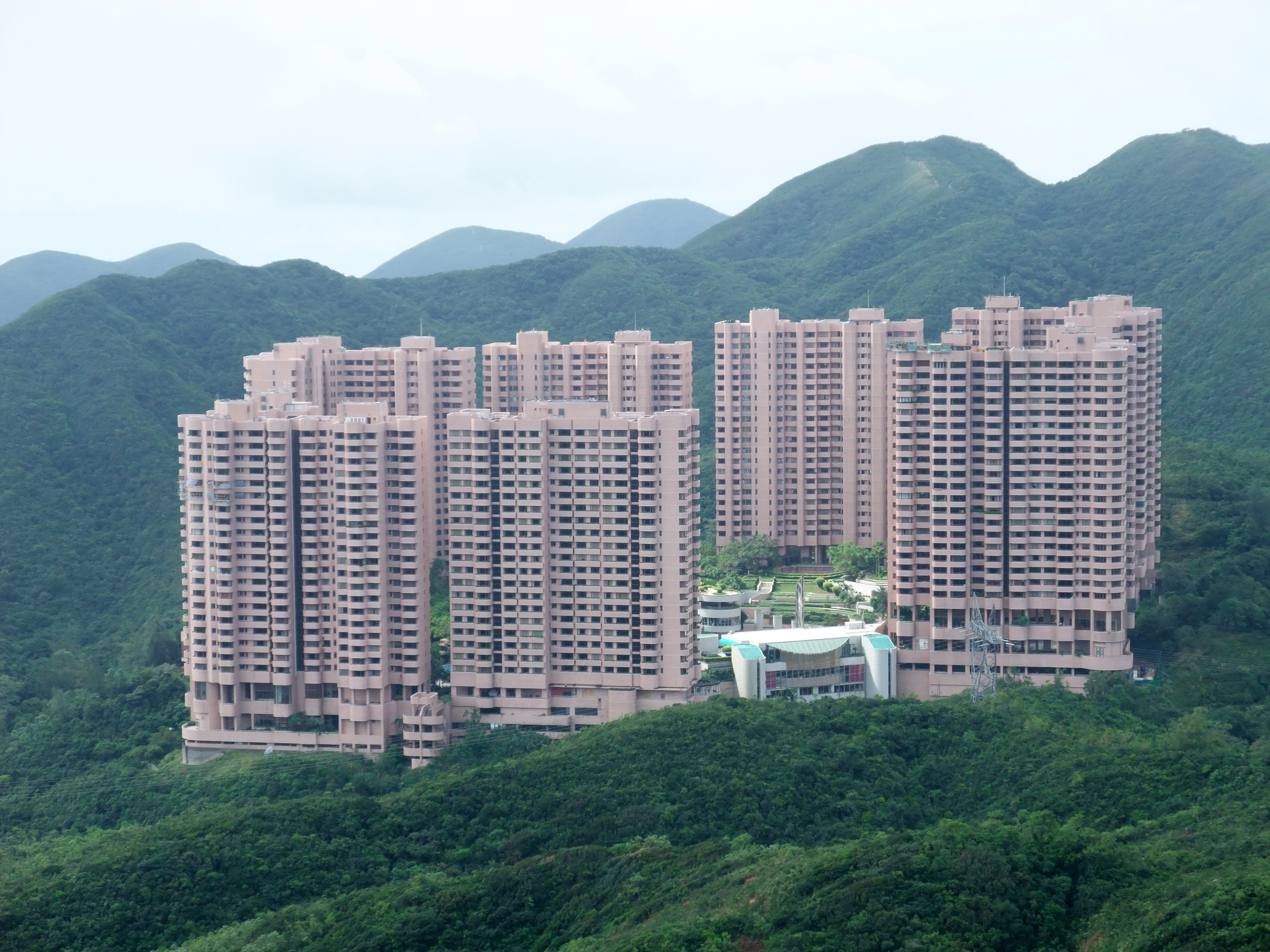
- Interactive map of the Hong Kong Parkview area

General information
- Status: Completed
- Type: Residential apartments
- Location: 88 Tai Tam Reservoir Road, Tai Tam, Hong Kong
- Coordinates: 22.2575°N 114.1996°E
- Construction started: 1981; 45 years ago
- Completed: 1989; 37 years ago

Technical details
- Floor count: 18 towers; 20 floors per tower

Design and construction
- Architect: Wong Tung & Partners
- Developer: Chyau Fwu Group (now Parkview Group)

Other information
- Number of units: 984

Hong Kong Parkview
- Traditional Chinese: 陽明山莊
- Simplified Chinese: 阳明山庄
Transcriptions
Standard Mandarin
- Hanyu Pinyin: Yángmíng Shān Zhuāng
Yue: Cantonese
- Yale Romanization: Yèuhng mìhng sāan jōng
- Jyutping: Joeng4 ming4 saan1 zong1

Hong Kong Parkview is the largest private housing estate in Tai Tam, Hong Kong. It is located at 88 Tai Tam Reservoir Road, Hong Kong Island, between Jardine's Lookout and Violet Hill. To its west is the Wong Nai Chung Gap. It is surrounded by Tai Tam Country Park.

== Description ==
Comprising 18 high-end residential buildings, this complex features a ground level sitting nearly 300 meters above sea level, making its structures some of the highest in Hong Kong. The project was designed by Wang Dong Architects Co., Ltd. and constructed by Hip Hing Construction Co., Ltd. from August 1988 to May 1989.

Each block is 20 stories tall. The estate comprises a total of 984 flats.

== History ==
It consists of 18 blocks opened in 1989 by Chyau Fwu and designed by Wong Tung & Partners. It is managed by the Parkview Group today.

Being surrounded by protected lands on all sides, the development was criticised after opening for spoiling the serenity of Tai Tam Country Park.

In 2004, undercover officers from the Home Affairs Department stayed overnight at Hong Kong Parkview, and found that it offered services akin to that of a hotel. Parkview (Suites) Limited and Tri-view Limited were thus fined HK$20,000 for operating a hotel without a licence, as is required under the Hotel and Guesthouse Accommodation Ordinance. Parkview appealed the fines, arguing that they operated within a technical loophole, but the appeal was rejected by the Court of Final Appeal in 2006.

== Education ==
Parkview is in Primary One Admission (POA) School Net 18. Within the school net are multiple aided schools (operated independently but funded with government money) and Hong Kong Southern District Government Primary School (香港南區官立小學).

== Murder incident ==
On 2 November 2003, Robert Kissel, the Asia-Pacific managing director of global principal products of Merrill Lynch, was bludgeoned to death by his wife, Nancy Kissel, after having their young daughter bring him a milkshake laced with sleep medicine.

== Gallery ==
Map of Hong Kong Parkview

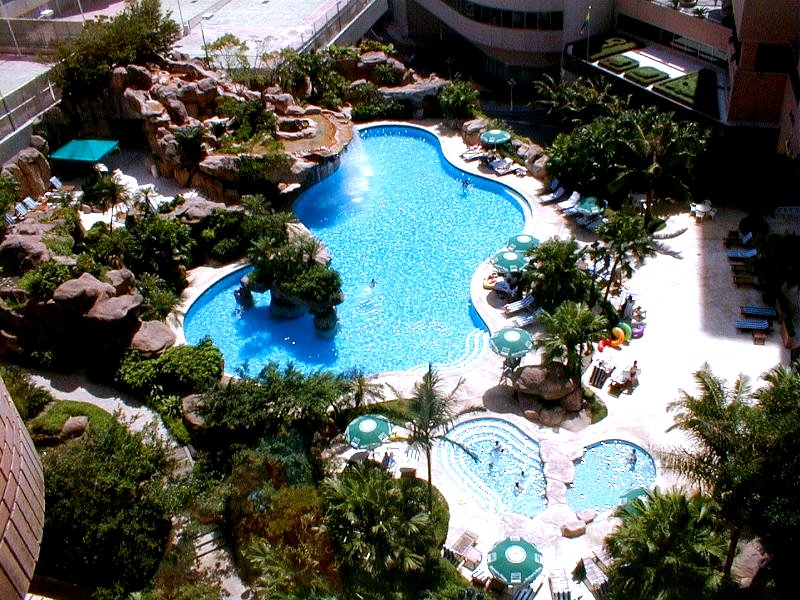
Swimming pool in Hong Kong Parkview

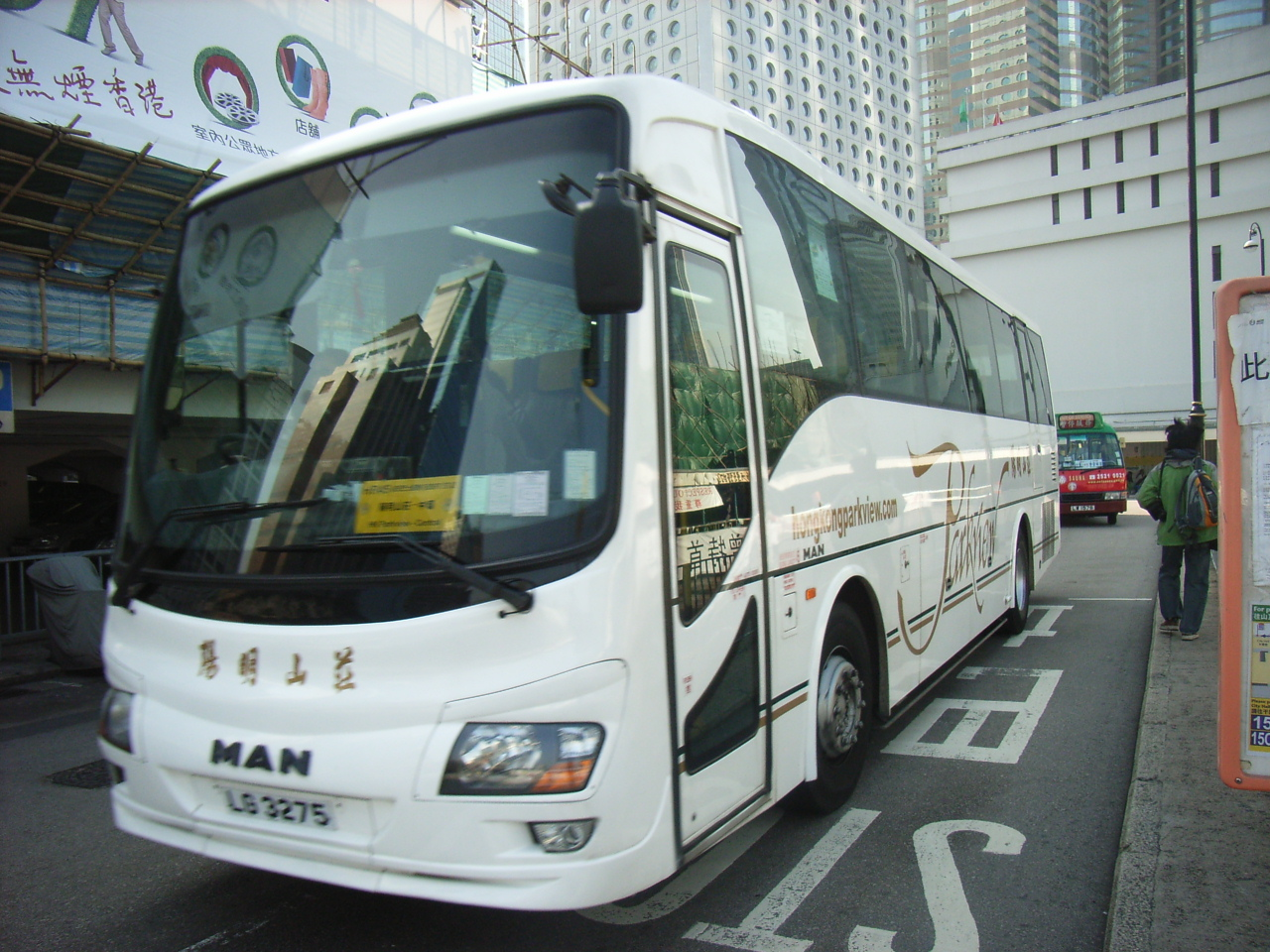
Shuttle bus in Hong Kong Parkview
