= Joy City Property =

Hong Kong land development company

Formerly
Ming Ren Investment & Enterprises	(1973–1992)
Ming Ren Holding	(1992–93)
The Hong Kong Parkview Group	(1993–2013)
COFCO Land Holdings	(2013–2015)
- Company type: Public company
- Traded as: SEHK: 207
- Genre: Property Development
- Founded: 28 October 1992
- Founder: Hwang Chou-Shiuan
- Headquarters: Hong Kong (de facto); Bermuda (incorporated)
- Key people: Zhou Zheng (Chairman)
- Operating income: HK$ 41,774,880 (2010–11)
- Net income: HK$ 31,566,290 (2010–11) (Note: Partially due to extraordinary profit)
- Total assets: HK$ 366,102,675 (2010–11)
- Total equity: HK$ 164,345,359 (2010–11)
- Parent: COFCO
- Website: joy-cityproperty.com

Joy City Property
- Traditional Chinese: 大悅城地產有限公司
- Simplified Chinese: 大悦城地产有限公司
Transcriptions
Standard Mandarin
- Hanyu Pinyin: Dàyuè Chéng Dìchǎn Yǒuxiàngōngsī
Yue: Cantonese
- Jyutping: daai6 jyut6 sing4 dei6 caan2 jau5 haan6 gung1 si1

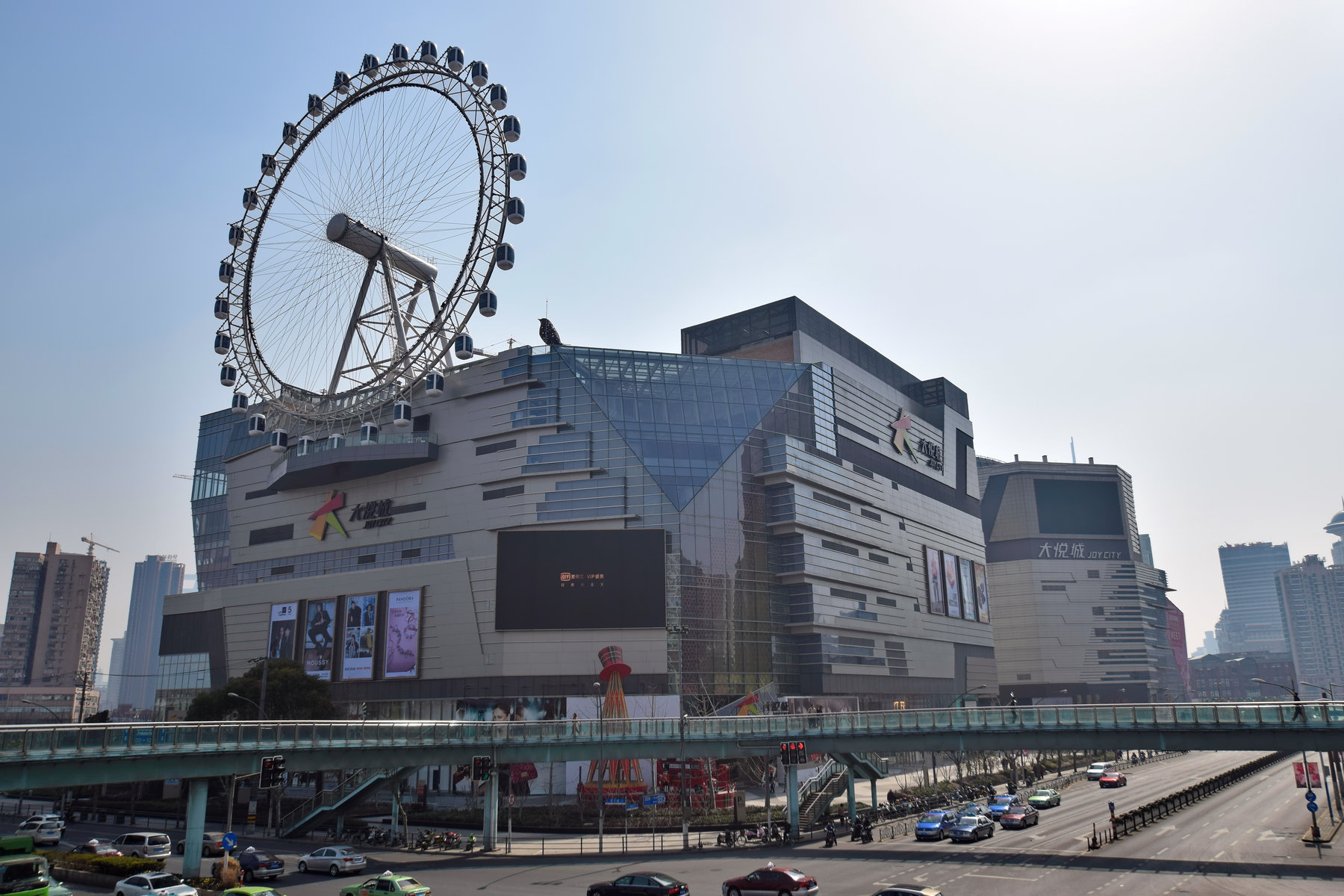
Joy City building

Joy City Property Limited (Chinese: 大悅城地產有限公司), is a listed company of Hong Kong, but incorporated in Bermuda. The company was formerly known as The Hong Kong Parkview Group Ltd..

Its head office is on the 33rd floor of the COFCO Tower (中糧大廈) in Causeway Bay.

== History ==
The legal person of the listed company had a few different names, partially due to two reverse IPO.

=== The Hong Kong Parkview Group ===
Wong family and its company Chyau Fwu was the developer of Hong Kong Parkview, one of the largest residential project in the southern Hong Kong Island, the Chinese name of the real estate has a similar name with Yangmingshan, which the family business originated from that country. Wong family injected the family asset on Hong Kong Parkview, to the group by issuing new shares, made Wong family owned more than 80% interest in the group. The listed company was engaged in the charter hire of vessels until Wong family (through Chyau Fwu Development Ltd.) acquired the majority shares in 1990, from Sze Ka-Shuen (Mr. Sze) to complete a backdoor listing.

The group also had numbers of properties in Hong Kong, namely 13 blocks out of 16 of Manchester Lodge, 11/F of World-Wide House (re-acquired in 2010), the freehold of Battersea Power Station, and nearly 80,000 sq.ft. of residential flat of Hong Kong Parkview, a unit in the G/F of Admiralty Centre, which were sold back to Wong family in 2001 for HK$833,392,140 Special dividend was received by shareholders, which in turn Wong family received most, made the equity of the group fell from HK$1,277,549,366 to HK$217,339,024.

The Group had a hotel project in Dingshan, Nanjing, Eastern China (Newmeadow Limited, owned 45% interests of Nanjing Dingshan Garden Hotel Co., Ltd.). In 2010, along with some properties in Shanghai (as "Gallaria Furnishing Int. Ltd.) and other assets, they were sold to parent company Kompass for HK$140,610,334. In exchange, 11/F of World-Wide House was bought again by the listed company from George Wong and his family for HK$289,516,400.

== Ownership ==
The holding company/majority shareholder of the group is "Kompass International Limited", which all four executive directors of the group, George Wong, Victor Hwang, Richard Hwang and Tony Hwang were the shareholders. (Wong/Hwang both were the romanization of Chinese surname (Chinese: 黃)) Moreover, the second largest shareholder, High Return Trading Limited, is owned by George Wong. Lastly, Huang Jian-quan (Huang is another romanization of the Chinese surname (Chinese: 黃, literally "Yellow")), owned 7.47% shares as of 31 March 2011, who has no known relation with the Wong family. "Multi-Power International Limited" also owned 7.47% shares, made less than 15% shares were held by the public.

== Sister companies ==
=== Battersea Power Station ===
Hwang family also had asset around the world, such as Battersea Power Station but sold in 2006. Despite in 1996–97 annual report the listed company announced that it acquired the rights to develop a 5-star hotel, some reports also stated that the land lease was owned by Hwang family via "Parkview International (London)" but not under the listed company, which Hwang family only leased back the development rights to the company. In 2000–01 annual report, the listed company also announced that it formed a conditional sales and purchase agreement with Limbhill Properties Limited and Parkview Int. London PLC (both held by Hwang family), to buy the land from Hwang family for £6 million (approx. HK$66,768,000). Eventually the special general meeting approved the transaction. In 2001, Hwang brothers, through Outshine Holdings Limited, bought numbers of properties from the group for HK$833,392,140, including the power station valued £7 million (approx. HK$77,300,000), (Note: Listed as "Freehold land on the eastern side of Kirtling Street at the corner of Cringle Street London SW8")

== Subsidiaries ==
As of 31 March 2011

- Hong Kong Parkview (China) Limited
- Hong Kong Parkview International Management Limited
- Parkview Management Services Limited
- Parkview Property Development Limited
- Chyau Fwu Investment Limited (Note: Chyau Fwu is the romanization of the Chinese name of the group (Chinese: 僑福), which the company holds 11/F of World-Wide House as asset)
