= Kam Tsin Wai =

Village in Hong Kong

Kam Tsin Wai Chinese: 金錢圍
- Village
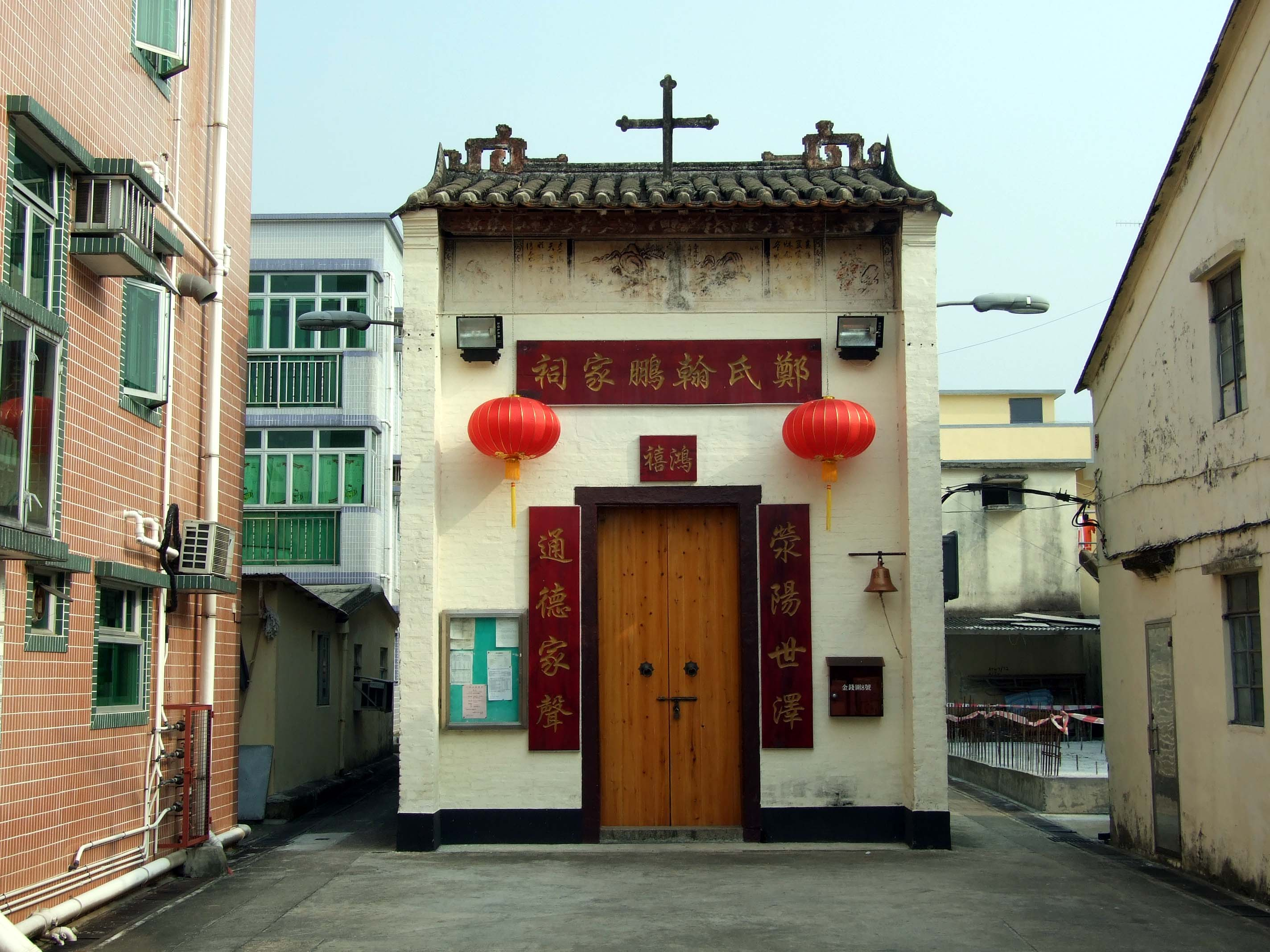
- Cheng Hon Pang Ancestral Hall in Kam Tsin Wai

- Location within Hong Kong
- Coordinates: 22.433071°N 114.074593°E
- Country: People's Republic of China
- Special administrative region: Hong Kong
- District: Yuen Long District
- Area: Pat Heung
- Established: Late 1920s
- Time zone: UTC+8:00 (HKT)

Kam Tsin Wai (Chinese: 金錢圍) is a village located in the south of Shek Kong Airfield, in Pat Heung, Yuen Long District, Hong Kong.

== Administration ==
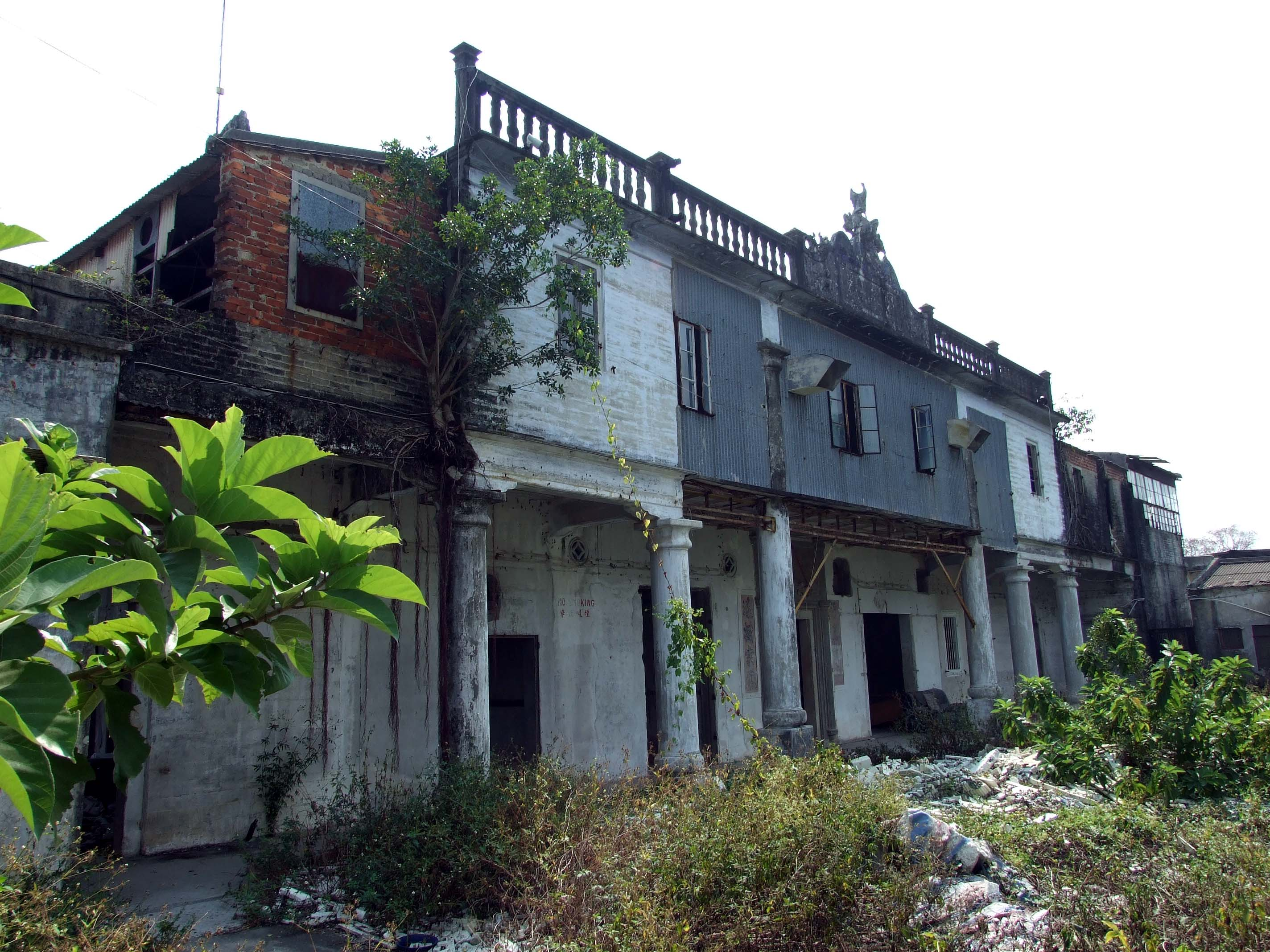
Kong Ha Wai (江廈圍), a Hakka residence near Kam Tsin Wai.

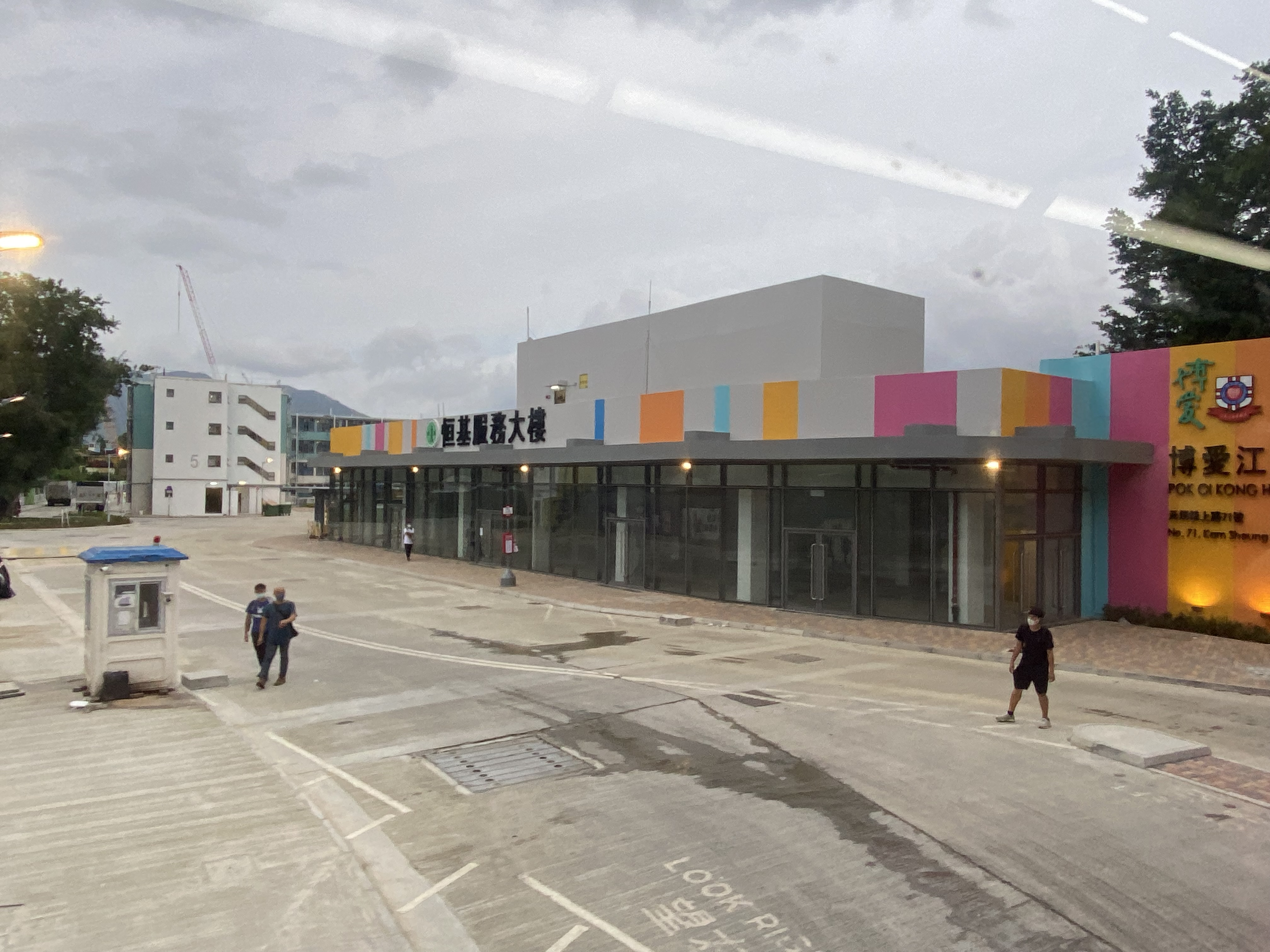
Pok Oi Kong Ha Wai Village (博愛江夏圍).

Kam Tsin Wai is a recognized village under the New Territories Small House Policy.

== History ==
The village was built for the settlement of members of the Cheng (鄭) clan, who moved from six villages in the Shing Mun Valley at the time of the construction of the Shing Mun Reservoir in 1928. At that time, most of the Chengs, including 540 villagers from 84 families, moved to the new village of Shing Mun San Tsuen in Kam Tin, while others dispersed to Wo Hop Shek and Pan Chung. A small number moved to Kam Tsin Wai. Kam Tsin Wai consisted of 25 village houses built by green bricks.

== Features ==
The Cheng Hon Pang Ancestral Hall (翰鵬鄭家祠) was built in 1929. It was later converted into a Catholic church called Our Lady of Sorrows Chapel (聖母七苦小堂), which was served from S.S. Peter and Paul Church (聖伯多祿聖保祿堂) in Yuen Long District (built in 1925 in Tung Tau Tsuen, S.S. Peter and Paul Church was relocated and rebuilt at No. 201 Castle Peak Road, near Shui Pin Tsuen, in 1958). The Chengs later redeemed the ancestral hall from the Catholic Church in the mid-1960s and the church at the hall was closed.
