= Shing Mun Reservoir =

Reservoir in New Territories, Hong Kong

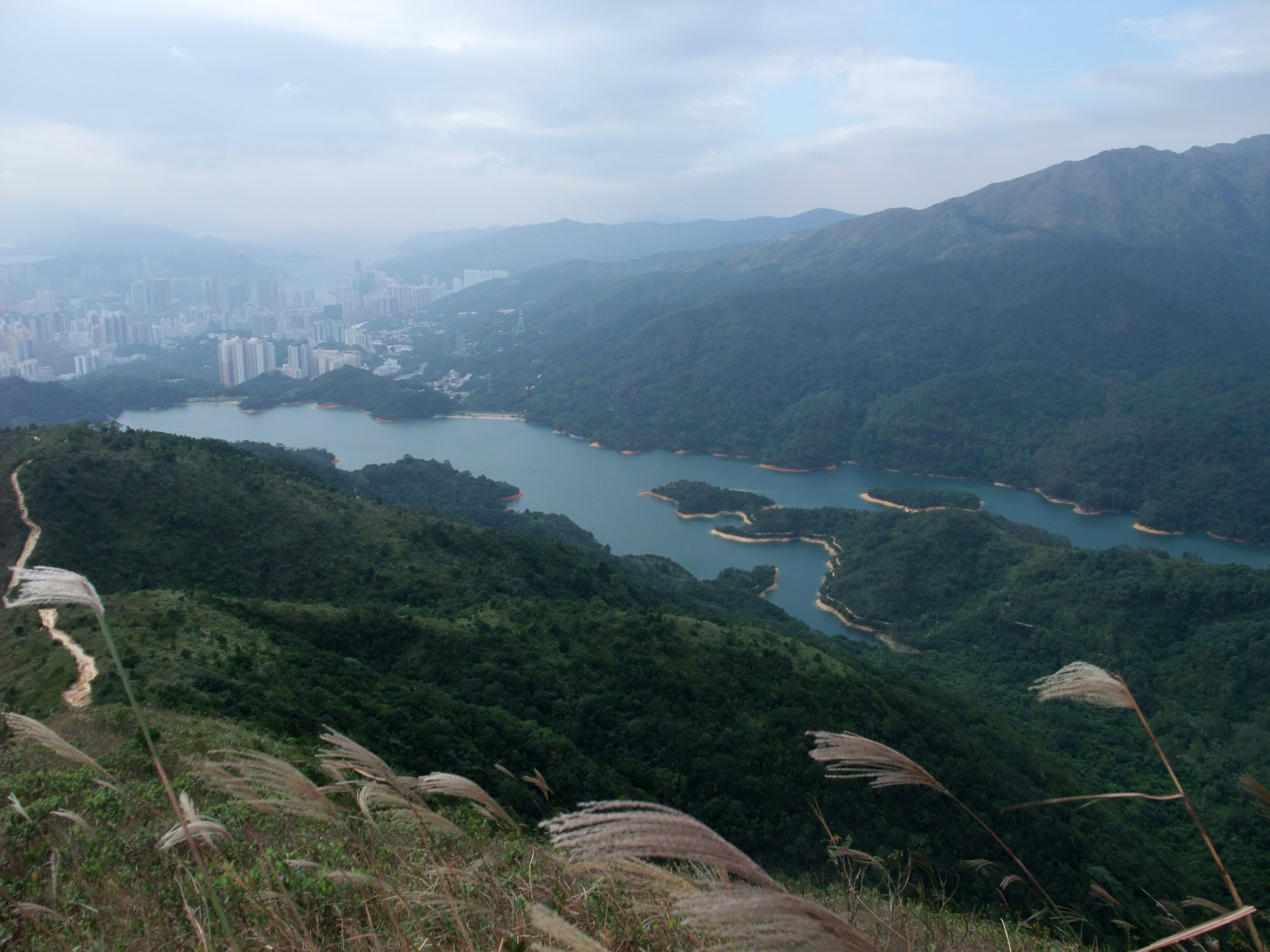
- Shing Mun Reservoir

- Location within Hong Kong
- Location: Hong Kong
- Coordinates: 22°23′10″N 114°8′50″E
- Type: Reservoir

Shing Mun Reservoir
- Traditional Chinese: 城門水塘
- Simplified Chinese: 城门水塘
- Literal meaning: City gate reservoir
Transcriptions
Standard Mandarin
- Hanyu Pinyin: Chéngmén Shuǐtáng
Yue: Cantonese
- Yale Romanization: Sìhng mùhn séui tòhng
- Jyutping: Sing4 mun4 soei2 tong4

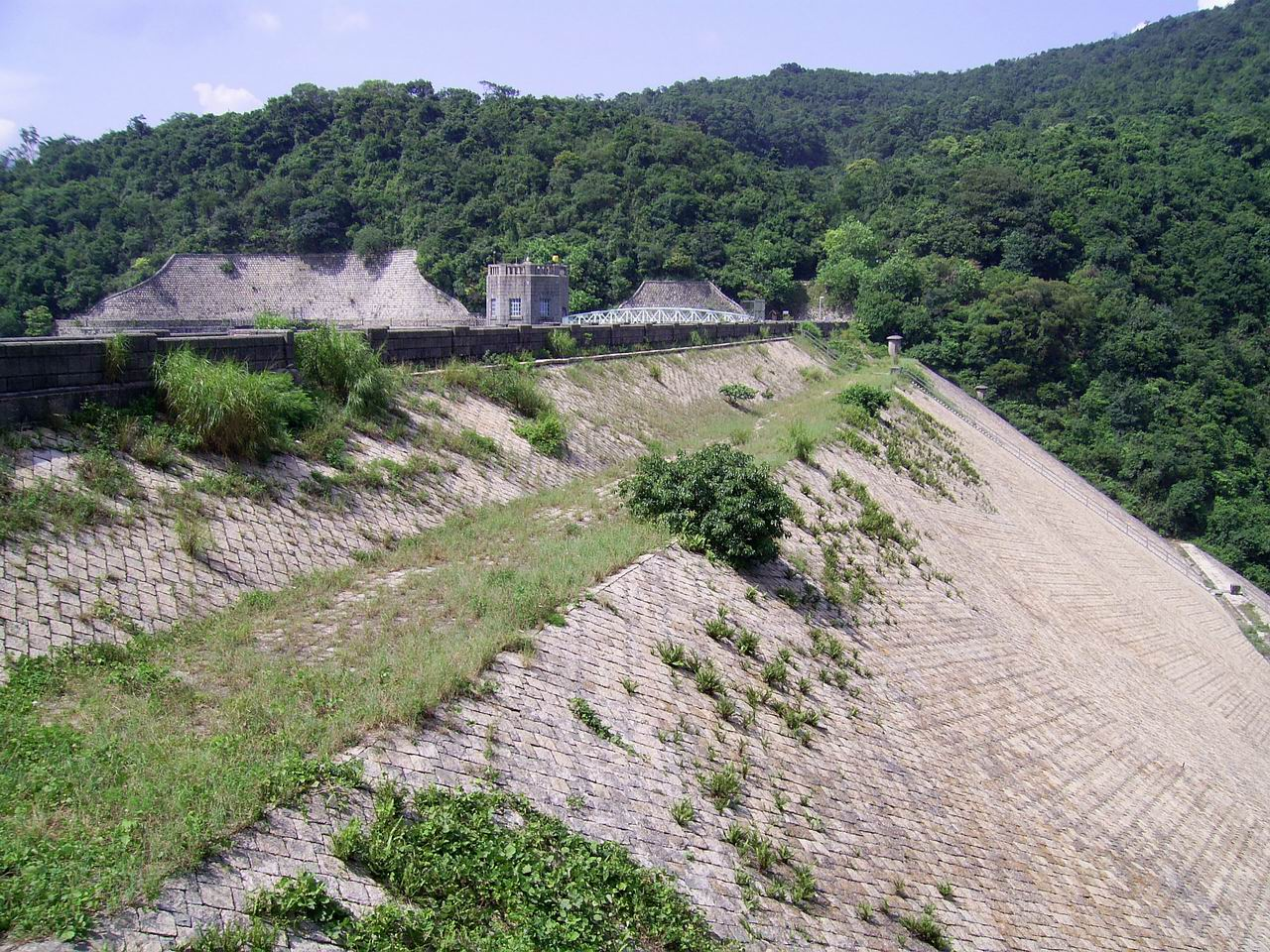
Shing Mun Reservoir Gorge Dam.

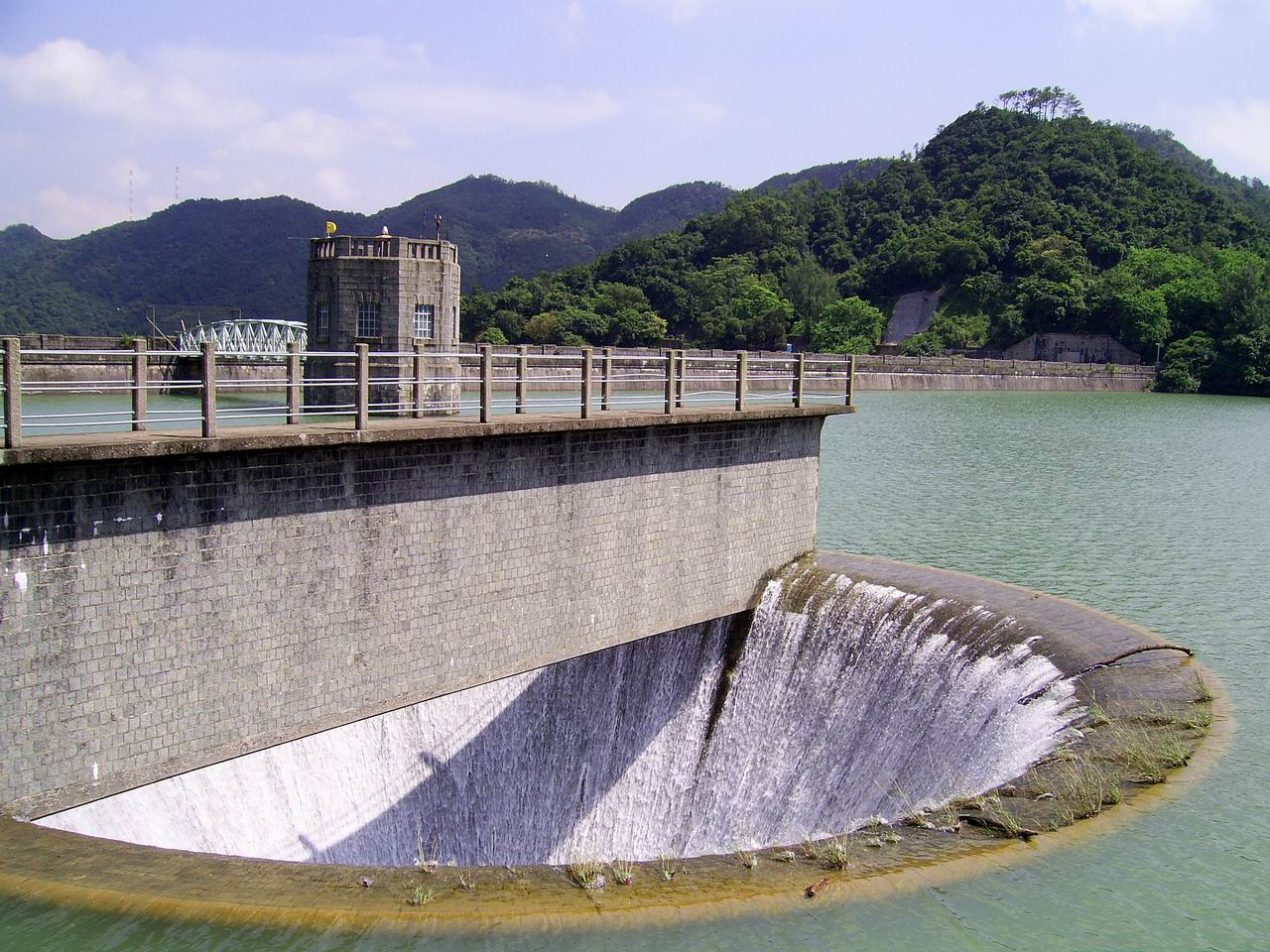
Reservoir bellmouth overflow and valve tower (in the background).

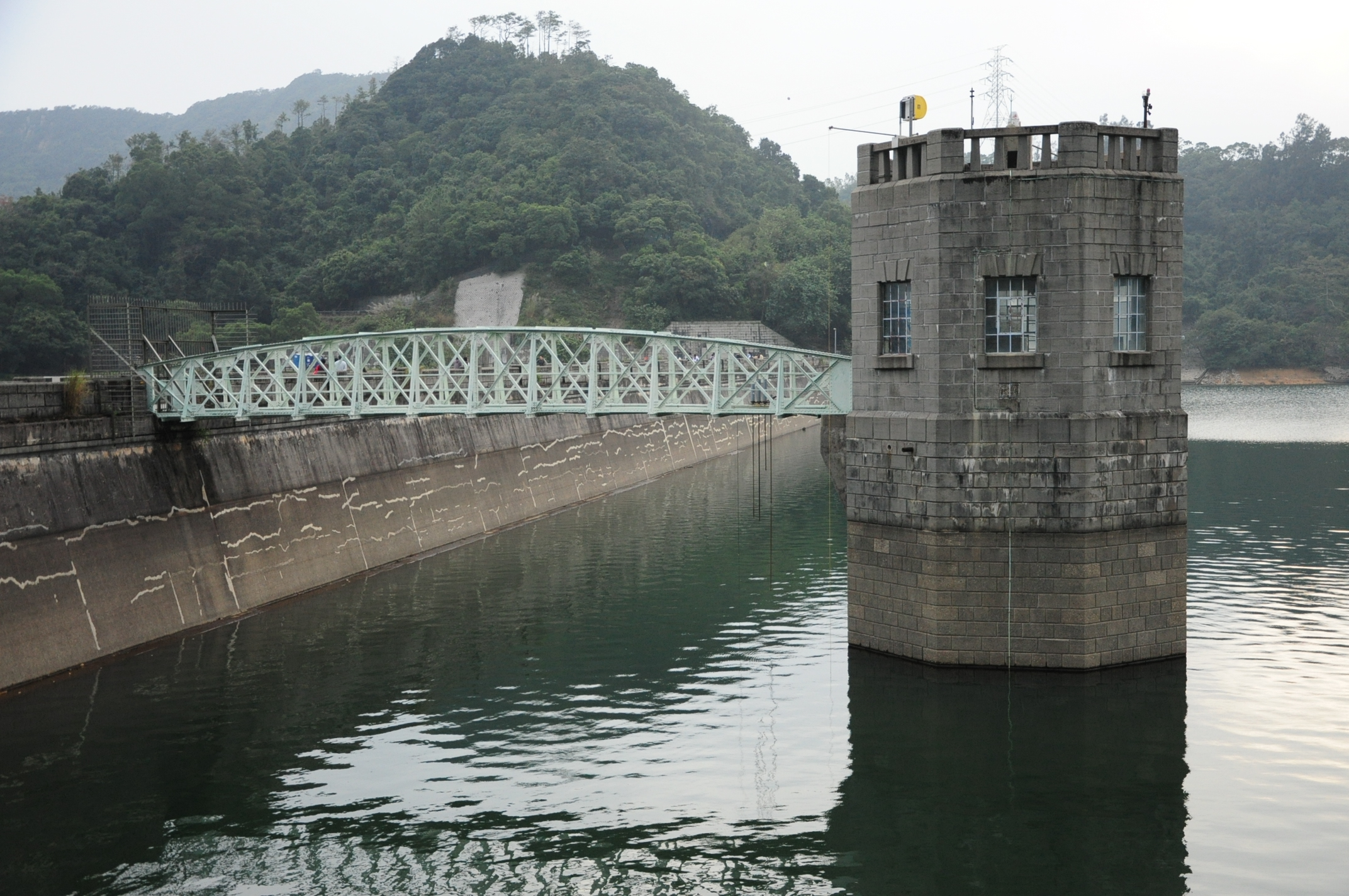
Valve tower and steel bridge.

Shing Mun Reservoir is a reservoir in Hong Kong. It is located in Shing Mun, the area between Tsuen Wan and Sha Tin, in the New Territories. Administratively, it is located within the boundaries of Tsuen Wan District.

== History ==
=== Human life in Shing Mun Reservoir ===
Several hundred years ago, the area around the reservoir was a dense forest with very few inhabitants. At least from 1646 to 1659, Southern Ming loyalist Li Wanrong (李萬榮), leading a cohort numbering in thousands, controlled Kowloon and much of today's New Territories, collecting taxes and fortifying villages, including erecting a fortress in the lower part of the Shing Mun River valley. Hence the area became known as Shing Mun or "fortified gate".

After 1669, when the Great Clearance imposed by the Kangxi Emperor of the Qing dynasty was rescinded, many Hakkas settled in this area, growing rice, tea and pineapples. In the early 20th century, there were seven villages in the area.

=== Construction ===
The Shing Mun Reservoir was built as part of the Shing Mun Water Supply Scheme formulated in 1923 to meet the increasing demand for fresh water due to the urbanisation of Kowloon. To a design by London dam engineers Messrs Binnie, Deacon & Gourley, construction began in 1933 of a dam 122 metres wide and 35 metres high which, upon completion, had a capacity of 4 billion litres. By the conclusion of Phase Three of the scheme in 1937, the dam had been extended to 85 metres in height and 13.6 billion litres capacity. The name Jubilee Reservoir (銀禧水塘) was designated to celebrate the Silver Jubilee (1935) of King George V of the United Kingdom, though the name has fallen into disuse.

=== Effect on locals ===
The local inhabitants were resettled in other parts of the New Territories, including Shing Mun San Tsuen, Wo Hop Shek, Pan Chung and Kam Tsin Wai. Some of the old villages are now submerged. The remains of other villages and houses can be seen in the woods on the side of the reservoir. The remains of Gin Drinkers Line on the nearby hills show the defences of British forces against the Japanese invasion during World War II.

== Features ==
The main dam, or Gorge Dam, located at the southern end of the reservoir incorporated several technological novelties at the time of its construction. The dam is an early form of concrete-faced rockfill dam with the upstream reinforced concrete face being near vertical, supported on a mass concrete thrust block. The 85m high dam was the then (1936) highest dam in the old British Empire.

The bellmouth overflow is a circular masonry structure in the reservoir surmounted by a masonry footbridge connecting it to the shore. This uncommon feature replaces the overspill weirs found at other reservoirs. Designed in 1935 by Geoffrey Binnie of Binnie, Deacon & Gourley, the bellmouth overflow received the Telford Premium Award from the Institution of Civil Engineers.

The subsidiary 25m high Pineapple Pass Dam consists of earth, rockfill and concrete core.

== Fauna ==
Macaque monkeys are common in the area.

== Conservation ==
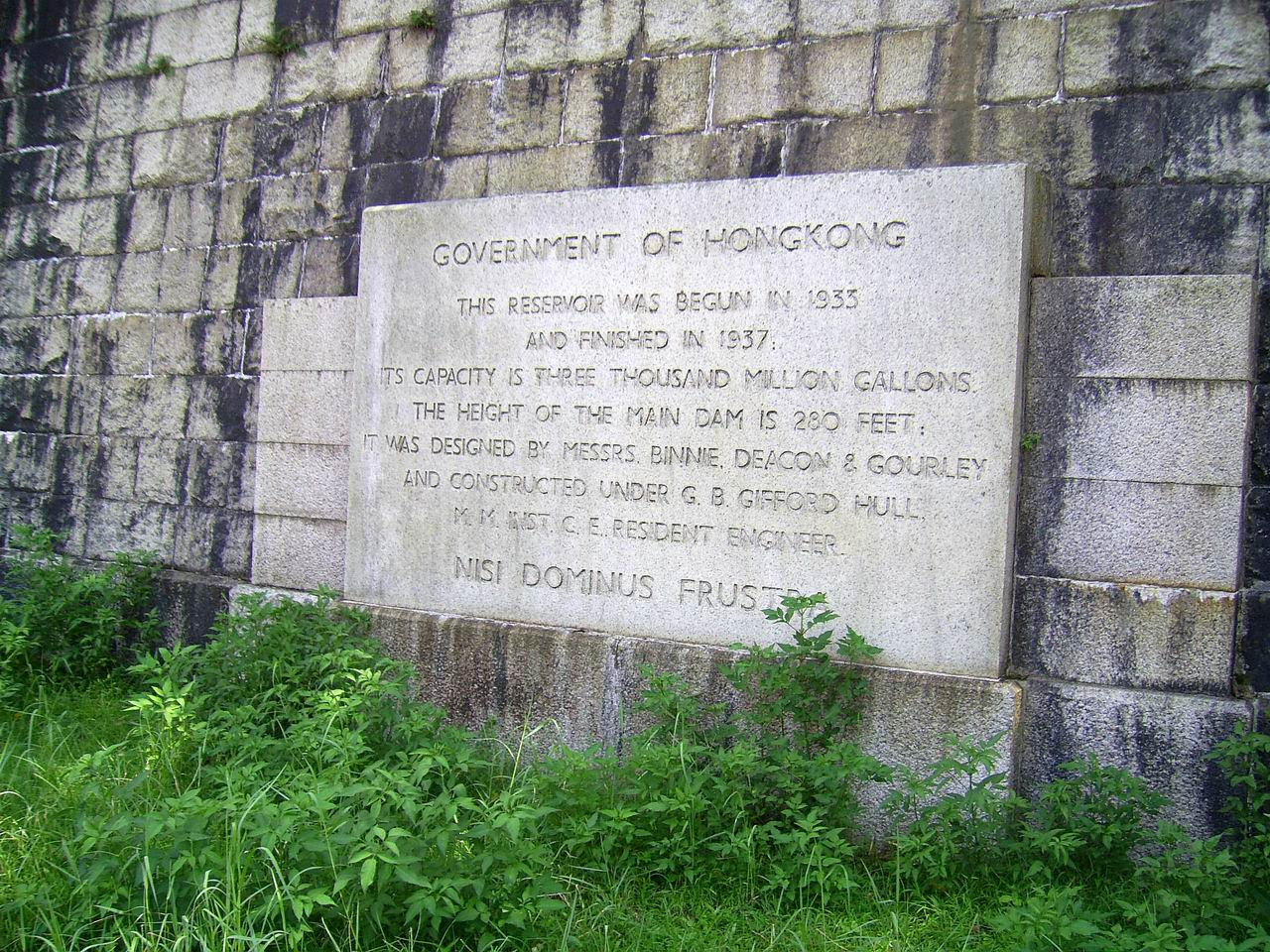
Memorial Stone of Shing Mun Reservoir.

The gorge dam, the valve tower and the bellmouth overflow are listed as Grade I historic buildings, while the steel bridge of the reservoir is listed as a Grade II historic building.

The Memorial Stone of Shing Mun Reservoir was declared as a monument in September 2009. It was part of a batch of 41 pre-World War II waterworks structures located in six reservoir areas, namely Pok Fu Lam Reservoir, Tai Tam Group of Reservoirs, Wong Nai Chung Reservoir, Kowloon Reservoir, Shing Mun (Jubilee) Reservoir and Aberdeen Reservoir, that were declared at that time.

To preserve the natural environment of the reservoir, the surrounding area is managed under Shing Mun Country Park.

The Shing Mun Fung Shui Woodland covers about 6 hectares near the northeastern end of the Shing Mun Reservoir. Historically related to the former nearby Tai Wai Village, that was evacuated in 1929, the woodland was protected by the villagers in accordance with feng shui traditions. The woodland has been designated as a Site of Special Scientific Interest since 1975.

== Trails ==
Two walking trails, Wilson Trail and MacLehose Trail, cross at the side of the reservoir.

== See also ==
- Lower Shing Mun Reservoir
