= Miu Ko Toi =

- 妙高台
- Location within Hong Kong

Highest point
- Elevation: 765 m (2,510 ft)
- Coordinates: 22°24′13.15″N 114°7′15.05″E

Geography
- Location: Hong Kong

Miu Ko Toi (Chinese: 妙高台) is a peak in Hong Kong. It is situated in New Territories and stands at a height of 779 metres (2,556 ft) above the sea level. It is one of the subpeaks of the tallest mountain Tai Mo Shan and the fifth highest summit in Hong Kong.

== Name ==
The Cantonese name Miu Ko Toi (Chinese: 妙高台; Jyutping: Miu^{6} Gou^{1} Toi^{4}) literally means "Fantastic High Lookout".

== Access ==
Miu Ko Toi is only accessible by foot and is south west of Tai Mo Shan. In between trail markers M150 and M151 of Tai Mo Shan Road, there is the entrance for a trail called Heung Shek Path. Assuming that you are walking up toward Tai Mo Shan's summit, turning right when you see Heung Shek Path will lead you to Miu Ko Toi's summit.

== See also ==
- List of mountains, peaks and hills in Hong Kong
- Tai Mo Shan
