= Ma Wo =

Village in Tai Po, Hong Kong

Ma Wo 馬窩
- Village
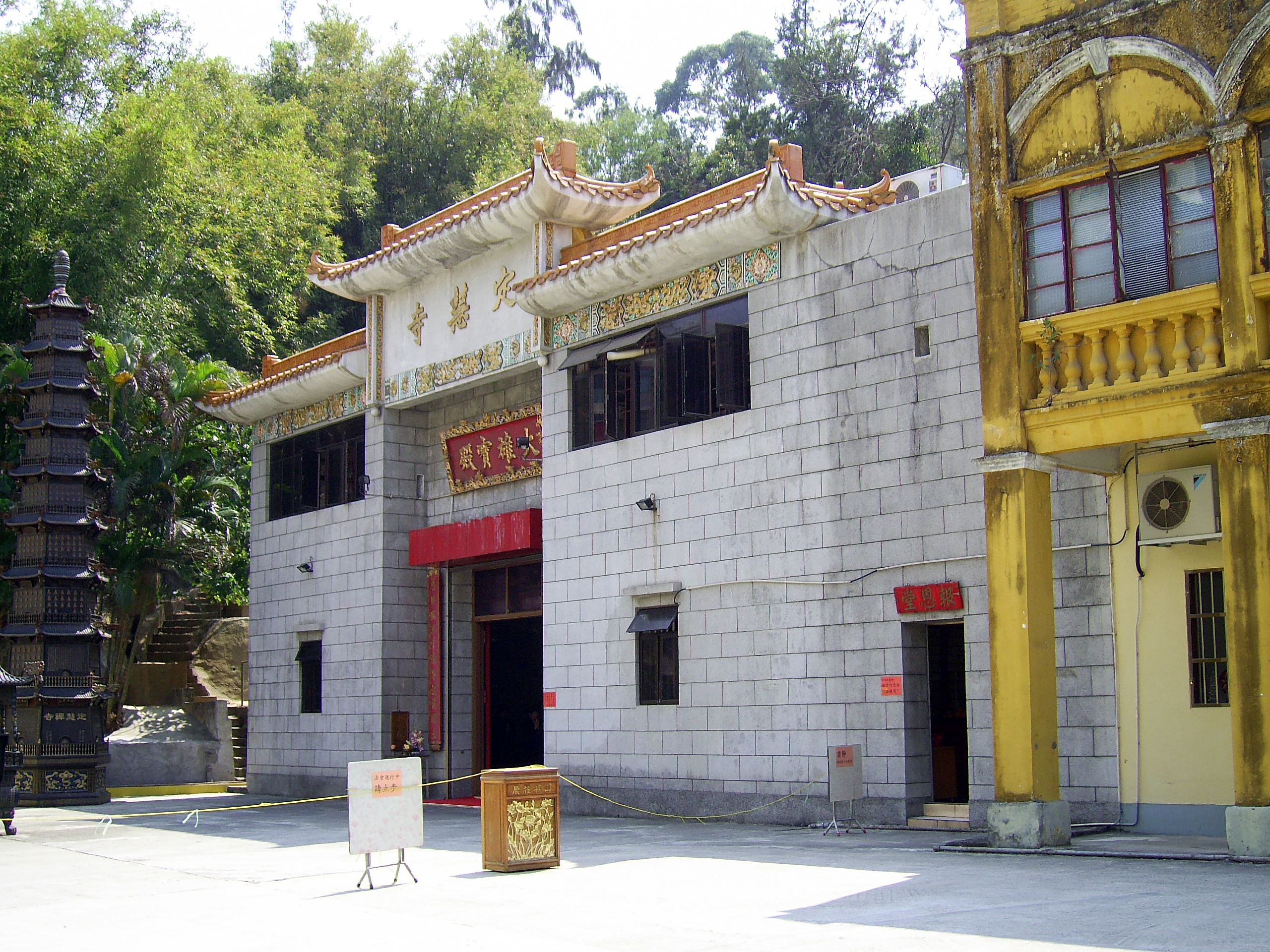
- Ting Wai Monastery in Ma Wo.
- Interactive map of Ma Wo
- Coordinates: 22.443017°N 114.160665°E
- Country: China
- SAR: Hong Kong
- Region: New Territories
- District: Tai Po District
- Time zone: UTC+8 (Hong Kong Time)

Ma Wo (Chinese: 馬窩) is a village in Tai Po and the name of valley the village situated. The valley became a residential area when several private housing estates, like Classical Gardens, Dynasty View and Grand Dynasty View, were built in the lower side of the valley. Ma Wo hosts several Buddhist monasteries. The most famous one is Ting Wai Monastery (定慧寺).

== Administration ==
Ma Wo is one of the villages represented within the Tai Po Rural Committee. For electoral purposes, Ma Wo is part of the San Fu constituency, which was formerly represented by Max Wu Yiu-cheong until May 2021.

== Geography ==
The area of Ma Wo is hilly and cut into half by Tolo Highway, connected only by a tunnel for pedestrian and bicycle. The west is much higher than the east. The higher Ma Wo is sparsely populated and the lower is much crowded. The lower land is surrounded by a hill Kam Shan to its north and To Yuen Tung to its south-east, Pan Chung to its far east.

== Transportation ==
Tolo Highway runs across the area but no entrance and exit there. In the lower land, Ma Wo Road is its main access leading to Wan Tau Tong and Pan Chung Road is a minor road leading to Pan Chung. There is no road spanning into high land though there is a service road for water services above from Pun Chun Yuen. The road ends near Ma Wo and a trail continues to Wun Yiu. The service road and the trail are part of the eighth section of Wilson Trail across Hong Kong.
