= Kwun Yam Shan =

Kwun Yam Shan (Chinese: 觀音山) may refer to:

- Kwun Yam Shan (Yuen Long District), a mountain in Hong Kong
- Kwun Yam Shan (Sha Tin District), a village in Hong Kong
