= Tai Mo Shan =

Highest peak in Hong Kong

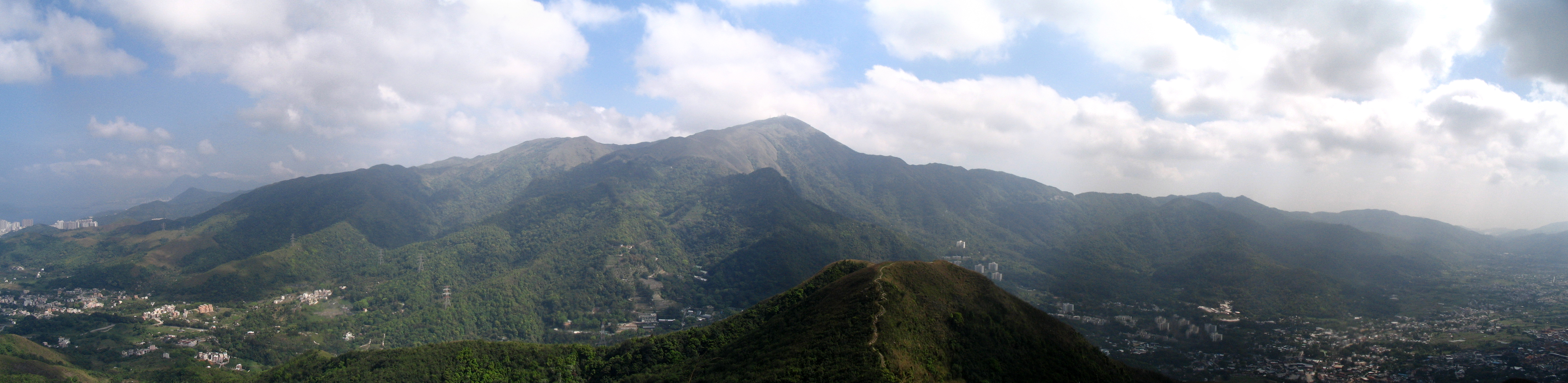
- Tai Mo Shan, viewed from Tai To Yan in April 2008

Highest point
- Elevation: 957 m (3,140 ft); HKPD
- Coordinates: 22°24′42.52″N 114°7′23.32″E

Naming
- Native name: Tai Mo Shan (English); 大帽山 (Cantonese)

Geography
- Location within Hong Kong
- Location: Centre of the New Territories, Hong Kong

Tai Mo Shan
- Chinese: 大帽山
Transcriptions
Standard Mandarin
- Hanyu Pinyin: Dà mào shān
Yue: Cantonese
- Yale Romanization: Daaih mouh sāan
- Jyutping: Daai6 mou6 saan1

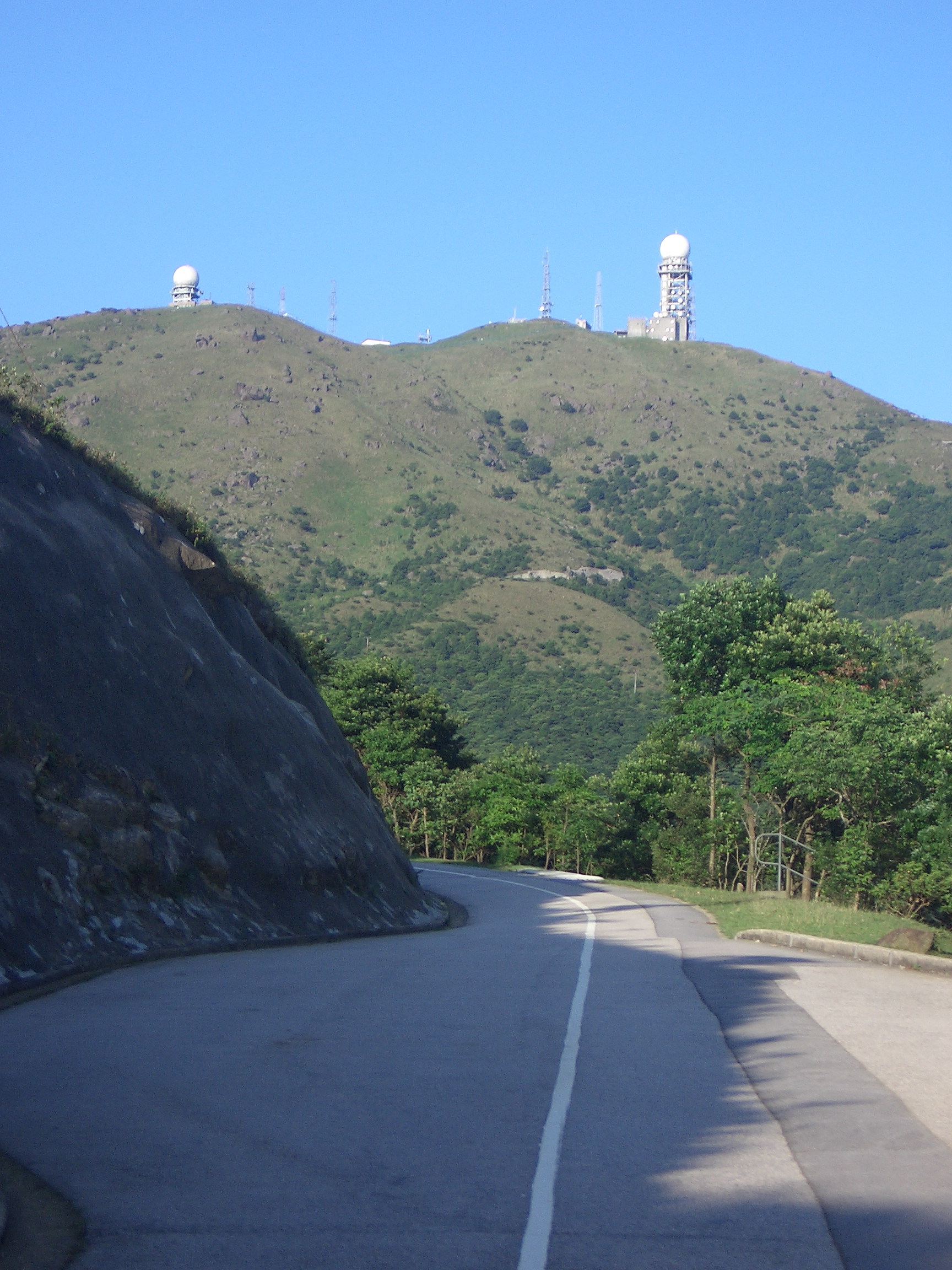
Tai Mo Shan Road, and Tai Mo Shan peak in distance in August 2006

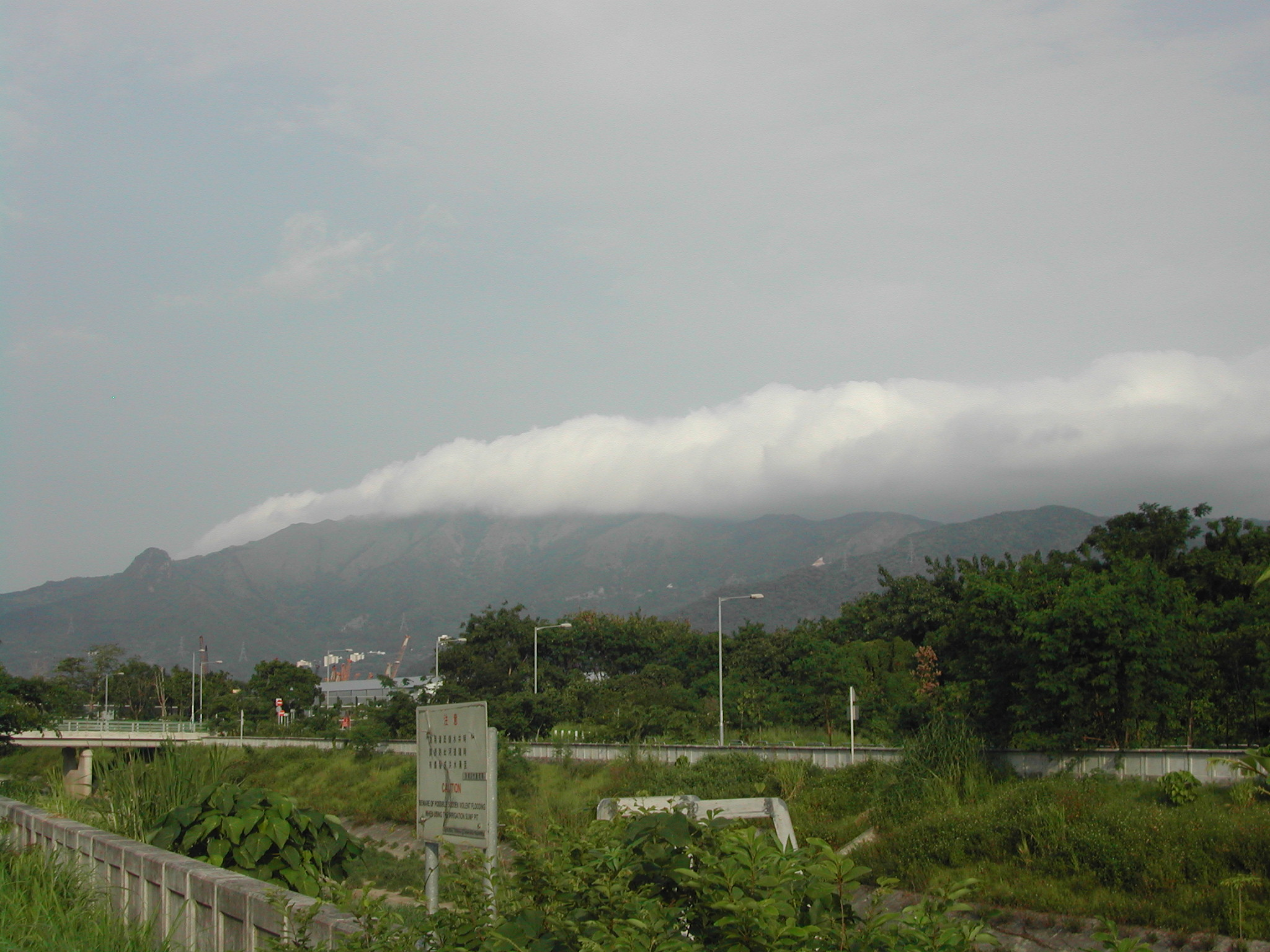
Tai Mo Shan capped in mist in June 2005

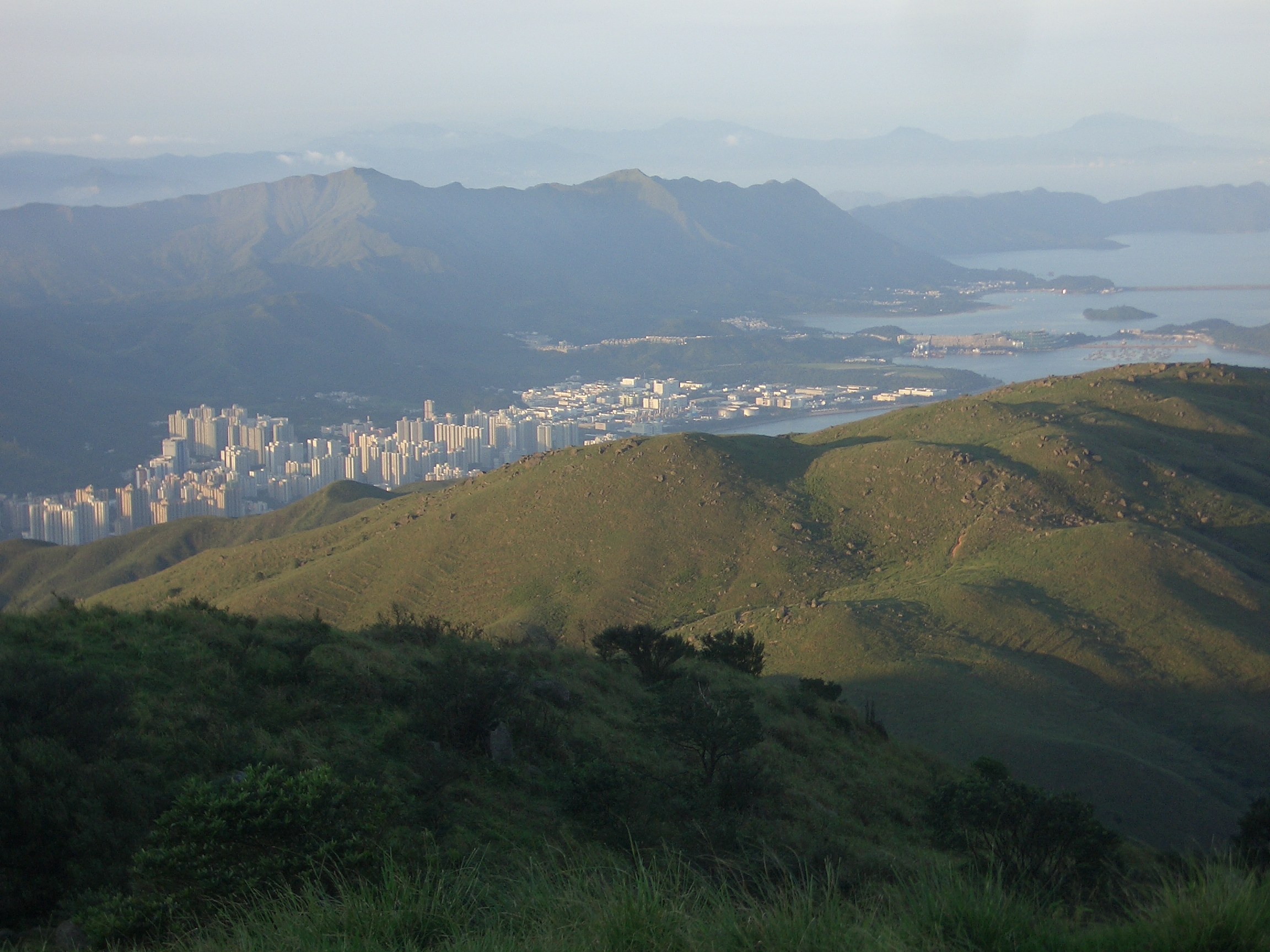
Tai Po, as seen from top of Tai Mo Shan. MacLehose Trail Stage 8 is visible on the ridge of the mountain on the right.

Tai Mo Shan (大帽山) is the highest peak in Hong Kong, with an elevation of 957 metres (3,140 ft) above the Hong Kong Principal Datum, or around 956 metres (3,136 ft) above mean sea level. It is located at approximately the geographical centre of the New Territories.

The Tai Mo Shan Country Park covers an area of 14.40 square kilometres (5.56 sq mi) around Tai Mo Shan. It is located to the north of Tai Lam Country Park. The 35-metre-high (115 ft) Long Falls at Ng Tung Chai is the highest waterfall in Hong Kong.

== Geography ==
Tai Mo Shan has a steep northwestern slope and less steep southern slope. Since it is the tallest mountain in Hong Kong, it forms a barrier that blocks the monsoon from the south, the rain shadow leading to the dryness of some of the northern and northwestern parts of the New Territories.

The whole Tai Mo Shan mountain range, known as Kwun Fu Mountain (官富山, named after the salt field Kwun Fu Cheung (官富場) in present-day Kowloon Bay) in Ming and Qing dynasties, covers over 350 square kilometres (140 sq mi), and stretches from Tai Lam Chung Reservoir in the West near Tuen Mun and Ma On Shan in the east and the mountains of Kowloon and Clear Water Bay in the south. Two other significant coastal peaks, the Lantau Peak (934m) on Lantau Island and Mount Wutong (943.7m) across the border in Shenzhen are approximately 27 kilometres (17 mi) to the southwest and 21 1/2 kilometres (13.4 mi) to the northeast respectively.

=== Subpeaks ===
There are a few subpeaks that are given names in the Tai Mo Shan area, including:

- Sze Fong Shan (785 metres (2,575 ft))
- Wo Yang Shan (767 metres (2,516 ft))
- Miu Ko Toi (765 metres (2,510 ft))
- Wo Tong Kong lower (656 metres (2,152 ft)) - there is an upper summit historically logged on this page at 702 metres (2,303 ft). It is approximately 1 km North East of the lower summit along the same ridge. However it is just a point on the ridge with virtually no prominence from the parent peak, Tai Mo Shan. The lower peak has enough prominence to be considered an independent summit, but this has not been verified by a surveyor.
- Lin Fa Shan, Tsuen Wan (579 metres (1,900 ft))
- Shek Lung Kung, Tsuen Wan (474 metres (1,555 ft))
- Tin Fu Tsai Shan (461 metres (1,512 ft))
- Ha Fa Shan, Tsuen Wan (315 metres (1,033 ft))

== Geology ==
Tai Mo Shan is an inactive volcano dating from the Jurassic period. A small hill known as "Kwun Yam Shan" near the mountain still vents warm air through cracks in the rocks that lead all the way to the mantle. The holes that exhale warm air are known as "hot pots". When the surface temperature is cold, and the warmth of the expelled air is clearly discernible, this phenomenon is referred to by locals as "dragon's breath". If the air temperature at the summit is 6 degrees Celsius, then the air emerging from the interior of Kwun Yum Shan is somewhere between 13 and 21 degrees Celsius. These "hot pots" are remnants of the active volcano's superheated steam vents.

The area's volcanic rocks are mainly coarse ash crystal tuff. While Granodiorite, which is a kind of granite formed about 150 million years ago, intruded into the volcanic rocks.

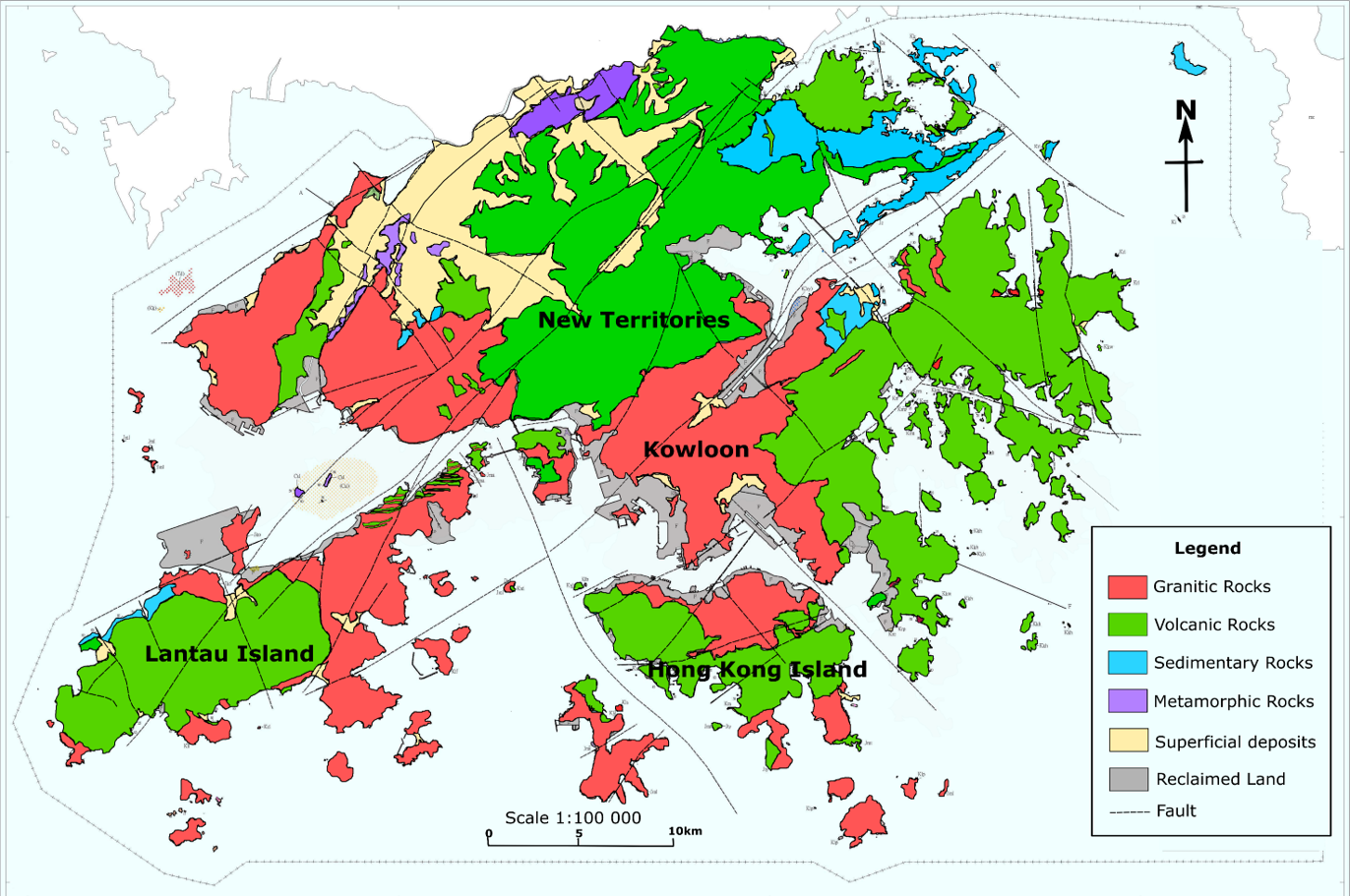
Geological map of Hong Kong showing the distribution of faults and different rock types in Hong Kong. Tai Mo Shan is in the Green area (Volcanic Rock) in central New Territories

== Climate ==
Under the Köppen climate classification, Tai Mo Shan features a humid subtropical climate (Cwa), bordering a subtropical highland climate (Cwb). Due to the height of the mountain, Tai Mo Shan is claimed to be Hong Kong's most misty area, as it is often covered in clouds. In summer it is frequently covered with cumulus clouds, especially on rainy days, and in winter stratus clouds and fog often cover the peak. It is not uncommon for temperatures to drop below freezing point during the winter. A record low of −6.0 °C (21.2 °F) was seen in the January 2016 East Asia cold wave. Since the Tai Mo Shan weather station was established in 1997, it has never measured a temperature exceeding 30.0 °C (86.0 °F), and the highest maximum temperature was measured as 29.5 °C (85.1 °F).

Climate data for Tai Mo Shan, elevation 955 m (3,133 ft), (1997–2022)
Month	Jan	Feb	Mar	Apr	May	Jun	Jul	Aug	Sep	Oct	Nov	Dec	Year
Record high °C (°F)	22.2 (72.0)	23.2 (73.8)	24.3 (75.7)	27.4 (81.3)	28.8 (83.8)	29.5 (85.1)	29.4 (84.9)	29.4 (84.9)	28.9 (84.0)	27.3 (81.1)	25.2 (77.4)	23.7 (74.7)	29.5 (85.1)
Mean daily maximum °C (°F)	14.1 (57.4)	15.1 (59.2)	17.2 (63.0)	19.9 (67.8)	22.3 (72.1)	23.5 (74.3)	24.5 (76.1)	24.6 (76.3)	23.8 (74.8)	21.2 (70.2)	18.5 (65.3)	14.8 (58.6)	20.0 (67.9)
Daily mean °C (°F)	10.6 (51.1)	11.8 (53.2)	14.3 (57.7)	17.3 (63.1)	20.1 (68.2)	21.7 (71.1)	22.3 (72.1)	22.2 (72.0)	21.2 (70.2)	18.3 (64.9)	15.5 (59.9)	11.5 (52.7)	17.2 (63.0)
Mean daily minimum °C (°F)	8.0 (46.4)	9.3 (48.7)	11.9 (53.4)	15.3 (59.5)	18.4 (65.1)	20.1 (68.2)	20.6 (69.1)	20.4 (68.7)	19.4 (66.9)	16.4 (61.5)	13.3 (55.9)	8.9 (48.0)	15.2 (59.3)
Record low °C (°F)	−6.0 (21.2)	−1.8 (28.8)	−2.0 (28.4)	5.6 (42.1)	9.3 (48.7)	14.0 (57.2)	16.8 (62.2)	16.8 (62.2)	13.3 (55.9)	5.7 (42.3)	−0.3 (31.5)	−3.3 (26.1)	−6.0 (21.2)
Average precipitation mm (inches)	42.5 (1.67)	51.8 (2.04)	101.1 (3.98)	143.3 (5.64)	337.3 (13.28)	568.8 (22.39)	416.9 (16.41)	452.5 (17.81)	286.5 (11.28)	94.6 (3.72)	40.5 (1.59)	27.2 (1.07)	2,562.9 (100.90)
Average relative humidity (%)	82.2	88.0	89.9	91.7	94.3	96.2	95.3	93.6	90.4	86.7	85.4	79.4	89.4
Average dew point °C (°F)	7.5 (45.5)	9.6 (49.3)	12.6 (54.7)	15.8 (60.4)	18.9 (66.0)	21.0 (69.8)	21.3 (70.3)	21.1 (70.0)	19.4 (66.9)	16.1 (61.0)	12.4 (54.3)	7.2 (45.0)	15.2 (59.4)
Source: Hong Kong Observatory

== Vegetation ==
In the past, Tai Mo Shan was famous for a type of green tea, called mist or cloud tea, which grew wild on the mountain side. Occasionally, local people can still be seen picking the tea shoots for brewing green tea.

More than 1,500 species of plants have been recorded in Tai Mo Shan including 27 species of native wild orchids, the protected Chinese Lily (Lilium brownii) which mostly grows on the east side of the Mountain, 24 species of native ferns, including tree ferns, of which a total of only 4 tree ferns species have been recorded around the entire mountain, 19 species of native grasses, and 7 species of native bamboos. Camellia sinensis var. waldenae (formerly Camellia waldenae) are also found on the mountain.

A few types of wild orchids also grow in the streams of Tai Mo Shan including the Chinese pholidota orchid, Hong Kong's most common orchid, and the bamboo orchid, so called because of a distinct stem that looks like bamboo, which also grows in the streams of Tai Mo Shan.

During the Japanese occupation of Hong Kong in World War II, most of the trees in the park were cut down and extensive reforestation was carried out after the war. Trees that were planted are mostly non-native such as Pinus massoniana, Acacia confusa, Lophostemon confertus, and paper bark tree. The area has now become one of Hong Kong's major forest plantations.

The south-east slopes of Tai Mo Shan are covered with patches of well developed montane forest. The area, covering 130 hectares, was designated as a Site of Special Scientific Interest in 1975.

== Wildlife ==
Local wildlife consists of birds, snakes and butterflies. There are also freshwater crabs, feral dogs, feral cats, oxen, porcupines and wild boar.

== History ==
In 1986, a 34-hour blaze destroyed 282,500 trees at Shing Mun and Tai Mo Shan and ravaged 7.40 km² of countryside.

Tai Mo Shan Country Park was formally designated on 23 February 1979.

== Access ==
The summit of Tai Mo Shan is not accessible to visitors, as it is occupied by a Hong Kong Observatory (ex-RAF) weather radar station. It was reported in July 2014 that the station additionally houses facilities of the People's Liberation Army.

== See also ==
- List of mountains, peaks and hills in Hong Kong
- Country parks and conservation in Hong Kong
- Kadoorie Farm and Botanic Garden
