= Shing Mun =

- Traditional Chinese: 城門
- Simplified Chinese: 城门
- Literal meaning: City gates
Transcriptions
Standard Mandarin
- Hanyu Pinyin: Chéngmén
Yue: Cantonese
- Jyutping: sing4 mun4

Shing Mun (Chinese: 城門) is an area between Tsuen Wan and Sha Tin in the New Territories of Hong Kong. It used to be, as suggested by its Chinese characters, a gate between the two areas separated by a range of hills.

== History ==
Before the construction of Shing Mun Reservoir, there were several villages near the valley. Some of these villages were later relocated near the Tsuen Wan entrance of Shing Mun Tunnels.

The area played a major role in the defense against Japanese Invasion of Hong Kong. Gin Drinkers Line is across the area.

== Featured named after Shing Mun ==
Because there were many major constructions and geography features in the area, Shing Mun may mean one of the following by context:

- Shing Mun Country Park, which contains the Shing Mun Reservoir
- Shing Mun Redoubt, which housed command HQ for the Gin Drinkers Line
- Shing Mun River
- Shing Mun San Tsuen
- Shing Mun Tunnels
- Shing Mun Valley
