= Lei Muk Shue =

Coordinates: 22.37878°N 114.13547°E

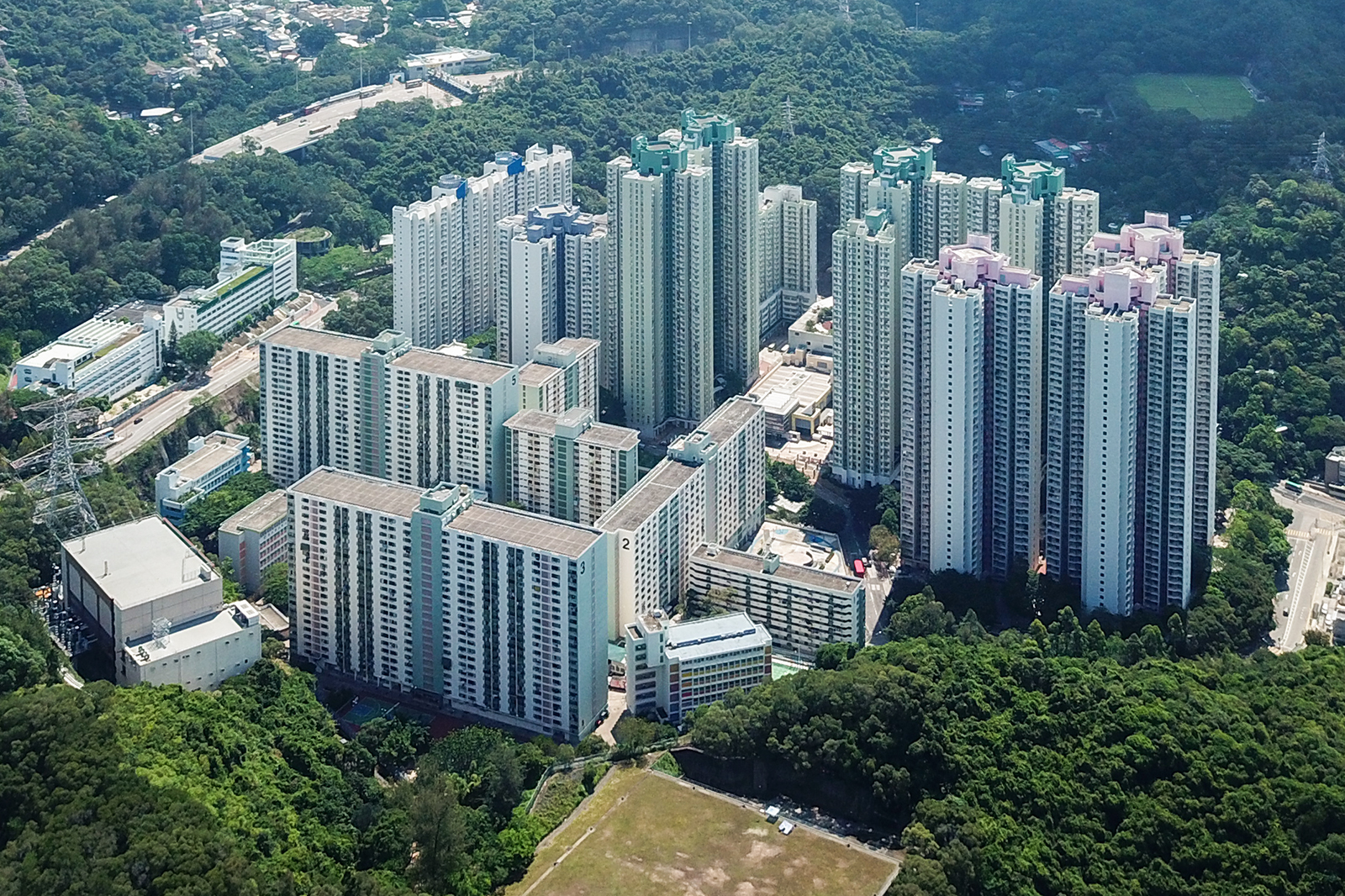
- Lei Muk Shue Estate
- Interactive map of Lei Muk Shue

Lei Muk Shue (Chinese: 梨木樹), formerly Lai Muk Shu, is an area in East Tsuen Wan of Hong Kong. It includes the area surrounding Lei Muk Shue Estate on a hill slope near Wo Yi Hop. However, the proper Lei Muk Shue was a village located south of the junction of Castle Peak Road and Lei Muk Road, near the former river of Kwai Chung.

== Name ==
Lei Muk Shue (梨木樹) is a Cantonese name which literally means pearwood tree, or simply pear tree. The wood of pear tree is good for making furniture. However the reason for naming the village pear tree is not clear, but it is not uncommon for indigenous Chinese villages to be named after some nearby geographic features.

The name Lei Muk Shue at its proper location was long forgotten during the development of Tsuen Wan New Town, remaining only in a road, Lei Muk Road, lit. pearwood road. The name was given to the public housing estate far north on the hill slope.

== Education ==
Lei Muk Shue is in Primary One Admission (POA) School Net 64, which includes multiple aided schools (schools operated independently of the government but funded with government money); none of the schools in the net are government schools.

== See also ==
- Shing Mun Valley
