= Wo Yeung Shan =

Peak in Hong Kong

Coordinates: 22°25′03″N 114°08′10″E

- 禾秧山
- Location within Hong Kong

Highest point
- Elevation: 767 m (2,516 ft)

Geography
- Location: Centre of New Territories, Hong Kong

Wo Yeung Shan (Chinese: 禾秧山), officially known as Wo Yang Shan, is the sixth-highest peak in Hong Kong at a height of 767 metres (2,516 ft). It is located south east of Tai Mo Shan in the New Territories, between Tsuen Wan District and Tai Po District.

== Name ==
The Cantonese name Wo Yeung Shan (Chinese: : 禾秧山; Jyutping: Wo^{4} Joeng^{1} Saan^{1}) literally means "Rice Seedling Mountain".

== See also ==
- List of mountains, peaks and hills in Hong Kong
