= Kwun Yam Shan (Yuen Long District) =

Hill in Yuen Long, Hong Kong

Kwun Yam Shan, Hong Kong
- 觀音山
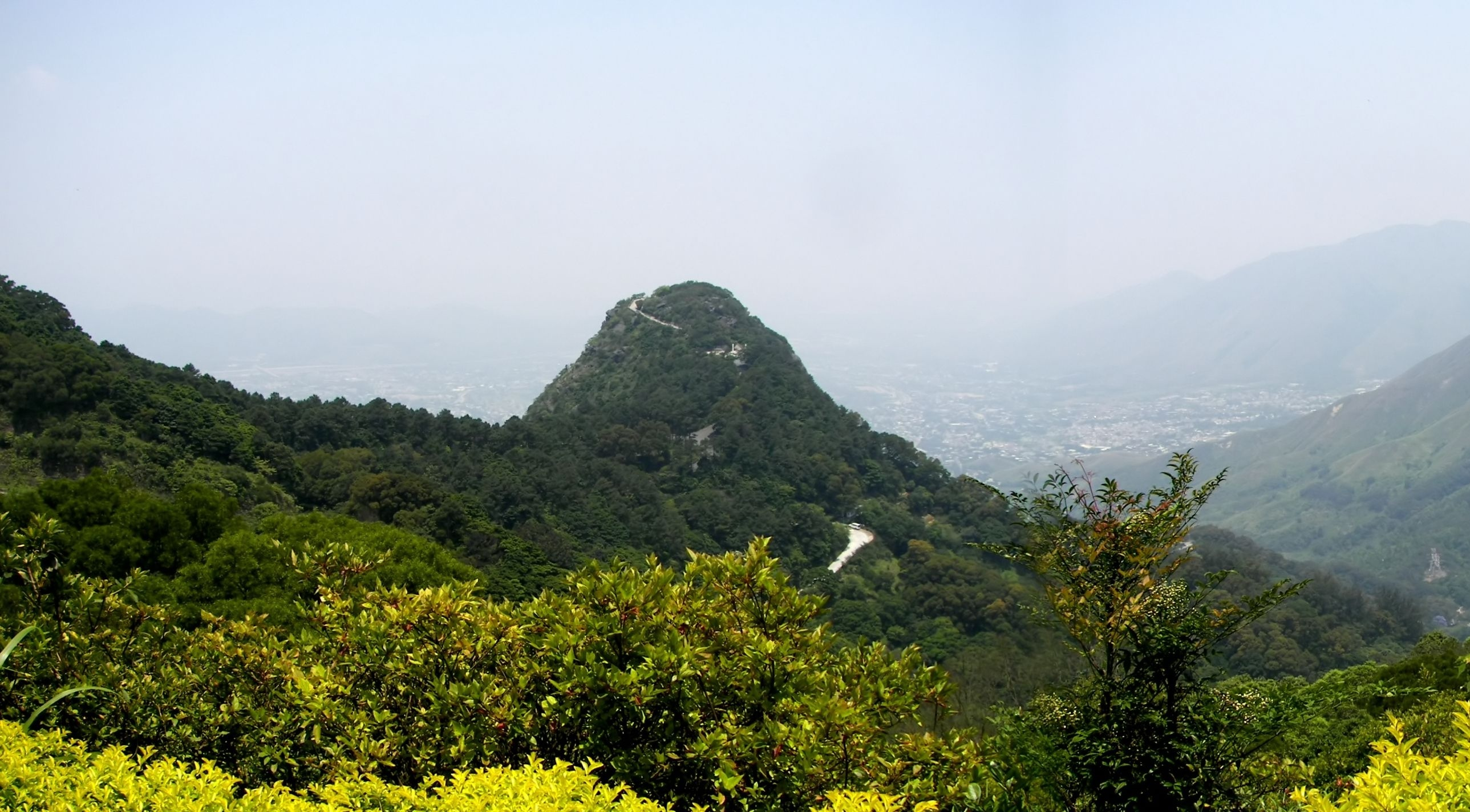
- View of Kwun Yam Shan

Highest point
- Elevation: 546 m (1,791 ft)
- Coordinates: 22°25′33.78″N 114°7′3.85″E

Geography
- Location within Hong Kong
- Location: Hong Kong

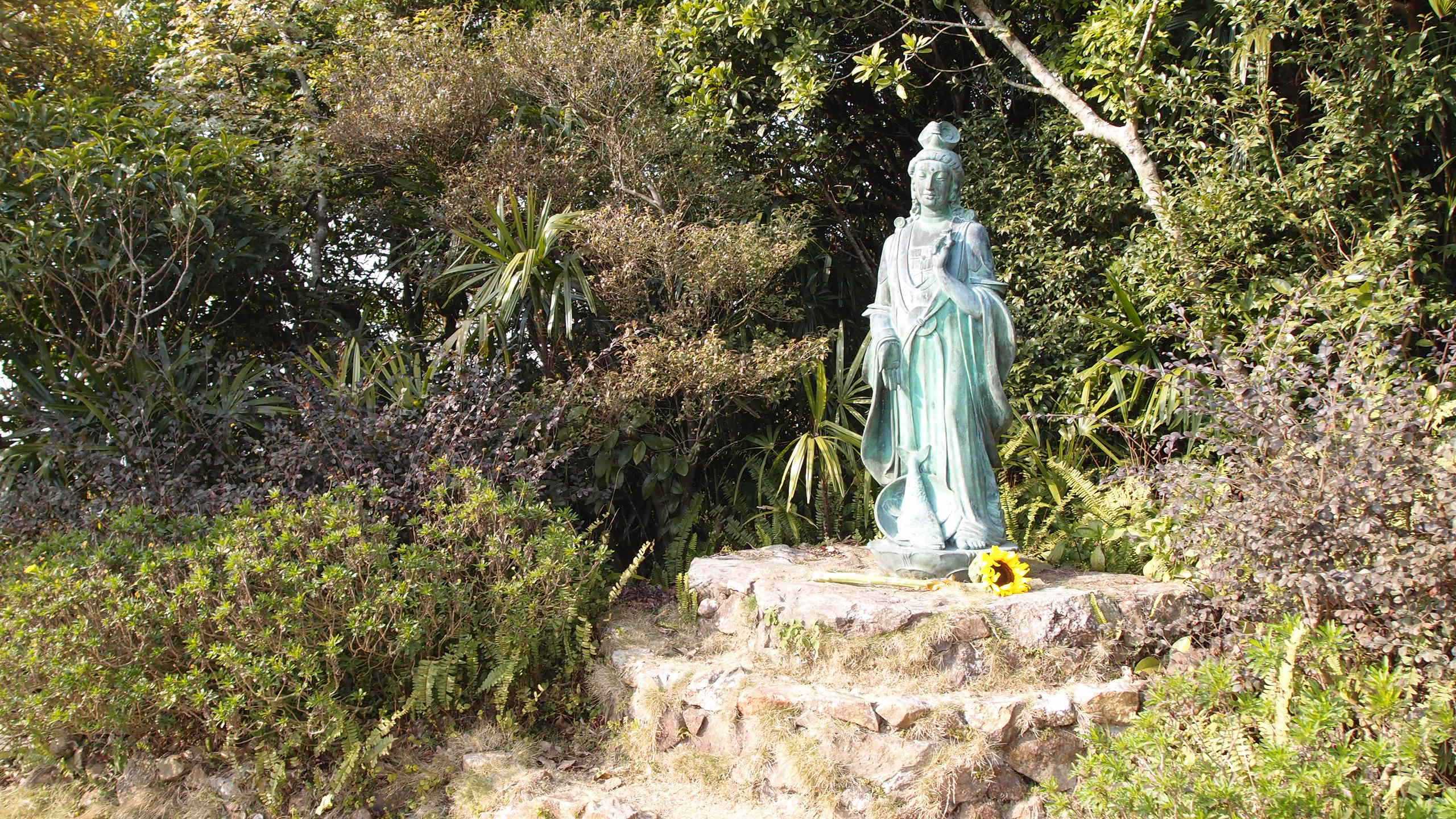
Statue of Kwun Yam (Boddhisattva Avalokiteśvara)

Its description in San-on County Gazetteer

Kwun Yam Shan (Chinese: 觀音山) is a mountain located in northern Hong Kong and its peak is in the Kadoorie Farm and Botanic Garden, at the border of Tai Po District and Yuen Long District, branching north from the highest mountain in Hong Kong, namely Tai Mo Shan. The mountain is named after Kwun Yam, a Chinese interpretation of Boddhisattva Avalokiteśvara. According to San-on County Gazetteer, there was a Kwun Yam Temple on its summit. It was mentioned in the county gazetteer because of its distinct shape, its sharp rise reaching the sky, and its religious nature to local.

== Sightseeing ==
Kadoorie Farm is an educational and local tourist hotspot for agriculture and natural conservation. The summit of the mountain is a tourist feature which is accessible by shuttle bus, apart from hiking. The entrance to the summit erects the Dragon and Phoenix Pillars and the location of the summit also erects a statue of Kwun Yam. The summit features a hole named Hot Pots which releasing warm misty air in the winter.

=== Hiking ===
Kwun Yam Shan is a popular destination for springtime cherry blossom viewing.

== Geography ==
Kwun Yam Shan is 546 metres (1,791 feet) in height, to the north of Tai Mo Shan, the tallest mountain in Hong Kong.

=== Geology ===
The rock of the mountain was mapped as granodiorite, but as in 2008 it was reclassified as altered intrusive rhyolitic hyaloclastite in Hong Kong Geological Survery. During Shing Mun Formation, it might be on a vent feeder of a volcano. The rock shows large quartz crystal with mineral veins of quartz, pyrite and galena.

== See also ==
- List of mountains, peaks and hills in Hong Kong
- Kwun Yam
