= To Yuen Tung =

Village in Hong Kong

Coordinates: 22.440988°N 114.163411°E

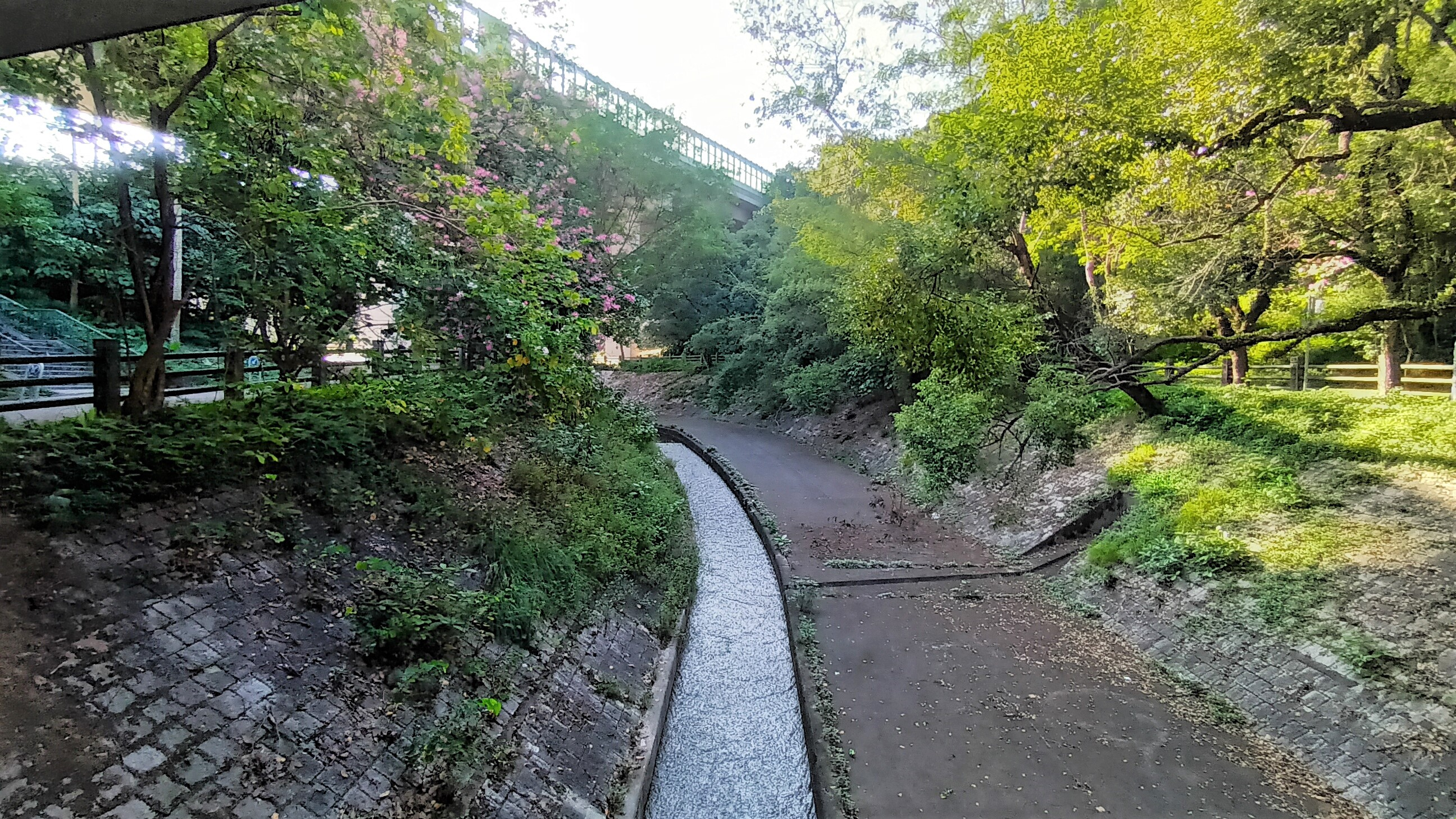
Tai Po River near Tolo Highway Bridge across Tat Won Road in the vicinity of To Yuen Tung.

To Yuen Tung (Chinese: 桃源洞) is a village in Tai Po District, Hong Kong.

== Administration ==
To Yuen Tung is a recognized village under the New Territories Small House Policy.
