= Tai Mo Shan Road =

Road in Hong Kong

Coordinates: 22.4102°N 114.1198°E

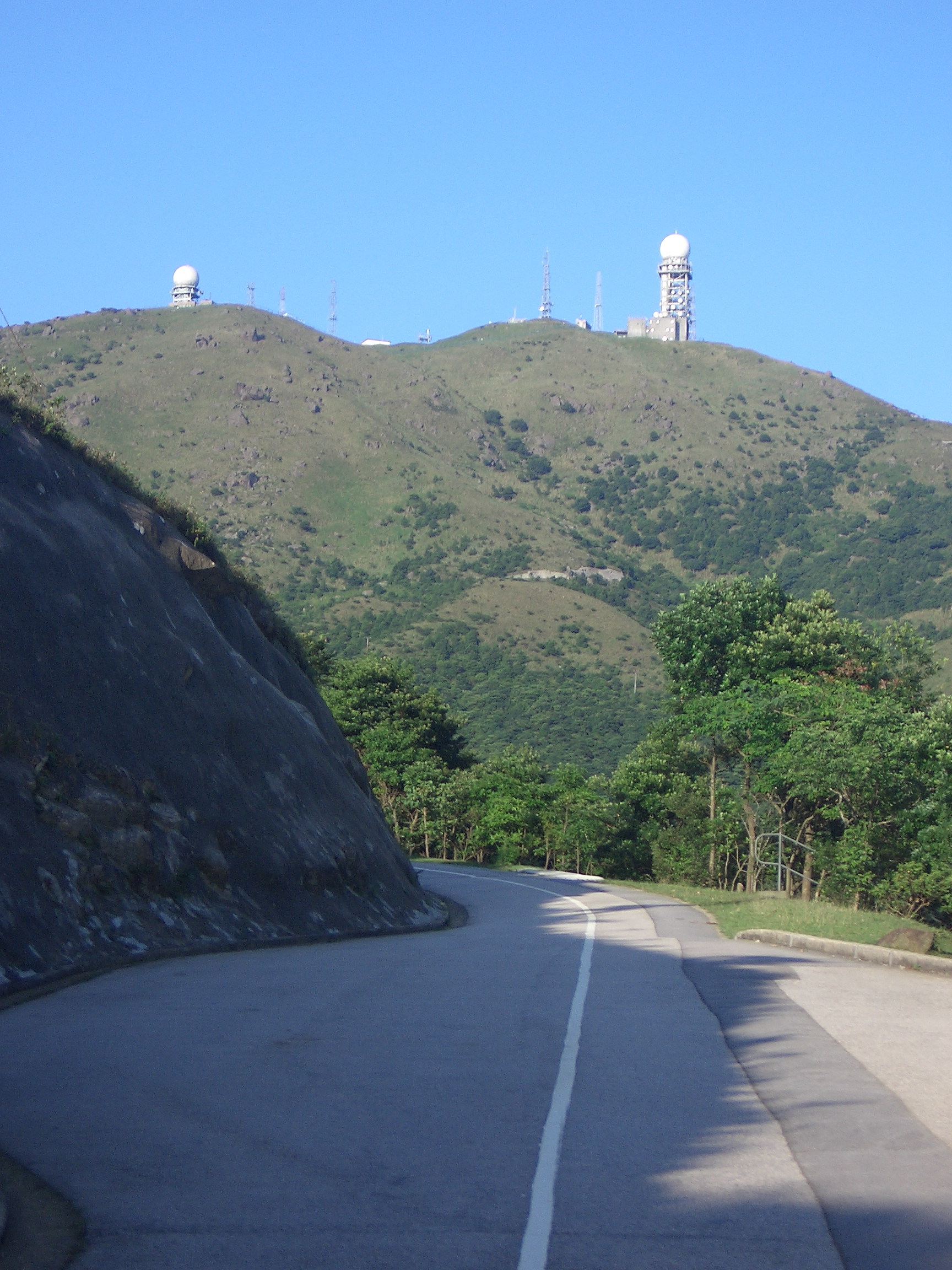
Tai Mo Shan Road (大帽山道), and Tai Mo Shan peak in distance

Tai Mo Shan Road (Chinese: 大帽山道; Jyutping: daai6 mou6 saan1 dou6; pinyin: Dàmàoshāndào) is a road in New Territories, Hong Kong. It originates from Route Twisk and leads to (but does not terminate at) the weather station at the top of Tai Mo Shan. Paved the whole way, the upper-most roughly 3 kilometres (1.9 mi) route is blocked by a staffed barrier gate, and is hence inaccessible to motor vehicles, except those on government or military service. A carpark exists at this point. Bicycles and pedestrians are permitted past this barrier, with cyclists not permitted to go beyond the boundaries of the paved road (i.e. past where the road ends or to the left/right of the road). There is an enclosed restricted area in which lies at 957 metres (3,140 ft), Hong Kong's highest point, a Doppler weather radar, and communications equipment.

Cows and oxen may be encountered along the length of the road. Several pull-off points exist along the road.

Until mid-2009, Stage 8 of the MacLehose Trail started at the road's intersection with Route Twisk, and ran along the entire section of Tai Mo Shan Road, and then continued towards Lead Mine Pass. The section of Stage 8 between Route Twisk and the car park now starts at the Kowloon Motor Bus stop on Route Twisk and is diverted to a nearby dirt track with steps so that hikers and motorists are segregated. However, the original route still forms part of the annual Oxfam Trailwalker to avoid confusion.

Though rarely, the road may be covered by ice just like on 24 January 2016 or during other extreme cold waves.

== See also ==
- List of streets and roads in Hong Kong

== Gallery ==
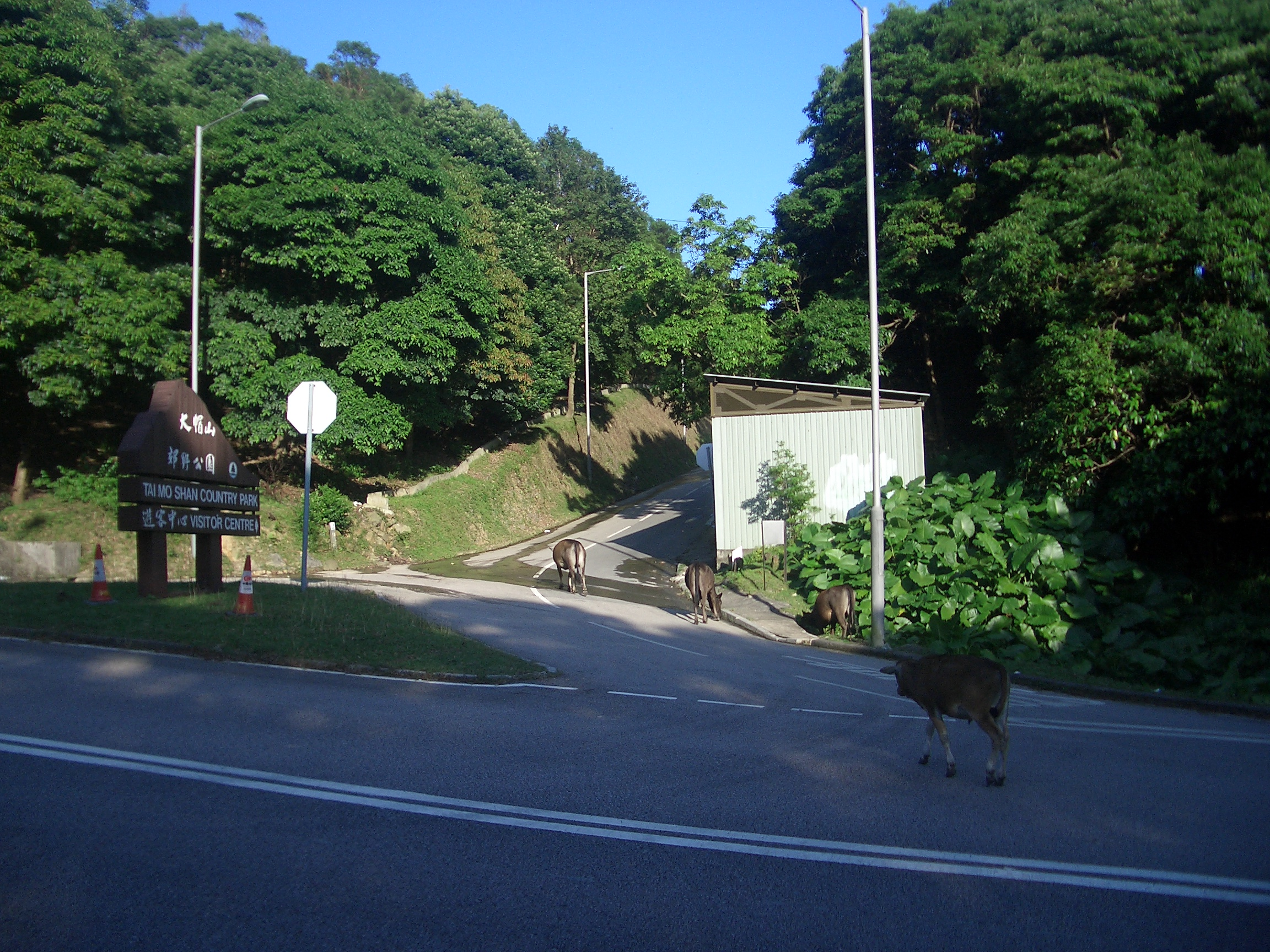
Tai Mo Shan Road turn-off on Route Twisk in August 2006

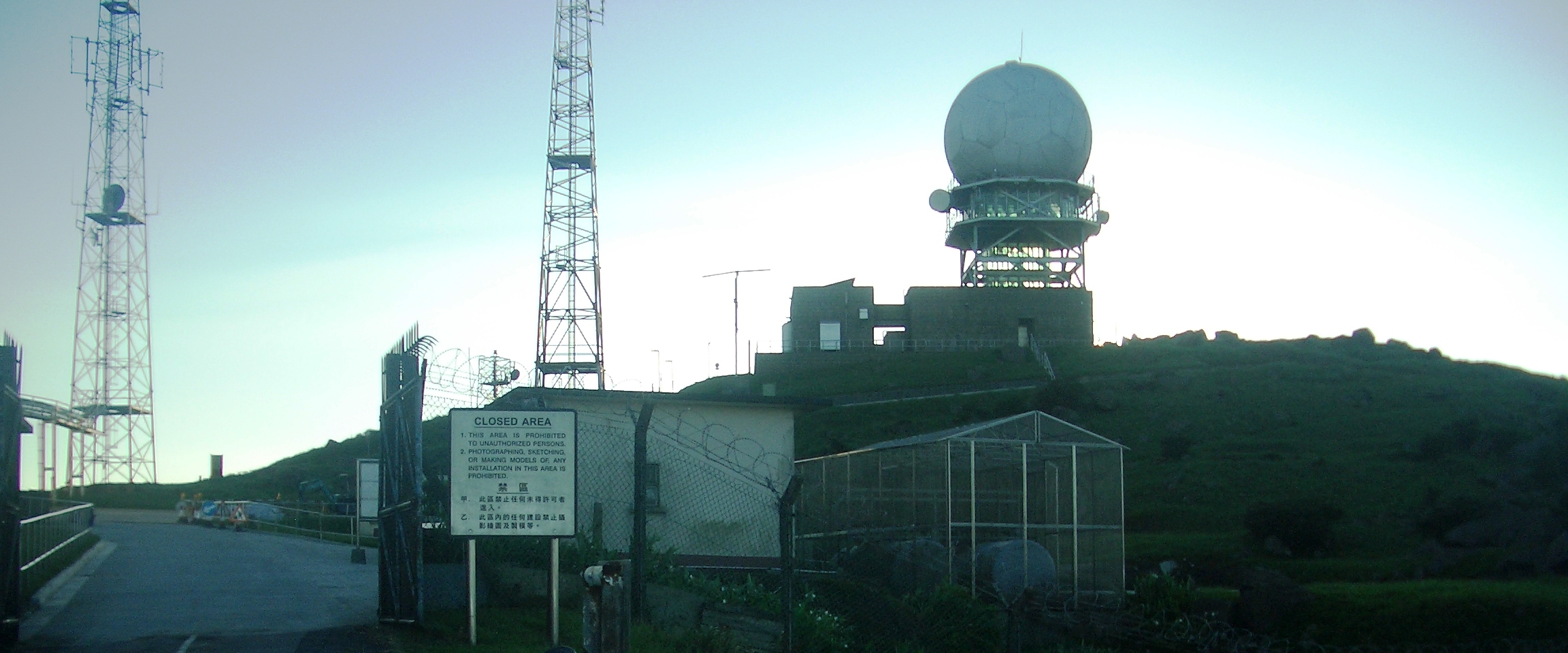
Entrance to Weather Station at top of Tai Mo Shan in August 2006

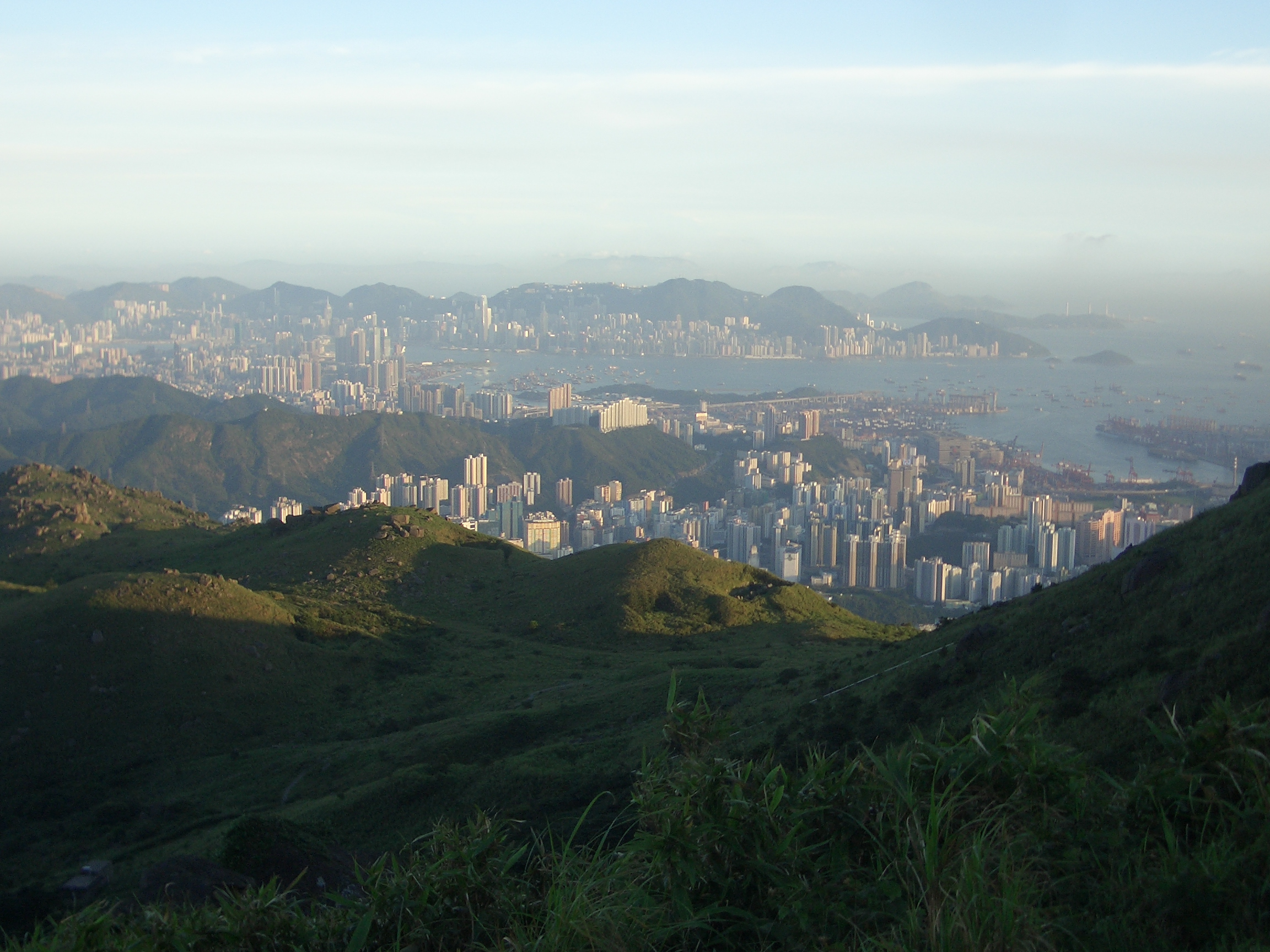
View of Hong Kong Island and Kowloon from Tai Mo Shan Road in August 2006

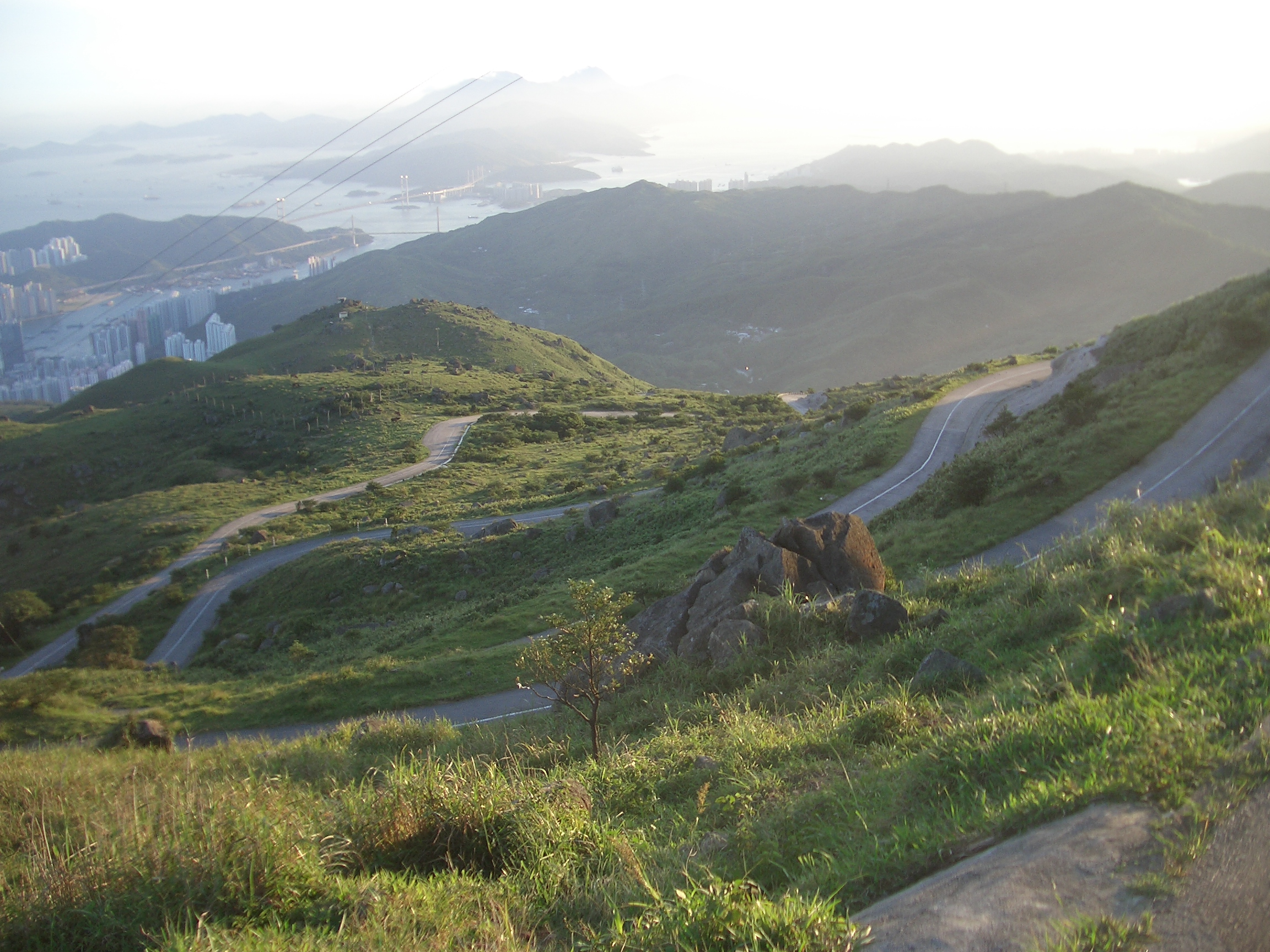
Tai Mo Shan Road weaving up Tai Mo Shan in August 2006
