= Shing Mun Valley =

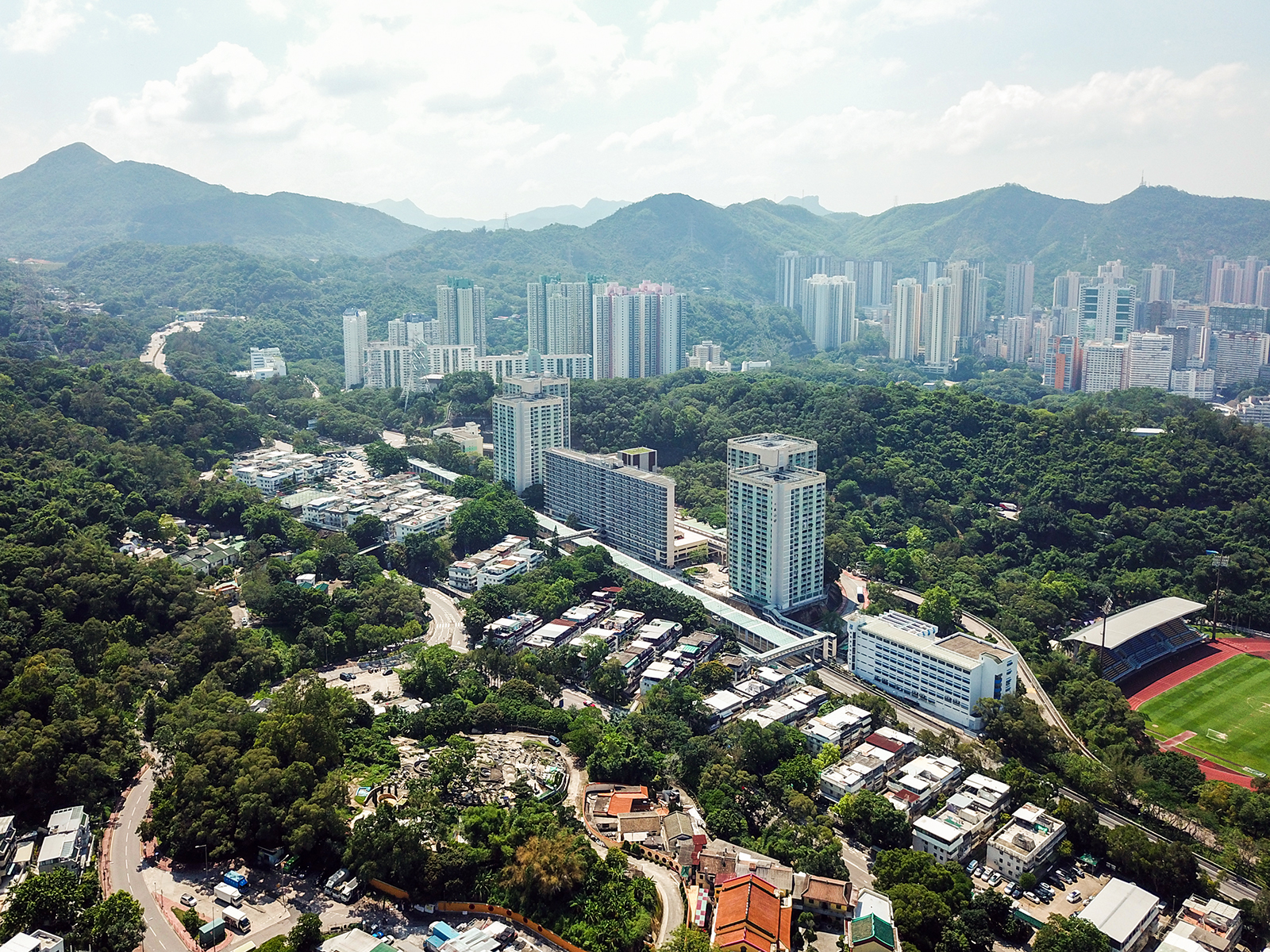
Shing Mun Valley

Shing Mun Valley (Chinese: 城門谷) is a valley in the Shing Mun area of Hong Kong.

== History ==
Before the construction of Shing Mun Reservoir, there were several villages near the valley. Some of these villages were later relocated near the Tsuen Wan entrance of Shing Mun Tunnels.

Shing Mun San Tsuen in Kam Tin, Yuen Long District, was built by the government and completed in 1930, to accommodate some of the families moved away from the Shing Mun Valley in the late 1920s for the construction of the Shing Mun Reservoir.

== See also ==
- Shing Mun Valley Sports Ground
- Lei Muk Shue
- Wo Yi Hop
