= Pan Chung =

Walled village in Hong Kong

Pan Chung Chinese: 泮涌
- Village
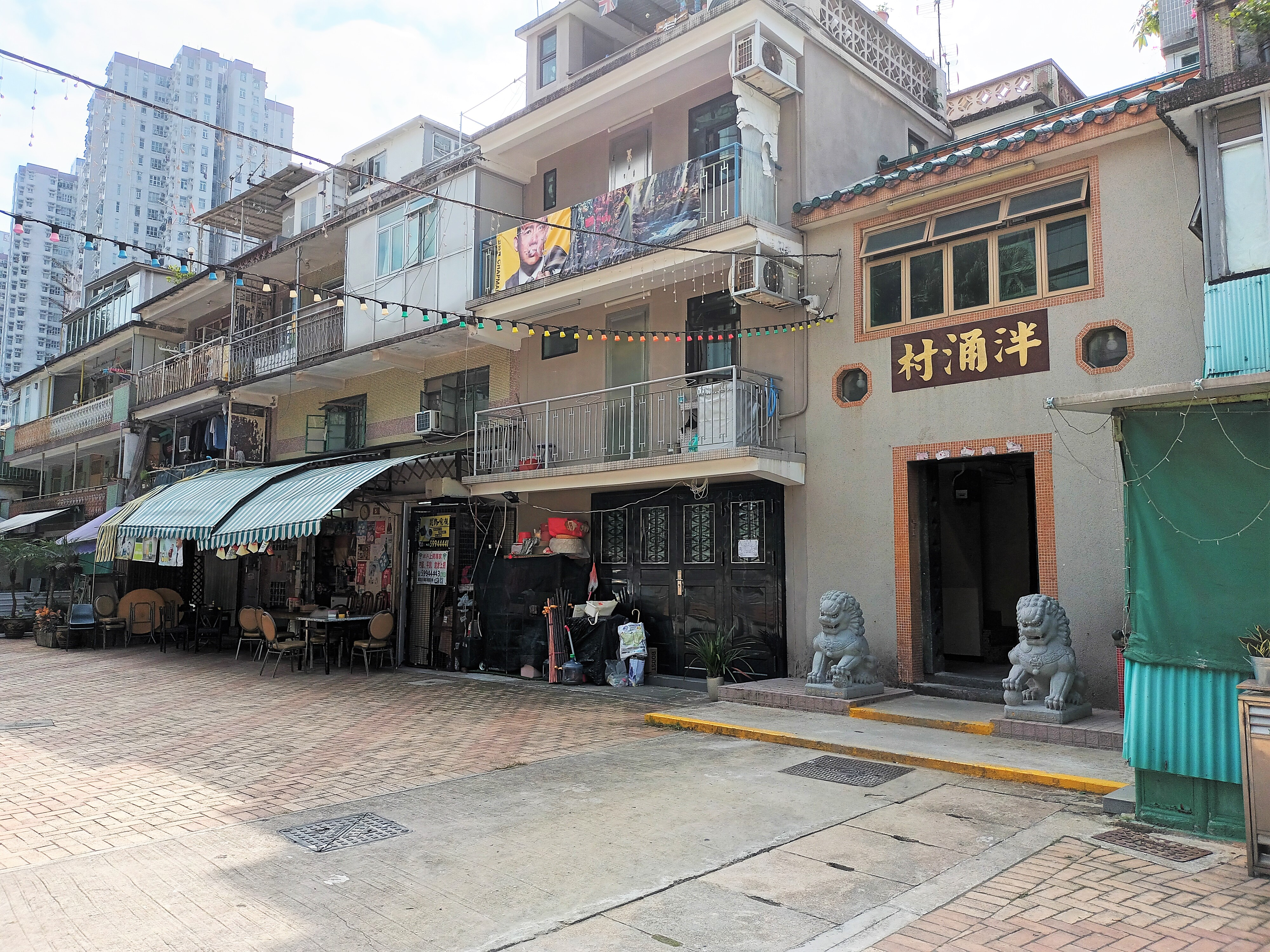
- Entrance gate of Pan Chung.

- Location within Hong Kong
- Coordinates: 22.445308°N 114.165748°E
- Country: People's Republic of China
- Special administrative region: Hong Kong
- District: Tai Po District
- Time zone: UTC+8:00 (HKT)

Pan Chung (Chinese: 泮涌) is a walled village in Tai Po District, Hong Kong.

== Administration ==
Pan Chung and neighboring Pan Chung San Tsuen (泮涌新村; 'Pan Chung New Village') are recognized villages under the New Territories Small House Policy.

It is one of the villages represented within the Tai Po Rural Committee. For electoral purposes, Pan Chung is part of the San Fu constituency, which was formerly represented by Max Wu Yiu-cheong until May 2021.

== Gallery ==
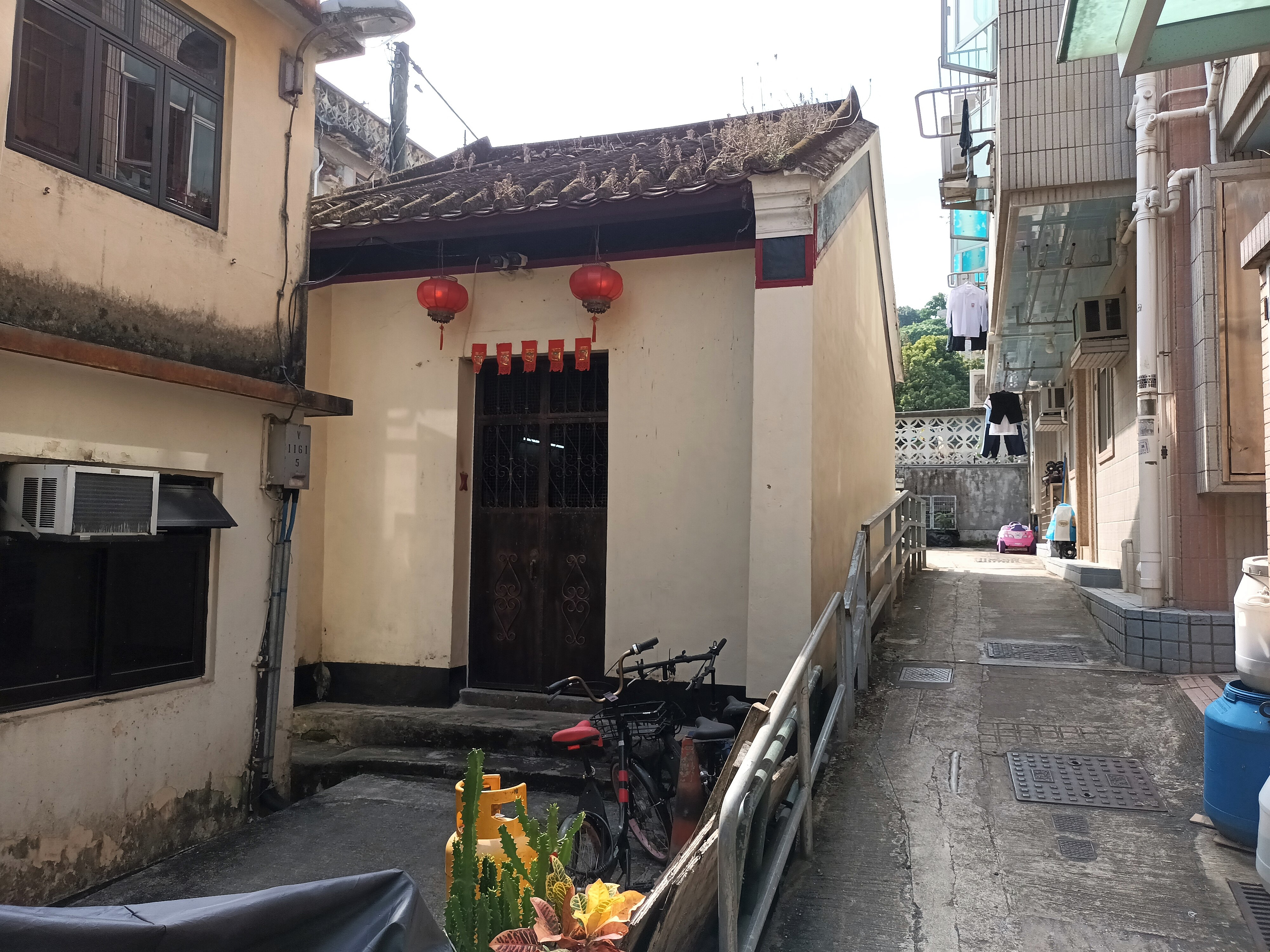
Village shrine of Pan Chung.

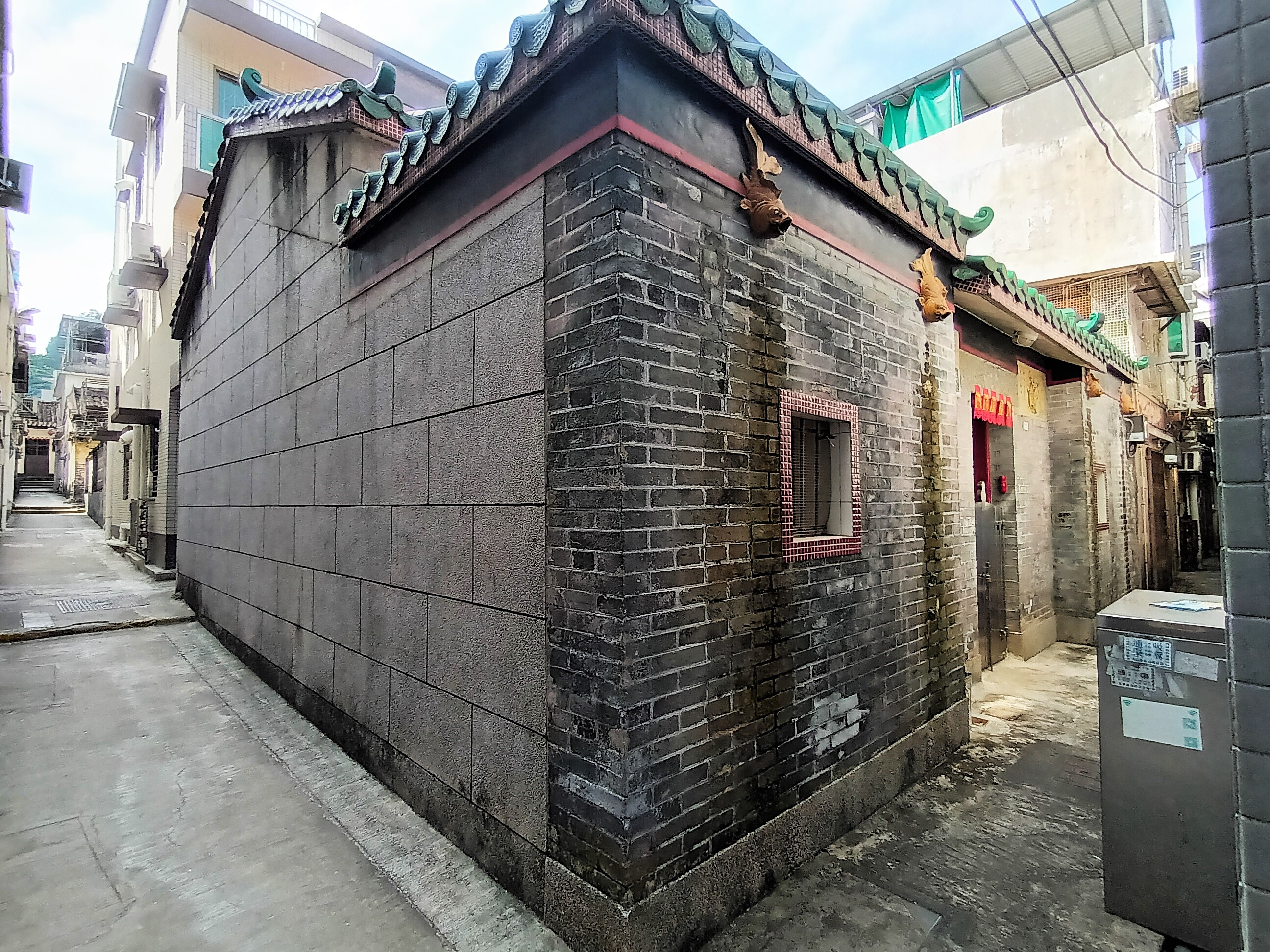
Mak Ancestral Hall in Pan Chung.

== See also ==
- Walled villages of Hong Kong
- Ha Keng Hau
- Ma Wo
