= Kam Tin Shing Mun San Tsuen =

Village of Hong Kong

Coordinates: 22.440673°N 114.066458°E

- Traditional Chinese: 錦田城門新村
- Simplified Chinese: 锦田城门新村
Transcriptions
Standard Mandarin
- Hanyu Pinyin: Jǐn Tián Chéngmén Xīncūn
Yue: Cantonese
- Jyutping: gam2 tin4 sing4 mun4 san1 cyun1

Kam Tin San Tsuen
- Traditional Chinese: 錦田新村
- Simplified Chinese: 锦田新村
Transcriptions
Standard Mandarin
- Hanyu Pinyin: Jǐn Tián Xīncūn
Yue: Cantonese
- Jyutping: gam2 tin4 san1 cyun1

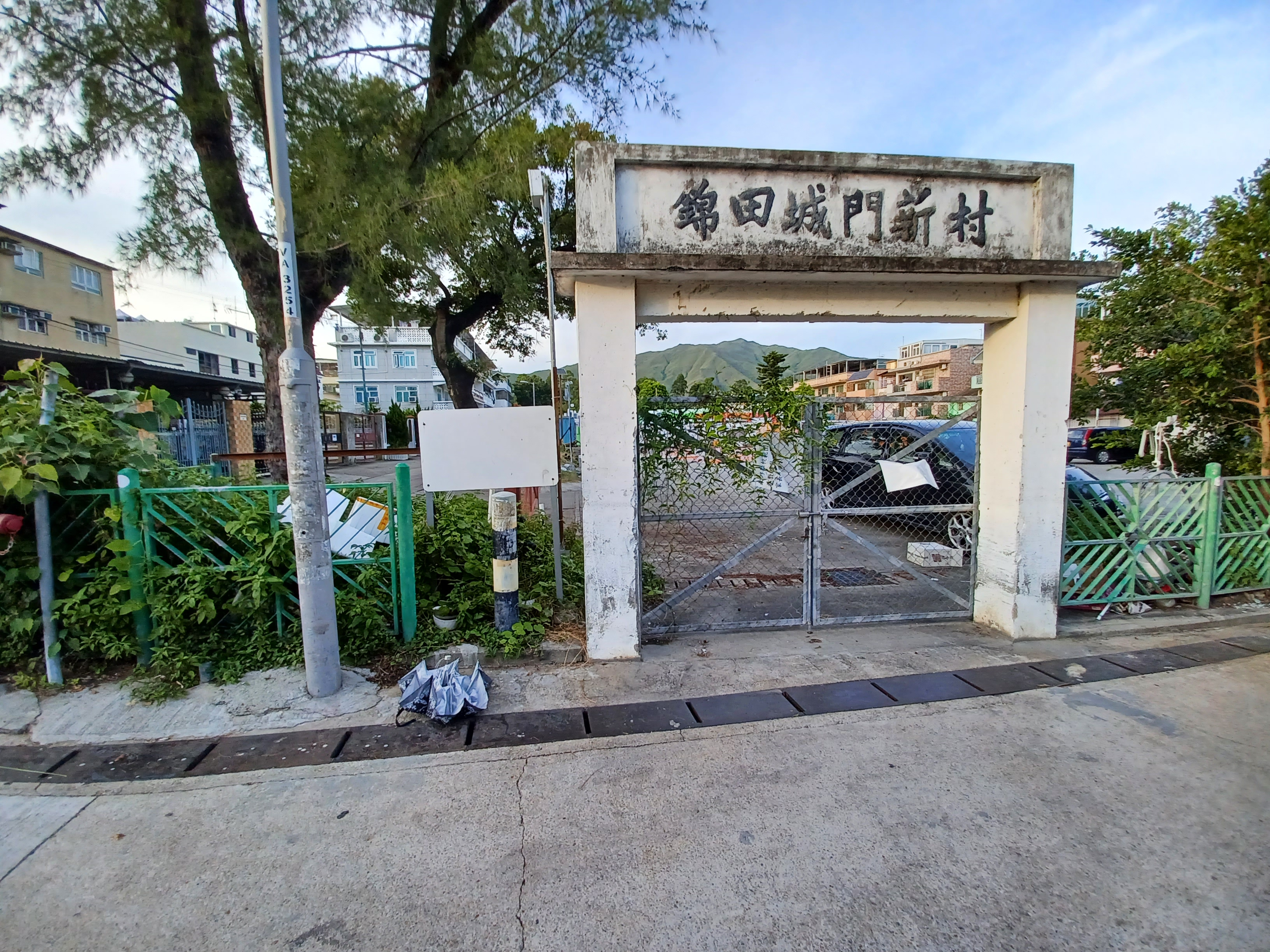
Kam Tin Shing Mun San Tsuen archway.

Kam Tin Shing Mun San Tsuen (Chinese: 錦田城門新村) or Kam Tin San Tsuen (錦田新村) is a village in the Kam Tin area of Yuen Long District, Hong Kong.

== Administration ==
Kam Tin San Tsuen is a recognized village under the New Territories Small House Policy.

== History ==
Kam Tin Shing Mun San Tsuen was populated by inhabitants of Shing Mun Valley villages, who were displaced for the construction of the Shing Mun Reservoir in the late 1920s.

== Features ==
A Hip Tin temple is located within Kam Tin Shing Mun San Tsuen. The temple is owned by the Cheng clan. It was probably built around 1920. It was relocated from Shing Mun Valley in the 1920s due to the construction of the Shing Mun Reservoir and the resulting resettlement of Shing Mun San Tsuen.
