= Tsuen Kam Interchange =

Road interchange in Hong Kong

荃錦交匯處
- Tsuen Kam Interchange
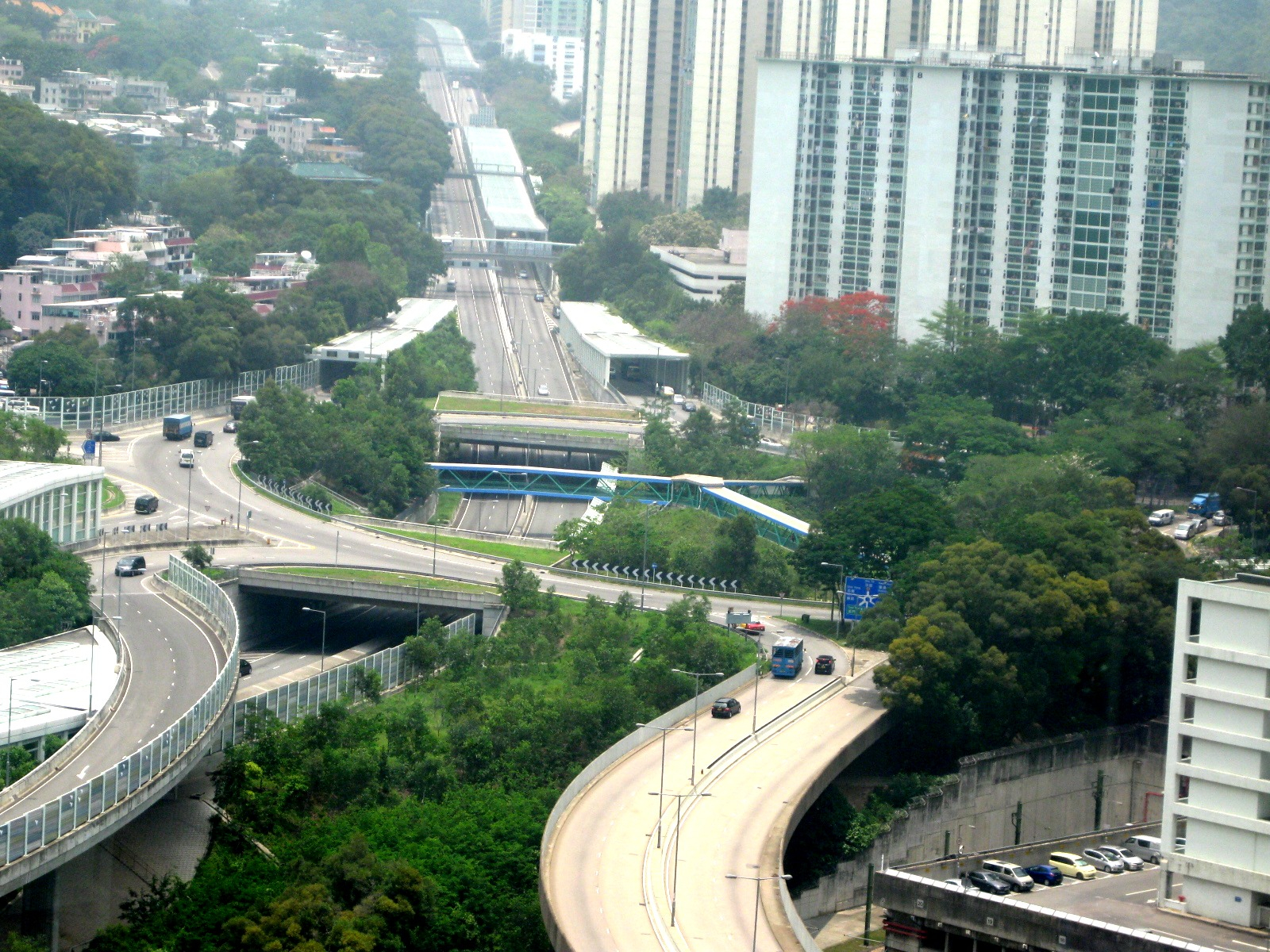
- The Tsuen Kam Interchange, with Cheung Pei Shan Road passing underneath it.
- Interactive map of 荃錦交匯處

Location
- Tsuen Wan District, New Territories, Hong Kong
- Coordinates: 22.37533°N 114.12061°E
- Roads at junction: Route 9 (Cheung Pei Shan Road); Route Twisk; Texaco Road; Wai Tsuen Road; Tai Ho Road

Construction
- Type: Roundabout interchange
- Lanes: 3
- Opened: November 4, 1983

The Tsuen Kam Interchange (Chinese: 荃錦交匯處) is a traffic interchange located in the Tsuen Wan District of the New Territories, Hong Kong. The Tsuen Kam Interchange is a clockwise roundabout with three lanes, measuring a total length of 450 meters. It has six exits that provide access to various areas including Sha Tin, Kwai Chung, Kowloon, Tsuen Wan, Tuen Mun, Kam Tin, and Shek Kong. The entire Tsuen Kam Interchange is designated as a route for New Territories taxis.

== History ==
As part of the Tsuen Wan New Town Comprehensive Development Plan, Texaco Road was extended to the Tsuen Kam Interchange at 11:00 AM on March 31, 1981. At the same time, to accommodate the MTR Tsuen Wan Line project, a section of Tsuen Kam Road, from its intersection with Castle Peak Road to the vicinity of Shek Wai Kok Estate, was closed to traffic at 11:00 AM on April 1, 1981. Southbound traffic on Tsuen Kam Road was thus diverted through the Tsuen Kam Interchange. The Tsuen Kam Interchange was officially named on November 4, 1983.

== Route and connecting roads ==
The Tsuen Kam Interchange is a clockwise rotary, with 3 traffic lanes and a total length of 450 meters. The Cheung Pei Shan Road, part of Hong Kong's Route 9, passes underneath it. The interchange has 6 exits, connecting Cheung Pei Shan Road, Tsuen Kam Road, North Tsing Shek Road, Wai Tsuen Road, and North Tai Ho Road, providing access to Sha Tin, Kwai Chung, Kowloon, Tsuen Wan, Tuen Mun, Kam Tin, and Shek Kong. The entire Tsuen Kam Interchange is part of the designated taxi routes in the New Territories.

== Pedestrian facilities ==
The Tsuen Kam Interchange has 3 pedestrian tunnels, allowing pedestrians from areas such as Luk Yeung Sun Chuen, Shek Wai Kok Estate, Hoi Pa Village South Platform, and Ma Sim Pai Road to cross the interchange. The three pedestrian tunnels are interconnected with pedestrian bridges.

== Traffic blackspots ==
The entrance and exit of Cheung Pei Shan Road at the Tsuen Kam Interchange, along with the exit of North Tsing Shek Road, are defined as traffic black spots by the Hong Kong Transport Department. Drivers at the Tsuen Kam Interchange often fail to yield the right of way, and some even disregard safety by cutting lanes carelessly, resulting in frequent traffic accidents. For example, in 2010, 18 traffic accidents occurred at the Tsuen Kam Interchange.

== See also ==
- Accident blackspot
- Route Twisk
- Cheung Pei Shan Road
- Texaco Road
