= Cheung Pei Shan Road =

Road in Hong Kong

Coordinates: 22.37554°N 114.12068°E

Cheung Pei Shan Road
- Part of Route 9
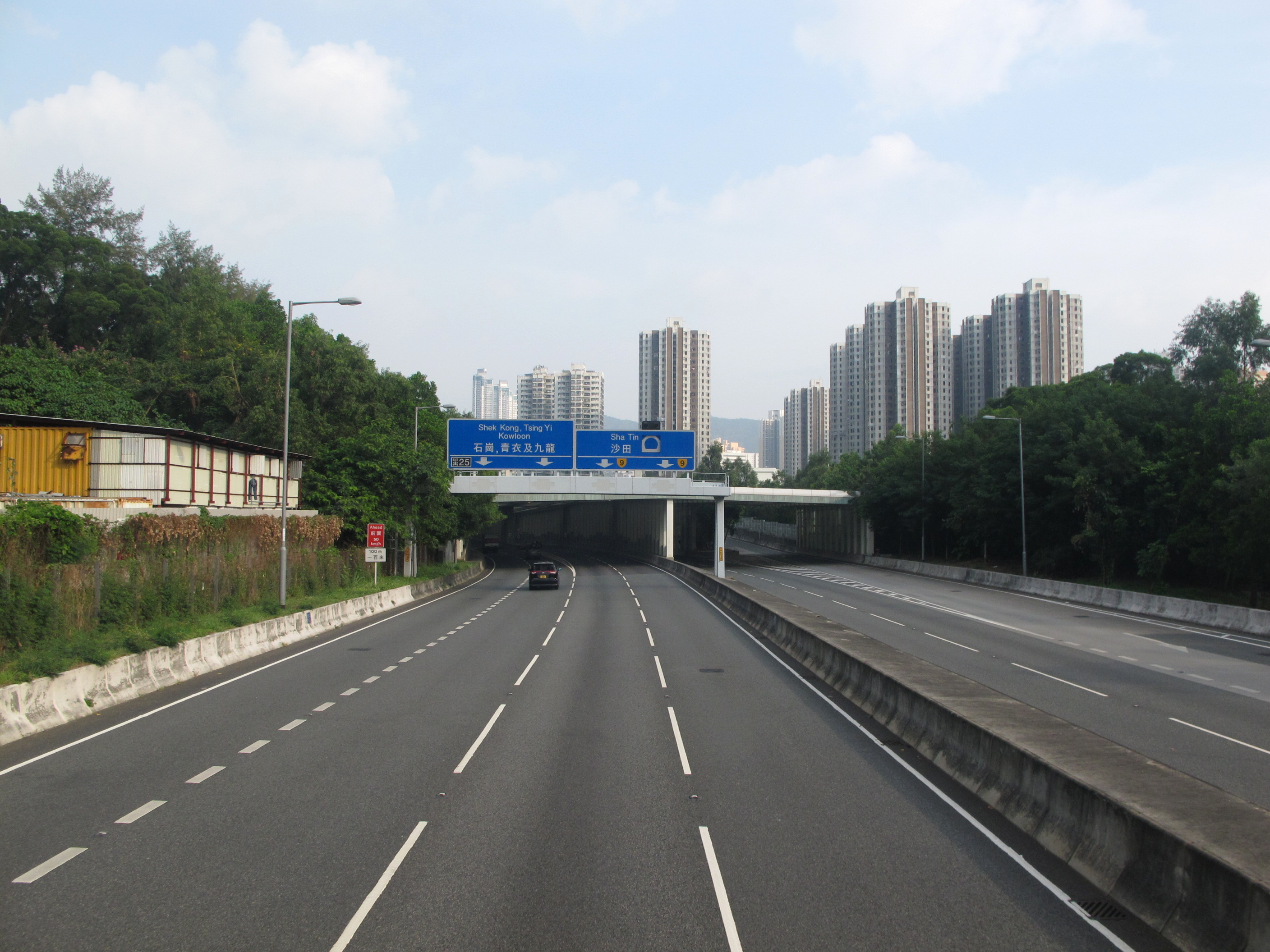

Route information
- Maintained by Highways Department
- Length: 2.9 km (1.8 mi)
- Existed: 1980–present

Major junctions
- West end: Tsuen Wan (near Chai Wan Kok)
- 3
- East end: Shing Mun (near Wo Yi Hop)

Location
- Country: China
- Special administrative region: Hong Kong

Highway system
- Transport in Hong Kong; Routes; Roads and Streets

Cheung Pei Shan Road (Chinese: 象鼻山路) is a road near Cheung Pei Shan in Tsuen Wan and Sheung Kwai Chung of Hong Kong. It links the north edge of town centre of Tsuen Wan New Town to Shing Mun, from Tsuen Kam Interchange with Route Twisk, Tai Ho Road North, Wai Tsuen Road and Texaco Road North to the entrance of the Shing Mun Tunnels. The road is part of Route 9. North of the road are resited villages from the old town of Tsuen Wan and Cheung Pei Shan; to its south are public housing estates: Lei Muk Shue Estate, Cheung Shan Estate and Shek Wai Kok Estate.

== History ==
Cheung Pei Shan Road was opened in July 1980 to provide access to Cheung Shan Estate and Shek Wai Kok Estate. At that time, the road was directly connected to Wo Yi Hop Road at its east end. In 1990, the Shing Mun Tunnels were completed, and the east end of Cheung Pei Shan Road was realigned to connect directly to the west entrance of the tunnels. Connection to Wo Yi Hop Road was cut.

In September 2001, construction was started on an extension of Cheung Pei Shan Road from Tsuen Kam Interchange to the Tsuen Wan end of Tuen Mun Road. This extension was opened on 8 February 2007, closing the gap of the New Territories Circular Road.

== Interchanges ==
Cheung Pei Shan Road
Westbound exits	Exit number	Eastbound exits
continues as Tuen Mun Road
End Cheung Pei Shan Road		Start Cheung Pei Shan Road
no exit	24C	Tsuen Wan; Castle Peak Road - Tsuen Wan
TSUEN KAM INTERCHANGE; Kam Tin, Tsuen Wan; Route Twisk, Texaco Road North, Wai Tsuen Road, Tai Ho Road North	25	TSUEN KAM INTERCHANGE; Kam Tin, Tsuen Wan; Route Twisk, Texaco Road North, Wai Tsuen Road, Tai Ho Road North
WO YI HOP INTERCHANGE; Shing Mun, Kwai Chung; Wo Yi Hop Road, Sam Tung Uk Road	25A	no exit
Start Cheung Pei Shan Road		End Cheung Pei Shan Road continues on as Shing Mun Tunnels

== See also ==
- List of streets and roads in Hong Kong
- Route 9 (Hong Kong)

Preceded by Tuen Mun Road	Hong Kong Route 9 Cheung Pei Shan Road	Succeeded by Shing Mun Tunnels
