= Route Twisk =

Road in New Territories, Hong Kong

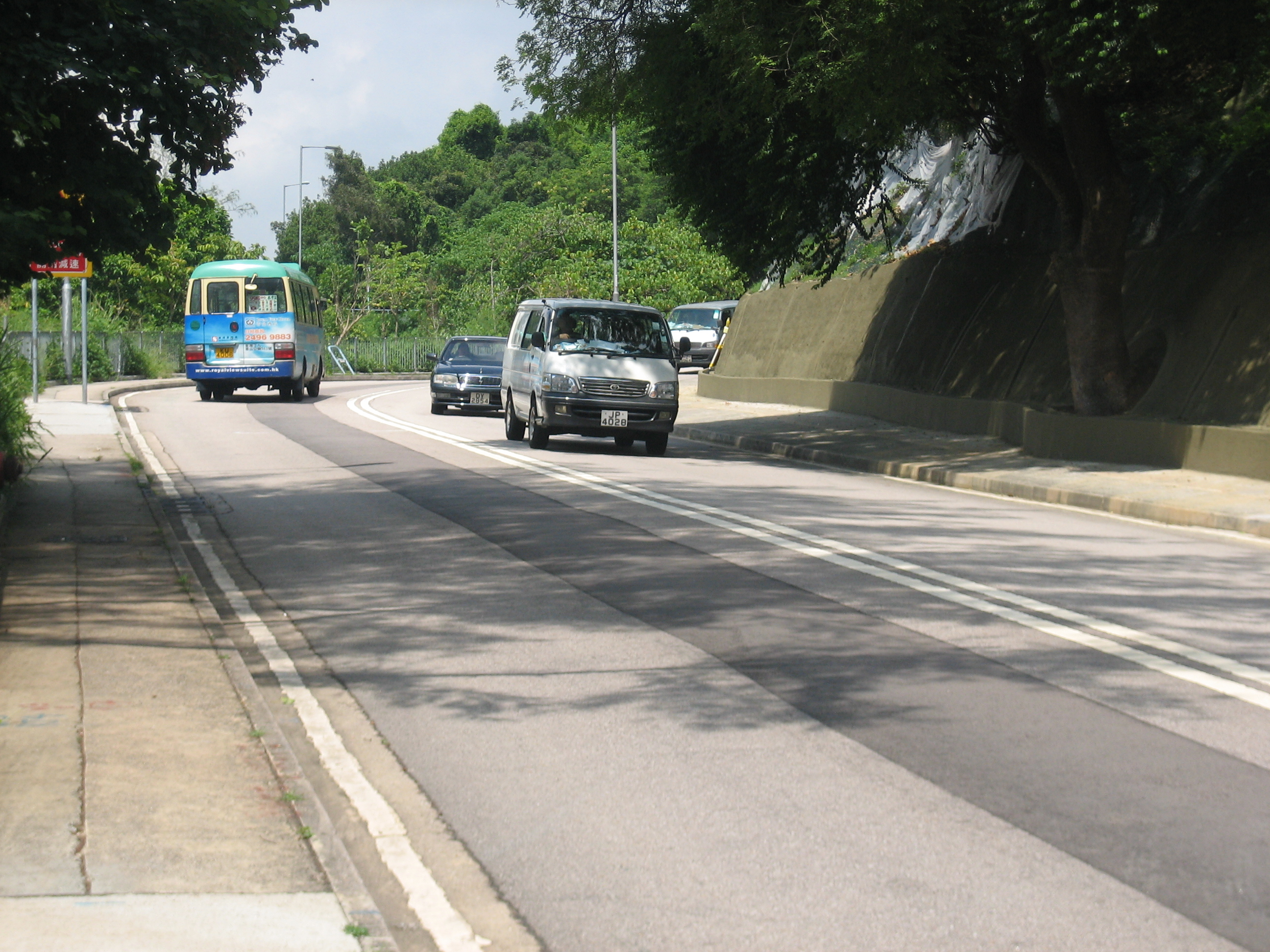
- A section of Route Twisk
- Interactive map of Route Twisk
- Native name: 荃錦公路 (Chinese)
- Former name: Construction began October 1950; opened to traffic 29 June 1953
- Length: 11.5 km (7.1 mi)
- Restrictions: 50 km/h (speed limit); two lanes, two-way
- Location: Tsuen Wan District, Yuen Long District
- South end: Tsuen Kam Interchange at Shek Wai Kok, Tsuen Wan
- Major junctions: Tai Mo Shan Road
- North end: Junction with Kam Tin Road / Lam Kam Road at Shek Kong

Construction
- Inauguration: Late 1940s 25 November 1977 (naming date)
- This map shows that Route Twisk is quite winding and rugged

Route Twisk
- Traditional Chinese: 荃錦公路
- Simplified Chinese: 荃锦公路
Transcriptions
Standard Mandarin
- Hanyu Pinyin: Quánjǐn gōnglù
Yue: Cantonese
- Yale Romanization: chyun4 gam2 gung1 lou6
- Jyutping: cyun4 gam2 gung1 lou6

Route Twisk (Chinese: 荃錦公路; Jyutping: cyun4 gam2 gung1 lou6) is a north–south road in the New Territories of Hong Kong, running between Tsuen Wan in Tsuen Wan District and Shek Kong in Yuen Long District. The road is 11.5 kilometres long. Its northern end joins Kam Tin Road and Lam Kam Road, while its southern end meets Cheung Pei Shan Road, Tai Ho Road North and Texaco Road at the Tsuen Kam Interchange. Along the way it crosses sparsely populated areas including Twisk Pass, Shek Kong Barracks and Tai Mo Shan Country Park. Route Twisk is well known for being narrow and winding, and traffic volumes there have always been comparatively low, but since its completion it has become the most direct road between Shek Kong and Tsuen Wan. At present, apart from vehicles holding a permit to use the road, vehicles exceeding 10 metres in total length may not enter Route Twisk; New Territories taxis may travel along the entire length of Route Twisk, but passengers may only be picked up or set down within Tai Mo Shan Country Park and the sections north of it; picking up or setting down passengers is not permitted on sections to the south.

== History ==
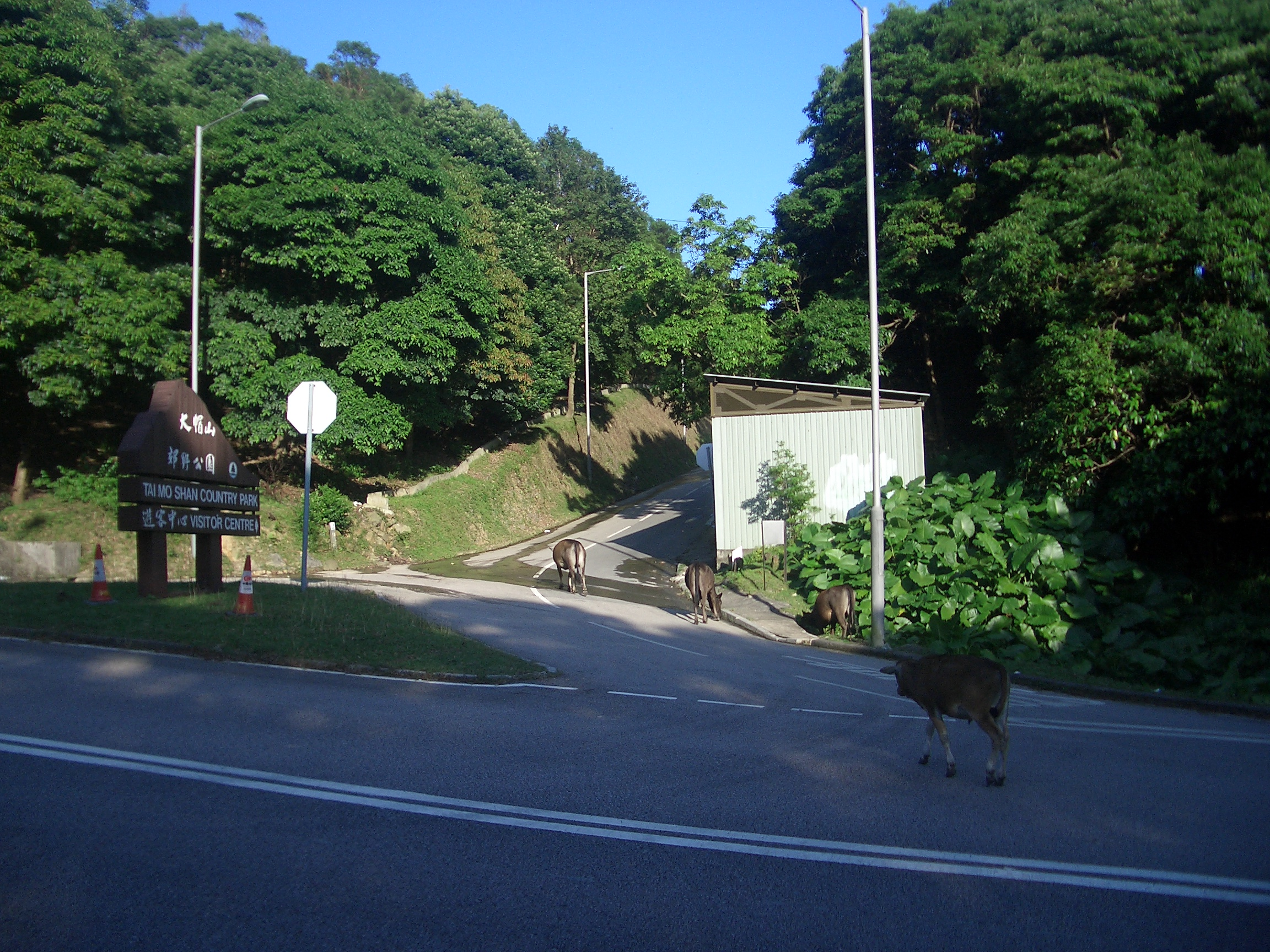
The junction of Route Twisk with Tai Mo Shan Road.

Plans for a road connecting Tsuen Wan and Yuen Long first appeared in the 1940s, originally as supporting infrastructure for a proposed new airport at Ping Shan. That plan later fell through after the establishment of the PRC, owing to concerns that aircraft taking off and landing would have to enter Chinese Communist airspace, and construction of the road was cancelled as a result. Later, in 1950, the British Hong Kong garrison, seeking to facilitate the movement of military vehicles and supplies into and out of the New Territories and to carry out defensive works, brought in the Royal Engineers, who had also built roads in Kenya and the Malay Peninsula, to carry out the military construction works in Hong Kong, building a road along the foothills between Tsuen Wan and Kam Tin. The officer commanding the works at the time was Brigadier H. P. Cavendish. Route TW/SK, as it was originally and long formally identified (for Tsuen Wan – Sek Kong), was, at that time, one of the few concrete roads built using mechanised construction methods rather than manual labour, which became a noted feature of the road. The road cost around HK$6 million to build at the time. The British military subsequently began building Shek Kong Barracks along Route Twisk from September 1951.

On 29 June 1953, Route TW/SK officially opened to traffic, already widely known as 'Route Twisk' (the official designation also evolved, to Route TWSK). Initially, only military and emergency vehicles were permitted to use the entire road, while other vehicles could travel only on the section south of Chuen Lung. The authorities also regularly dispatched the British Hong Kong garrison to prevent unauthorised civilian vehicles from travelling on the relevant sections. In 1955, the Hong Kong Government began negotiating with the British Hong Kong garrison over opening Route Twisk to civilian vehicles. After several rounds of discussion, the military agreed to hand it over to the Hong Kong Government for management, and the road was opened to the public on 25 May 1961. However, the road was formally named 'Route Twisk' only in November 1977. After Route Twisk opened as a public road, Kowloon Motor Bus decided to trial the first-generation Route 26 (Note: Now Route 51, running between Tsuen Wan (Nina Tower) and Sheung Tsuen.) via Route Twisk, running between Jordan Road Ferry Pier and Yuen Long town centre, which was faster than the first-generation Route 16 via Castle Peak Road.

Route Twisk's Tsuen Wan terminus was originally on Castle Peak Road – Tsuen Wan Section, near Sai Lau Kok Road at the Tsuen Kam Centre. However, because the Hong Kong Mass Transit Railway (now the MTR) built the Tsuen Wan line and its depot, the section of Route Twisk from the Route Twisk Interchange to Castle Peak Road was closed to traffic from 1 April 1981. A short section at its original junction with Castle Peak Road was retained only for access to Mei Wan Street and was incorporated into Sai Lau Kok Road, and Route Twisk's terminus was shortened to the Route Twisk Interchange, as it remains today.

== English name ==
The English name "Route Twisk" differs from the usual transliteration, such as "Tsuen Kam Road", used for Hong Kong roads, as a legacy of its military designation 'Route TW/SK', which became 'Route TWSK' by at least the mid-1950s The formal 'Route TWSK' was still used in media reports until only months before the official gazetting of the name 'Route Twisk' on 25 November 1977. According to the official explanation given in the Hong Kong Yearbook, the authorities inserted an "i" between the abbreviations for Tsuen Wan (TW) and Shek Kong (SK), which the road connects, so that the name could be read as a word in English. Others suggest that the slash in "TW/SK" was mistaken for the letter I, resulting in "Route Twisk". while another article proposes that the "i" in Twisk stands for "interlink".

== Route ==
Route Twisk is a road roughly 11.5 kilometres long, running north–south. The road begins at the Route Twisk Interchange at Shek Wai Kok, Tsuen Wan, and climbs past The Cairnhill, The Cliveden, Tso Kung Tam and Chuen Lung before reaching the Tai Mo Shan Country Park forestry station at an elevation of 490 metres. It then descends past Shek Kong Barracks and Lui Kung Tin Tsuen, ending at the junction of Lam Kam Road and Kam Tin Road.

=== Junctions ===
The road currently falls within two administrative districts, Tsuen Wan District and Yuen Long District, with the boundary between them formed by Tai Mo Shan Road and the MacLehose Trail. Unnamed minor roads are not included in the following list of junctions.

Distance (km)	Destination	Notes
0.0	Route Twisk Interchange: Route 9 to Cheung Pei Shan Road, to Texaco Road North, to Tai Ho Road North, to Wai Tsuen Road	Roundabout. Route 9 direction A (clockwise) to Castle Peak Road – Tsuen Wan Section and Tuen Mun Road; direction B (counter-clockwise) to Shing Mun Tunnels.
0.028	Ma Sim Pai Road	
0.3	Fu Yung Shan Road	
6.2	Tai Mo Shan Road	Boundary between Tsuen Wan District and Yuen Long District; the district south of the road is Tsuen Wan District, and north of it is Yuen Long District.
9.8	Berwick Road, Butts Road, Wiltshire Road	Each of these access roads is within Shek Kong Barracks; entry is prohibited without authorisation and offenders may be prosecuted.
10.7	Northumberland Road	Each of these access roads is within Shek Kong Barracks; entry is prohibited without authorisation and offenders may be prosecuted.
11.1	Warwick Road	Each of these access roads is within Shek Kong Barracks; entry is prohibited without authorisation and offenders may be prosecuted.
11.2	Shropshire Road	Each of these access roads is within Shek Kong Barracks; entry is prohibited without authorisation and offenders may be prosecuted.
11.3	Middlesex Road	Each of these access roads is within Shek Kong Barracks; entry is prohibited without authorisation and offenders may be prosecuted.
11.4	Staffordshire Road	Each of these access roads is within Shek Kong Barracks; entry is prohibited without authorisation and offenders may be prosecuted.
11.5	Kam Tin Road, Lam Kam Road	Roundabout

== Current status ==
=== Annual average daily traffic ===
The following is annual average daily traffic (AADT) data for various sections of Route Twisk in 2021; the entire road is classified by the Transport Department as a "Rural Road" (RR).

Section	AADT (vehicles)	Estimated
From the Route Twisk Interchange to Chuen Lung	6,960	No
From Chuen Lung to Lam Kam Road	5,970	Yes

=== Vehicle restrictions ===
Because of the condition of Route Twisk's road surface, the Transport Department requires that all vehicles using the road be no more than 10 metres long. According to Lee Kok-wah, chairman of the Kowloon Motor Bus Staff Rights Union, KMB previously specially modified a batch of MCW Metrobus and Dennis Dart buses to travel up the mountain on Route 51. After that batch of vehicles was retired, the current Enviro 200 Dart single-deck buses were specially ordered to take over the route; these buses must be fitted with a manual retarder, fog lamps and increased horsepower to cope with the demanding driving conditions, but Route 51 experiences crowds of waiting passengers on Saturdays, Sundays and public holidays, and the vehicle length restriction also prevents some coaches carrying tourists to Tai Mo Shan from using the road. Such vehicles must hold a permit before entering the road to reach Tai Mo Shan, and some coach drivers have been prosecuted for entering without applying for a permit, which has often caused dissatisfaction within the transport industry. From 29 December 2017, the Transport Department allowed buses of any length to enter the section of Route Twisk south of Tai Mo Shan Road without needing a permit. In November 2021, KMB, coordinated by former Tsuen Wan District Councillor Chiu Yan-loy, sent an 11.3-metre Enviro500 MMC to trial the route. On 18 August 2025, KMB received approval from the Transport Department to operate 11.3-metre Enviro 500 MMC Facelift buses, fitted with manual retarders and front collision-protection frames, on the route from 24 August; all such vehicles have seat belts fitted.

Under the regulations, heavy vehicles must also stop at a bus stop or passing place on the downhill sections (southbound: from Tai Mo Shan Country Park to Muk Min Ha Tsuen; northbound: from Tai Mo Shan Country Park to Shek Kong) to test their braking systems before descending in low gear.

=== Pedestrian crossing issue near Fu Yung Shan ===
There is a zebra crossing at the junction of Route Twisk and Fu Yung Shan Road, which is the route that residents of Fu Yung Shan village and the surrounding area must use to reach urban Tsuen Wan. However, this section of the road has many sharp bends, and combined with vehicles travelling at high speed, this increases the risk of traffic accidents. In August 2016, residents of Fu Yung Shan collected opinions and gathered more than 300 signatures, calling for the zebra crossing on this section to be converted into a pedestrian-activated signal crossing. The Transport Department responded that it was collecting data on the proposal, including pedestrian and vehicle flow and speed, and would also send staff to conduct a site visit with the councillors before making a decision. The Hong Kong Police Force said it would relay the councillors' views to the New Territories South Traffic Division and jointly step up efforts against illegal road racing and non-compliance with traffic rules on the road, in order to prevent accidents.

== See also ==
- List of streets and roads in Hong Kong
- Lam Kam Road
