= Texaco Road =

Road in New Territories, Hong Kong

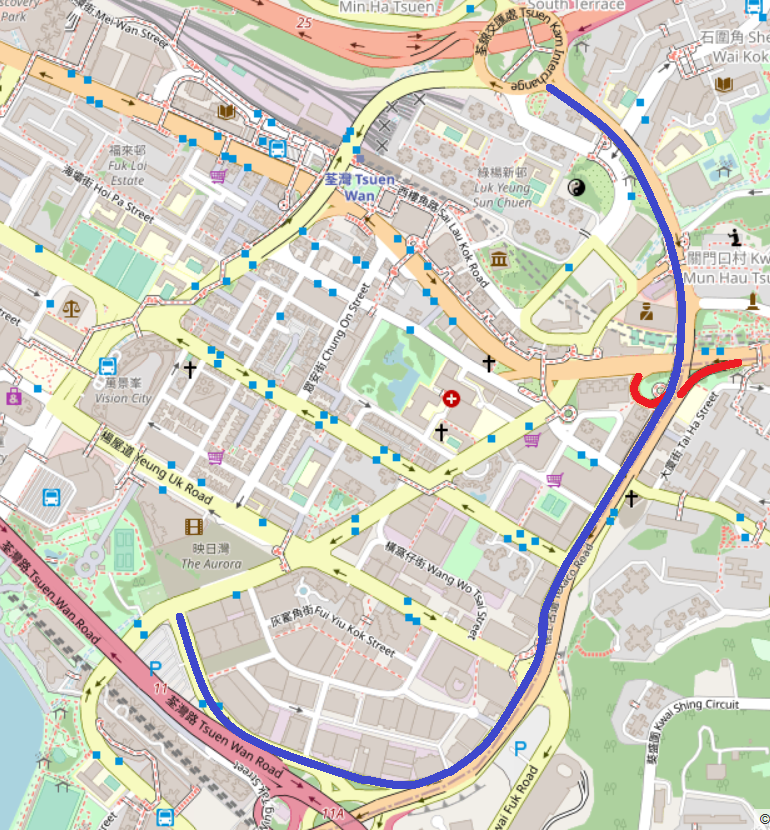
- Map of Texaco Road and Texaco Road North, with the route shown in blue. Map of Texaco Interchange, with the route shown in red.
- Interactive map of Texaco Road
- Former name: 德士古道
- Length: 2.07 km (1.29 mi); Including Texaco Road North
- Location: Kwai Tsing District – Tsuen Wan District, New Territories, Hong Kong; Starting point on Ma Tau Pa Road, Wing Shun Street and Castle Peak Road (Texaco Road North); Ending point on Castle Peak Road (Texaco Road) and Tsuen Kam Interchange (Texaco Road North)

Construction
- Construction start: 1930s; September, 1959 (reconstructed); April, 1989 (Construction of Texaco Road Interchange)

Texaco Road
- Chinese: 德士古道
Transcriptions
Standard Mandarin
- Hanyu Pinyin: Déshìgǔ Dào

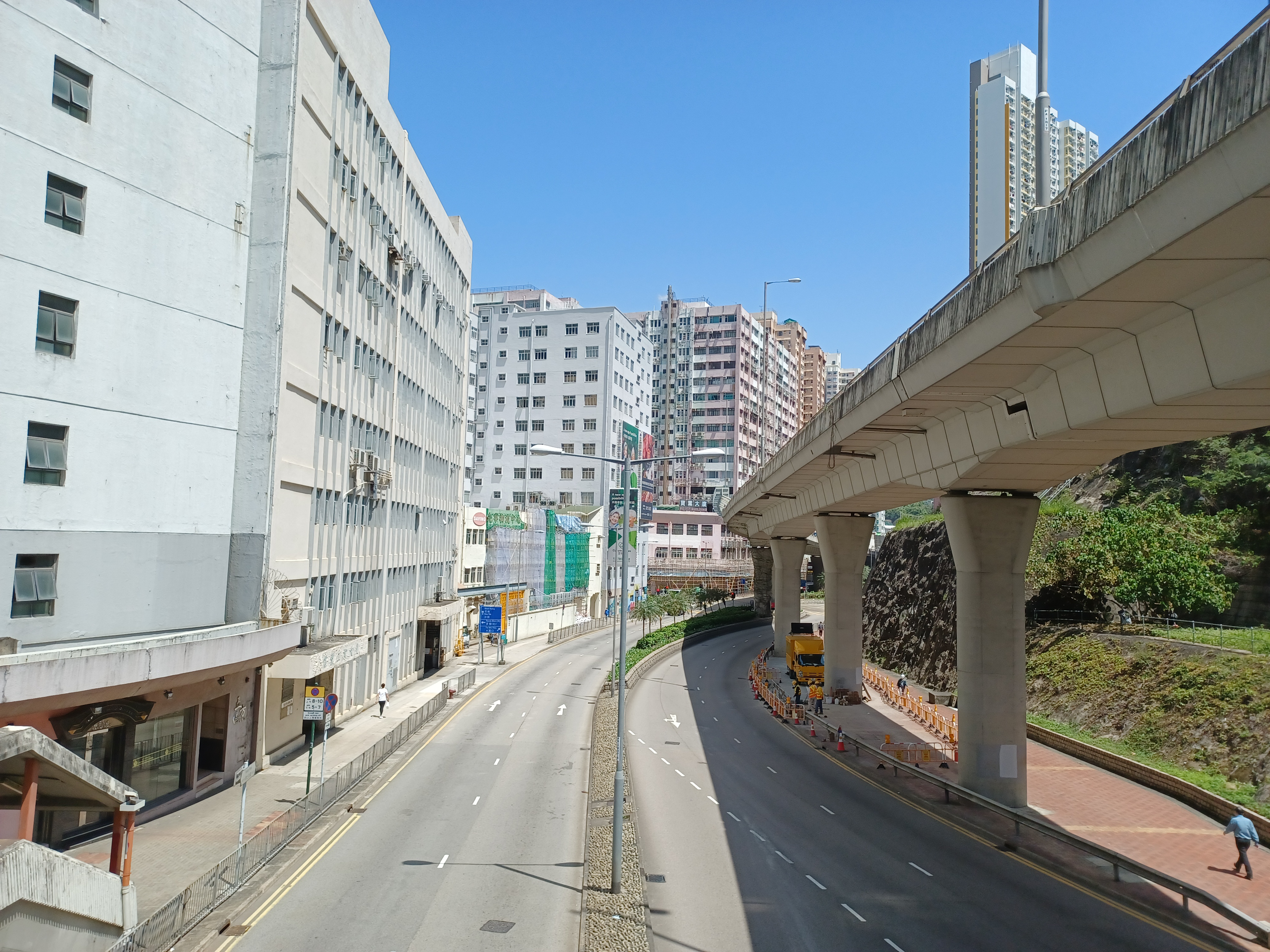
Texaco Road near Yeung Uk Road, with the Texaco Road Interchange above.

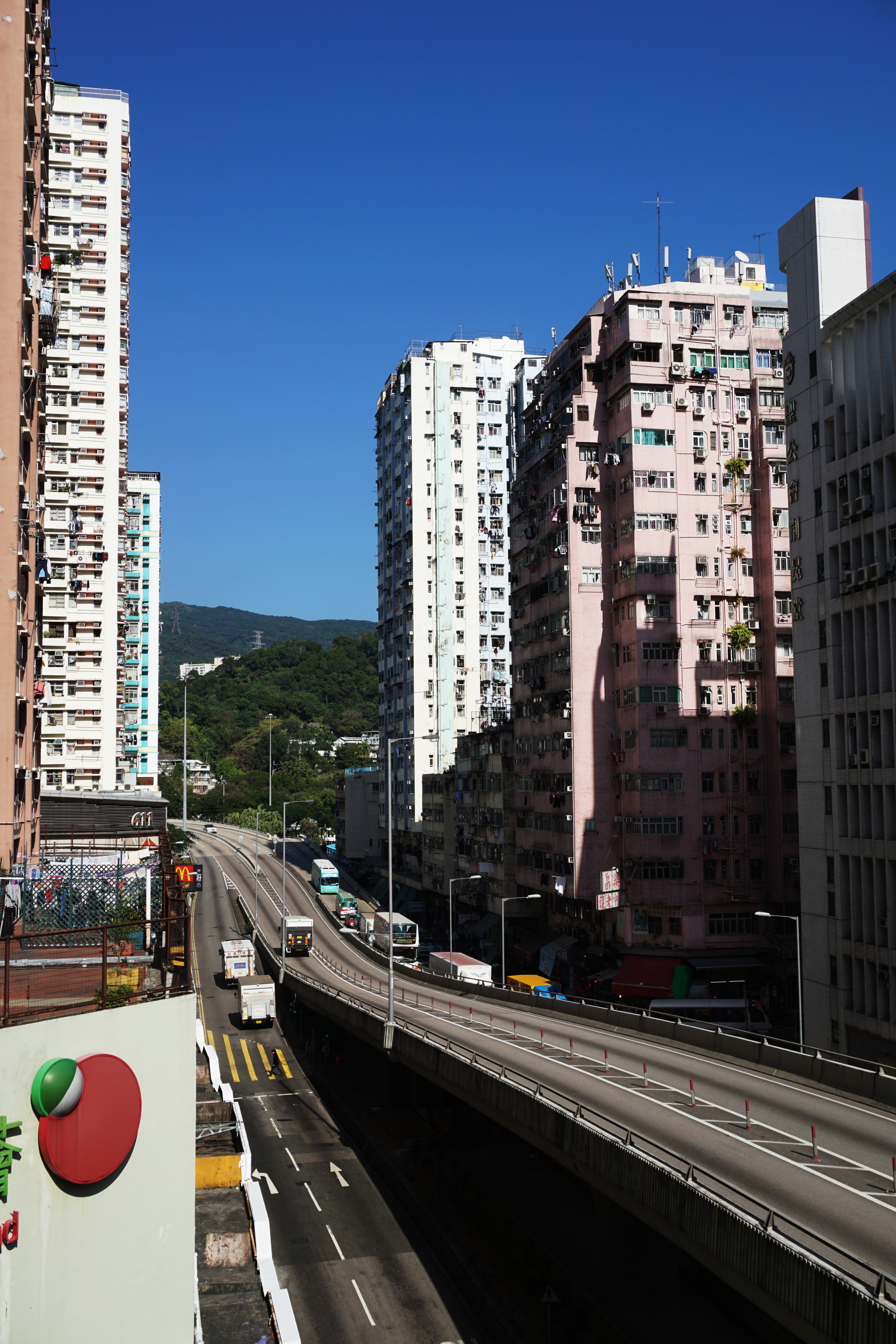
At the junction of Texaco Road and Texaco Road North, the exit to Tsuen Fu Street is on the left, and the intersection with Tai Wo Hau Road is on the right.

Texaco Road (Chinese: 德士古道; Jyutping: dak1 si6 gu2 dou6) is a road in Tsuen Wan, New Territories, Hong Kong. It connects the Tsuen Kam Interchange with Ma Tau Pa Road and Wing Shun Street, intersecting with both the Tsuen Tsing Interchange and Castle Peak Road. Texaco Road, the first internal road in Tsuen Wan, was constructed in the 1930s to facilitate the industrial development of the Texaco Fuel Company at Cape Tsing Yi Bay and was later renovated in 1959. The section of Texaco Road north of Castle Peak Road was constructed later and opened on March 31, 1981; this section is now referred to as Texaco Road North (in Chinese: 德士古道北), and the Texaco Interchange (in Chinese: 德士古交匯處), where Texaco Road intersects Castle Peak Road, was inaugurated on the same day. (Note: James Hayes, 2010.)

During the 1990s, improvement works were conducted on Texaco Road. In the first phase of these works, a single two-lane overpass was constructed to connect Tsuen Wan Road, the Tsing Tsuen Bridge, and Texaco Road North, opening on December 28, 1991. Since the third phase of the improvement project was ultimately canceled, an unfinished bridge from the second phase, completed in 1995, has remained unused and was highlighted in an Ombudsman’s proactive investigation report as a case study. The section of Texaco Road south of Castle Peak Road, running northeast to southwest, marks the boundary between Tsuen Wan District and Kwai Tsing District, and Texaco Road also serves as the dividing line between Phase 1 and Phase 2 of Tsuen Wan Road.

== History ==
Texaco Road is the first internal road in Tsuen Wan. (Note: In his book, The Great Difference: Hong Kong’s New Territories and Its People 1898–2004, James Hayes incorrectly referred to it as the first road in Tsuen Wan. However, the Tsuen Wan section was actually opened as early as 1920 (Hayes, 2010).) Texaco Road was constructed in the 1930s to facilitate the industrial development of the Texaco Fuel Company at the Cape of Tsing Yi Bay. As part of the Tsuen Wan District Improvement Plan, Texaco Road underwent renovation and widening works starting in September 1959, with the project lasting six months. Upon completion, Texaco Road featured two 24-foot-wide traffic lanes, with a 1,500-foot section paved with gravel. A 6-foot-wide median separated the two lanes, with 13-foot-wide sidewalks on each side.

As part of the Tsuen Wan New Town Integrated Development Plan, Texaco Road was officially extended to the Tsuen Kam Interchange on March 31, 1981, at 11 a.m., with the creation of the “Texaco Interchange” to facilitate vehicle access to Texaco Road from Castle Peak Road. The intersection between Shing Mun Road and Castle Peak Road was closed on the same day. Following Route Twisk, the section of Tsuen Kam Road from its original intersection with Castle Peak Road to near Shek Wai Kok Estate was closed to traffic at 11 a.m. the following day, with only a short section remaining for access to Mei Wan Street. The extended section of Texaco Road is now known as “Texaco Road North,” featuring an overpass with a concave shape to accommodate a nearby park. (Note: The Kung Sheung Daily News report referred to it as “Tai Wo Hau Garden (大窩口公園).” "圓環公園" (Map). Google Maps.) The bridge deck is supported by branched struts, with the underside incorporated as part of the park extension.

=== Improvements ===
After the completion of the Tsing Tsuen Bridge and Shing Mun Tunnel (then called “Route 5”), the traffic volume on Texaco Road increased significantly, surpassing its capacity. As a result, the Hong Kong government implemented improvement works on Texaco Road, carried out in three phases. Phase 1 involved constructing the Texaco Road Overpass, widening Texaco Road, and rerouting a section of Kwai Fuk Road. The project, managed by AECOM as the consulting engineer and constructed by Leighton Contractors, cost HK$127 million. Construction began in April 1989, and the Texaco Road Overpass opened to traffic on December 28, 1991, with the inauguration ceremony held the next day by acting director of Territory Development Chow Che-King. Phase 2 primarily involved constructing the Tsuen Tsing Interchange and a section of reserved overpass, which started in April 1992 and was completed in 1995. During Phase 2, a 300-meter section of overpass and connection point were pre-built at the northeastern end of the Tsuen Tsing Interchange on Tsing Tsuen Road to facilitate the connection of the southbound overpass in the future Phase 3. The overpass segment and connection point were completed in 1995. However, in 1999, the Transport Bureau decided to shelve Phase 3 after reviewing the traffic flow changes in Tsuen Wan District. Additionally, the reclamation plan for Tsuen Wan District was canceled due to the Protection of the Harbour Ordinance, resulting in lower-than-expected traffic growth. In September 2002, Texaco Road's Phase 3 project was removed from the Public Works Programme.

== Route ==
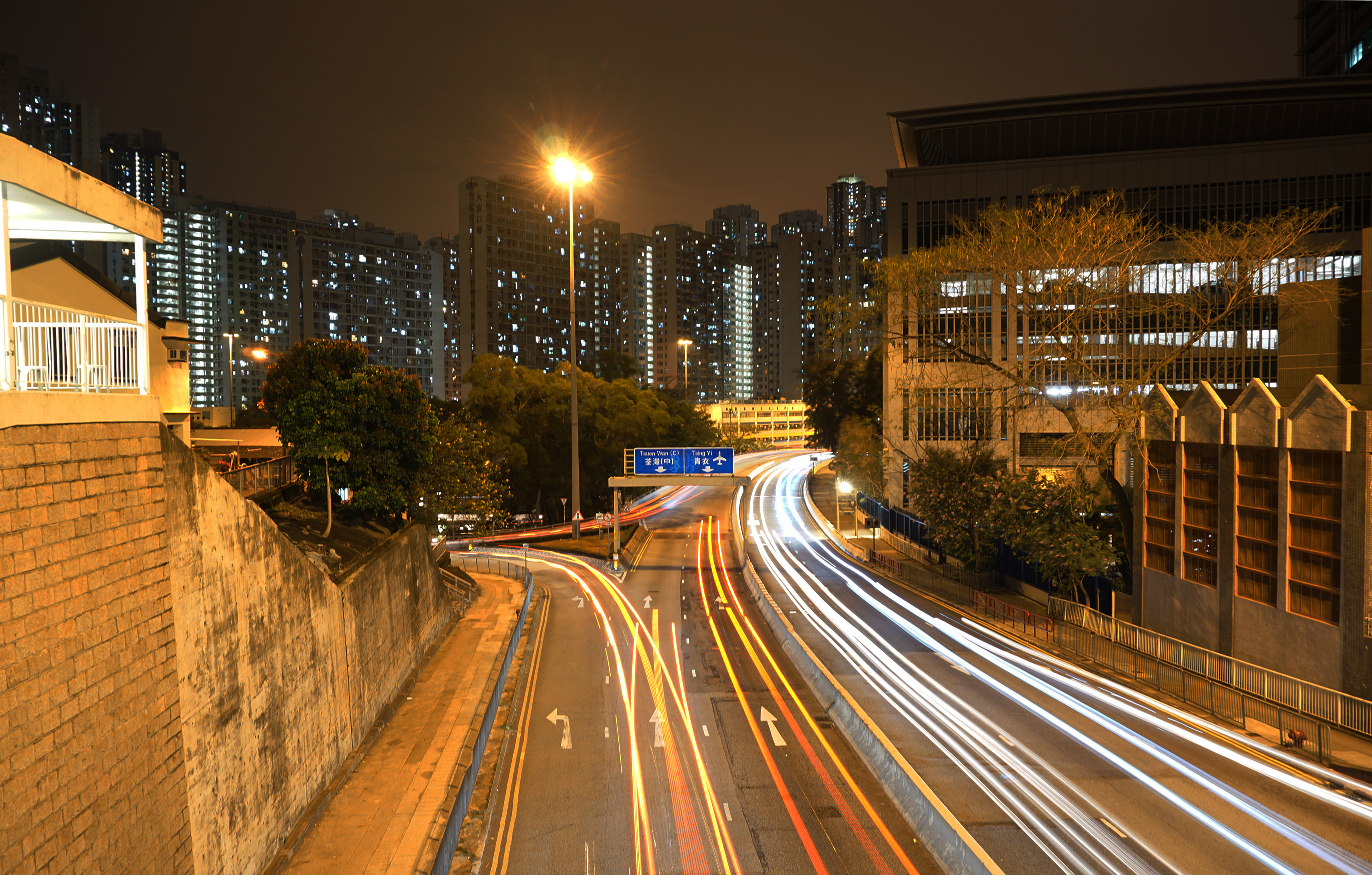
Near the New Territories South Regional Headquarters, on Texaco Road North, there is a left-in, left-out intersection at the junction of Texaco Road North and Kwok Shui Road on the left side.

Texaco Road and Texaco Road North have a combined length of 2.07 kilometers, with Texaco Road itself measuring 1.52 kilometers and Texaco Road North extending for 550 meters. Texaco Road begins at its intersection with Ma Tau Pa Road and Wing Shun Street, heading southeast and intersecting with Wing Tak Street. It then shifts slightly east-southeast and provides exits to Lung Tak Street and the Tsuen Tsing Interchange. Texaco Road then turns northeast, with additional exits to the Tsuen Tsing Interchange and an overpass connection to Tsing Tsuen Road. It continues northeast, intersecting with Yeung Uk Road and Kwai Fuk Road, then with Sha Tsui Road. Texaco Road provides exits to Tsuen Wing Street and Tsuen Fu Street before intersecting with Tai Wo Hau Road. A segment of Texaco Road, oriented northeast–southwest, includes an overpass that crosses the ground level route. The overpass and ground-level section merge, crossing Castle Peak Road and continuing onto Texaco Road North. Texaco Road North then gradually curves northwest, intersecting with Kwok Shui Road and Shing Mun Road (west section) through left-in/left-out junctions, while the east section of Shing Mun Road merges onto Texaco Road North. Finally, Texaco Road North continues northwest to the Tsuen Kam Interchange.

Texaco Road features a 700-meter overpass that begins at the Tsing Tsuen Bridge approach and ends near Tak Tai Path. The section of Texaco Road North near Shek Wai Kok Road previously had an exit to that road, which was permanently closed and rerouted on April 9, 1988. The western end of Shek Wai Kok Road now connects to Wai Tsuen Road, with no direct access to Texaco Road North. Access from Texaco Road North to Shek Wai Kok Road now requires passing through the Tsuen Kam Interchange and Wai Tsuen Road.

=== Exit ===
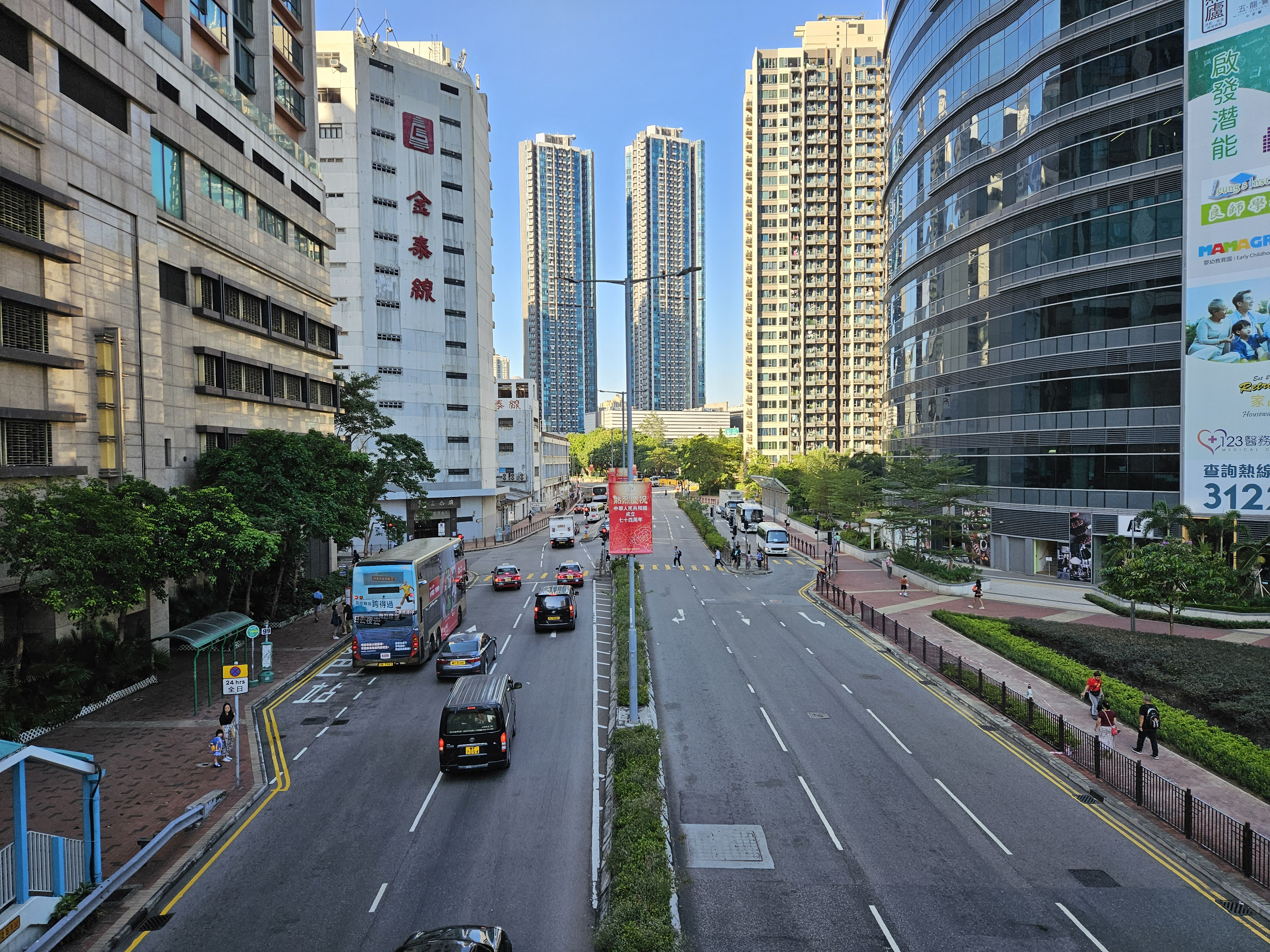
Ma Tau Pa Road.

Both Texaco Road and Texaco Road North are located within the Tsuen Wan District; however, the segment of Texaco Road running in a northeast–southwest direction also belongs to the Kwai Tsing District and serves as the boundary between both districts. In the description below, “upbound” refers to the direction from the intersection of Texaco Road with Ma Tau Pa Road and Wing Shun Street towards the Tsuen Kam Interchange or Castle Peak Road towards Kwu Tung, while “downbound” refers to the opposite direction.

Road section	Distance (kilometer)	Destination	Notes
Texaco Road	0.0	Ma Tau Pa Road, Wing Shun Street	East to Mau Tau Pa Road, west to Wing Shun Street.
Texaco Road	0.24	Wing Tak Street	
Texaco Road	0.35	Lung Tak Street	Entry to Texaco Road (upbound only)
Texaco Road	0.45–0.6	Tsuen Tsing Interchange: Route towards Tsuen Wan Road and Tsing Tsuen Road	Roundabout. Route 5 westbound to Tuen Mun Road, eastbound to Kwai Chung Road.
Texaco Road	0.85	Yeung Uk Road, Kwai Fuk Road	West to Yeung Uk Road, east to Kwai Fuk Road.
Texaco Road	1.1	Sha Tsui Road	
Texaco Road	1.2	Tsuen Wing Street	Entry from Texaco Road (upbound) only.
Texaco Road	1.3	Tsuen Fu Street, Tai Wo Hau Road	Tsuen Fu Street entry from Texaco Road (upbound) only. Tai Wo Hau Road accessible from both upbound and downbound directions, but entry from downbound only.
Texaco Road	1.4	Texaco Interchange: Castle Peak Road	Entry from Castle Peak Road (upbound) only; vehicles on Texaco Road (downbound) can access surface lanes only.
Texaco Road North	1.6	Kwok Shui Road	Left-in, left-out only for Texaco Road (downbound).
Texaco Road North	1.7	Shing Mun Road (western section)	Left-in, left-out only for Texaco Road (upbound).
Texaco Road North	1.7	Shing Mun Road (eastern section)	Entry to Texaco Road (downbound) only.
Texaco Road North	2.07	Tsuen Kam Interchange: Route towards Cheung Pei Shan Road, Tsuen Kam Road, Tai Ho Road North, Wai Tsuen Road	Roundabout. Route 9, Direction A (clockwise), towards Castle Peak Road—Tsuen Wan Section and Tuen Mun Road; Direction B (counterclockwise), towards Shing Mun Tunnel.

== Current status ==
The section of Texaco Road that runs in a northeast–southwest direction belongs to both Tsuen Wan District and Kwai Tsing District, serving as the boundary between the two. Phases 1 and 2 of Tsuen Wan Road also use Texaco Road as a boundary: the section from Texaco Road to Kwai Chung Road is Phase 1, while the section from Texaco Road to Tuen Mun Road is Phase 2. According to Chapter 374E of the Hong Kong Laws, "Road Traffic (Registration and Licensing of Vehicles) Regulations," Texaco Road (excluding the section from Ma Tau Pa Road to Tsuen Tsing Interchange) and Texaco Road North permit New Territories taxis to operate.

In July 2002, the Environment, Transport and Works Bureau submitted a proposal to the Environmental Affairs Panel of the Legislative Council suggesting a ban on all vehicles from using the Texaco Road Interchange between midnight and 6 a.m. to reduce traffic noise impacting nearby residences. However, this proposal faced strong opposition from the taxi and truck transportation sectors. Subsequently, the Environmental Affairs Panel of the Legislative Council passed a motion, and from July 4, 2005, a traffic management plan was implemented on the Texaco Road Interchange. This plan established a restricted area, prohibiting franchised buses from using the flyover between midnight and 6 a.m. Additionally, the section of Texaco Road North from Kwok Shui Road to Tsuen Kam Interchange was included in a trial program for low-noise road surfacing. Since bus noise along the surface level of Texaco Road is partially shielded by nearby building platforms, the peak traffic noise caused by passing buses is reduced by at least 5 decibels.

=== Average daily traffic volume ===
Below are the 2021 average daily traffic volume figures for each section of Texaco Road and Texaco Road North. The Transport Department of Hong Kong classifies the Texaco Road Interchange and Texaco Road North as “Primary Distributor (PD),” while the surface section of Texaco Road is designated as a “District Distributor (DD).”

Road	Section	AADT (vehicle count)	Estimated data	Road type
Texaco Road (surface section)	From the intersection with Ma Tau Pa Road and Wing Shun Street to Tsuen Tsing Interchange (combined with the section of Ma Tau Pa Road from its intersection with Wing Shun Street to Yeung Uk Road)	15,160	Yes	District Distributor
Texaco Road (surface section)	From the southern end of Texaco Road to Texaco Road Interchange	56,560	No	District Distributor
Texaco Road (surface section)	From Tsuen Tsing Interchange slip road to Sha Tsui Road	32,420	No	District Distributor
Texaco Road (surface section)	From 124 Texaco Road to Yeung Uk Road	72,250	No	District Distributor
Texaco Road (surface section)	From Sha Tsui Road to Tsuen Fu Street	28,290	Yes	District Distributor
Texaco Road (surface section)	From Tsuen Fu Street to Texaco Road North	45,930	Yes	District Distributor
Texaco Interchange	From Tsuen Tsing Interchange to Tak Tai Path	31,220	Yes	Primary Distributor
Texaco Road North	From Castle Peak Road—Tsuen Wan Section to Shek Wai Kok Road	35,590	Yes	Primary Distributor
Texaco Road North	From Shek Wai Kok Road to Tsuen Kam Interchange	24,020	Yes	Primary Distributor

=== Texaco Road Bridge ===
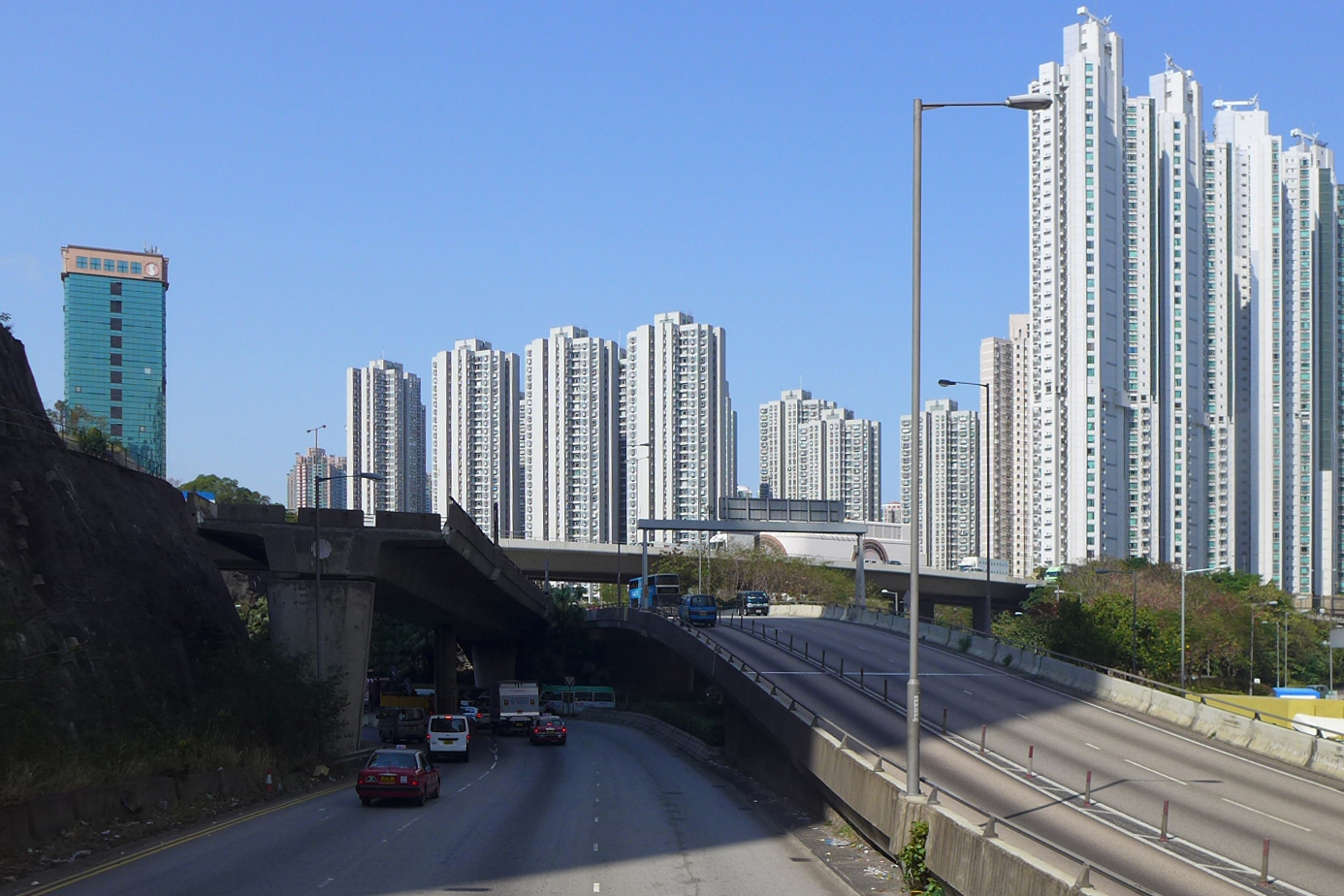
At the northeastern section of Tsing Tsuen Road within Tsuen Tsing Interchange, the Civil Engineering and Development Department constructed a roughly 300-meter-long bridge section with a connecting ramp (on the left), completed in 1995. This section has remained unused since its completion. Below it is the exit connecting Texaco Road with Tsuen Tsing Interchange, and on the right is the bridge connecting to Tsing Tsuen Road.

During Phase 2 of Texaco Road's improvement works, the Civil Engineering and Development Department preemptively built a 300-meter-long bridge segment with a connecting ramp at the northeast corner of Tsuen Tsing Interchange on Tsing Tsuen Road to facilitate the planned southbound interchange in Phase 3. The flyover section and connecting ramp were completed in 1995, with the project costing HK$5.8 million. The surface roundabout at Tsuen Tsing Interchange has long been a significant traffic congestion point between Tsuen Wan and Kwai Tsing districts. Since the flyover is located above this interchange, the construction of the flyover in this increasingly busy area during Phase 3 was expected to cause severe and continuous daytime congestion. Therefore, after evaluating the social costs, the government decided that the flyover should be pre-built during Phase 2 at Tsuen Tsing Interchange to minimize traffic disruption and social costs. In 1999, the Transport Bureau reviewed traffic patterns in Tsuen Wan District and decided to shelve Phase 3, believing that Route 9 would divert heavy vehicles away from Texaco Road Interchange. The Civil Engineering and Transport Departments informed the Kwai Tsing District Council's Traffic and Transport Committee of this decision in June 2000, with an update to Tsuen Wan District Council in November. Due to a subsequent halt on Tsuen Wan's reclamation plans under the Protection of the Harbour Ordinance, traffic growth in the area was slower than anticipated. In September 2002, Phase 3 of Texaco Road was removed from the Public Works Programme.

From 2010 to 2014, the Tsuen Wan and Kwai Tsing District Councils' respective Traffic and Transport Committees requested the government connect the stub bridge to Texaco Road surface lanes to ease traffic from Tsuen Wan to Tsing Yi and reduce congestion at Tsuen Tsing Interchange. However, the Transport Department indicated that Texaco Road Interchange met current local traffic needs, so no plans for Phase 3 were initiated. In May 2016, the Tsuen Wan District Council's Traffic and Transport Committee once again urged the Transport Department to construct the unfinished Texaco Road Interchange. The Transport Department noted that they would assess updated traffic data in light of new developments in Tsuen Wan. In August 2016, LegCo member and Tsuen Wan District Councillor Ben Chan criticized the government's handling of this issue, suggesting that they had ignored his previous proposal to complete the bridge until the joint meetings between the Tsuen Wan and Kwai Tsing District Councils with the government in 2015. He again proposed connecting the stub bridge to Texaco Road's surface lanes, to which the government provided an unsatisfactory response.

On June 15, 2017, during the third meeting of the year, the Kwai Tsing District Council's Traffic and Transport Committee considered using the Texaco Road stub bridge to construct a new bridge. Members Jonathan Tsui Hiu-kit and Law King-shing put forward a motion to "urge the Transport Department and Highways Department to promptly complete the Texaco Road stub bridge to alleviate traffic congestion in Tsing Yi and Tsuen Wan," which was unanimously passed by the committee. The Highways Department later included the connection of the stub bridge as part of the Tsuen Wan Road widening study, with related surveys commencing in May 2019. The issue of the Texaco Road stub bridge was addressed as a case in the Ombudsman's proactive investigation report, “Issues with Idle Interchanges and ‘Stub Bridges,’” published on March 5, 2020. In February 2021, the Highways Department submitted a proposal to the Kwai Tsing District Council for improvements at Tsuen Tsing Interchange, suggesting the construction of a one-way slip road connecting the stub bridge to divert traffic from Yeung Uk Road, Kwai Fuk Road, and Texaco Road surface lanes towards Tsing Yi, reducing traffic at the interchange.

== See also ==
- Route Twisk
- Tsing Yi North Bridge
- Tsuen Wan Road
- Kwok Shui Road
