= Kwok Shui Road =

Road in New Territories, Hong Kong

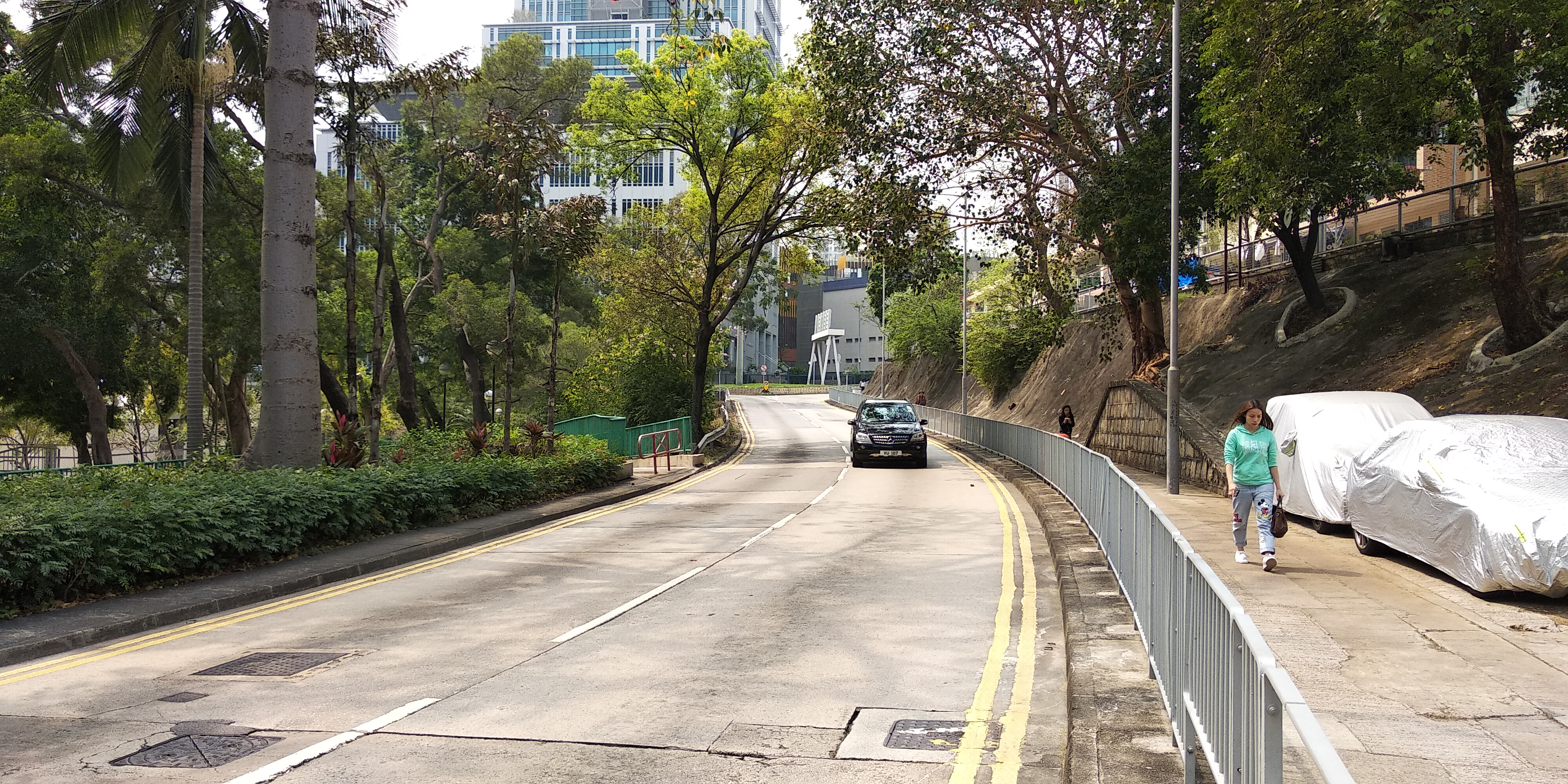
- Kwok Shui Road, near Texaco Road North, with a left-in/left-out intersection in the distance for the two roads.

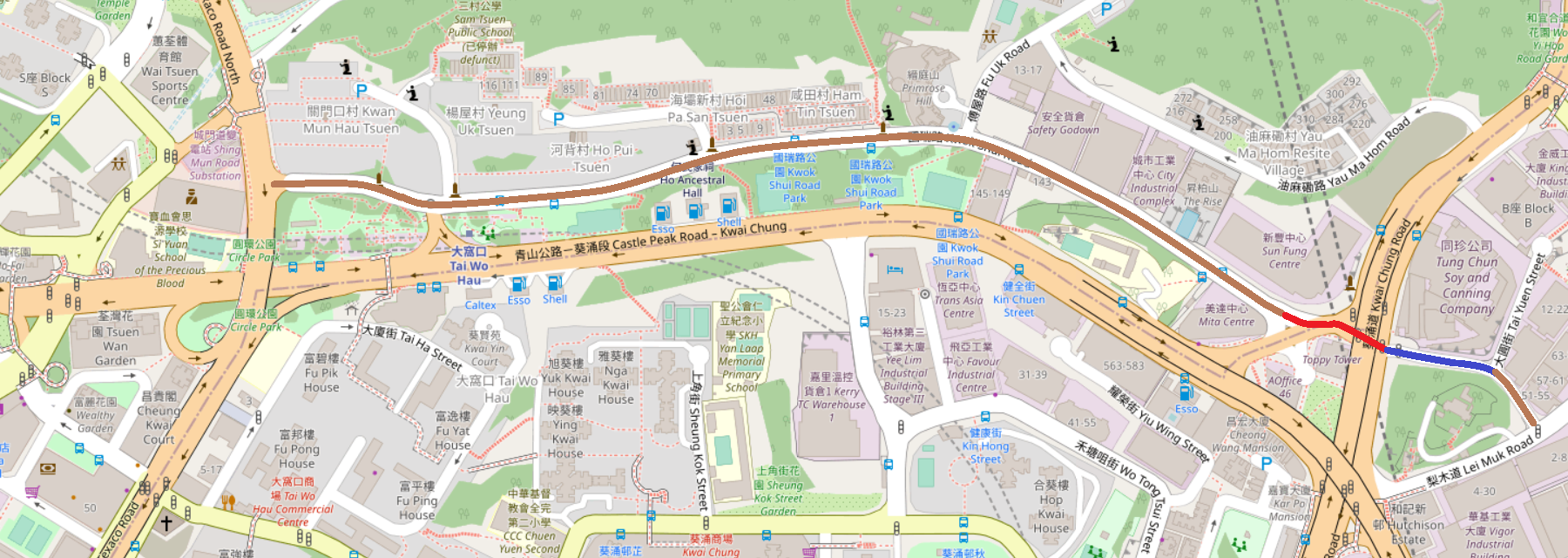
- Map of Kwok Shui: two-way sections are marked in brown, westbound one-way sections are marked in blue, and eastbound one-way sections are marked in red.
- Native name: 國瑞路 (Chinese)
- Former name: Kwok Shui Avenue (國瑞道)
- Length: 1,447.8 m (4,750 ft); Including Texaco Road North
- Location: Tsuen Wan, Kwai Tsing District, New Territories, Hong Kong; Two-lane two-way road (undivided single-lane two-way section): From Tai Yuen Street to Cheung Wing Road; Four-lane one-way eastbound road: From Cheung Wing Road to Castle Peak Road - Kwai Chung Section.

Kwok Shui Road (Chinese: 國瑞路), formerly known as Kwok Shui Avenue (Chinese: 國瑞道), is a road in the Tsuen Wan New Town of the New Territories, Hong Kong. It connects Lei Muk Road in Upper Kwai Chung to Texaco Road North in Tsuen Wan and intersects with two main roads, Cheung Wing Road and Castle Peak Road (Kwai Chung Section). The section of Kwok Shui east of Cheung Wing Road falls within the Kwai Tsing District, while the remaining segments are part of Tsuen Wan District. Kwok Shui Road is named after Yeung Kwok-shui, a scholar member of Tsuen Wan, in recognition of his lifetime contributions to the community. The entire stretch of Kwok Shui Road consists of two lanes, with a short section near Castle Peak Road (Kwai Chung Section), Cheung Wing Road, and Kwai Chung Road forming a signalized roundabout, known as Cheung Wing Road Roundabout.

== Denomination ==
In the 1970s, the Hong Kong government developed Tsuen Wan as a satellite town, leading to the relocation of villages such as Yeung Uk Village. On March 6, 1970, the New Territories District Commission announced in an official gazette the naming of the road in front of the new Yeung Uk Village. The road was named Kwok Shui Road in memory of Tsuen Wan native Yeung Kwok-shui, a distinguished gentleman who had lived in Yeung Uk Village, to honor his lifelong service and contributions to Tsuen Wan.

== Route ==
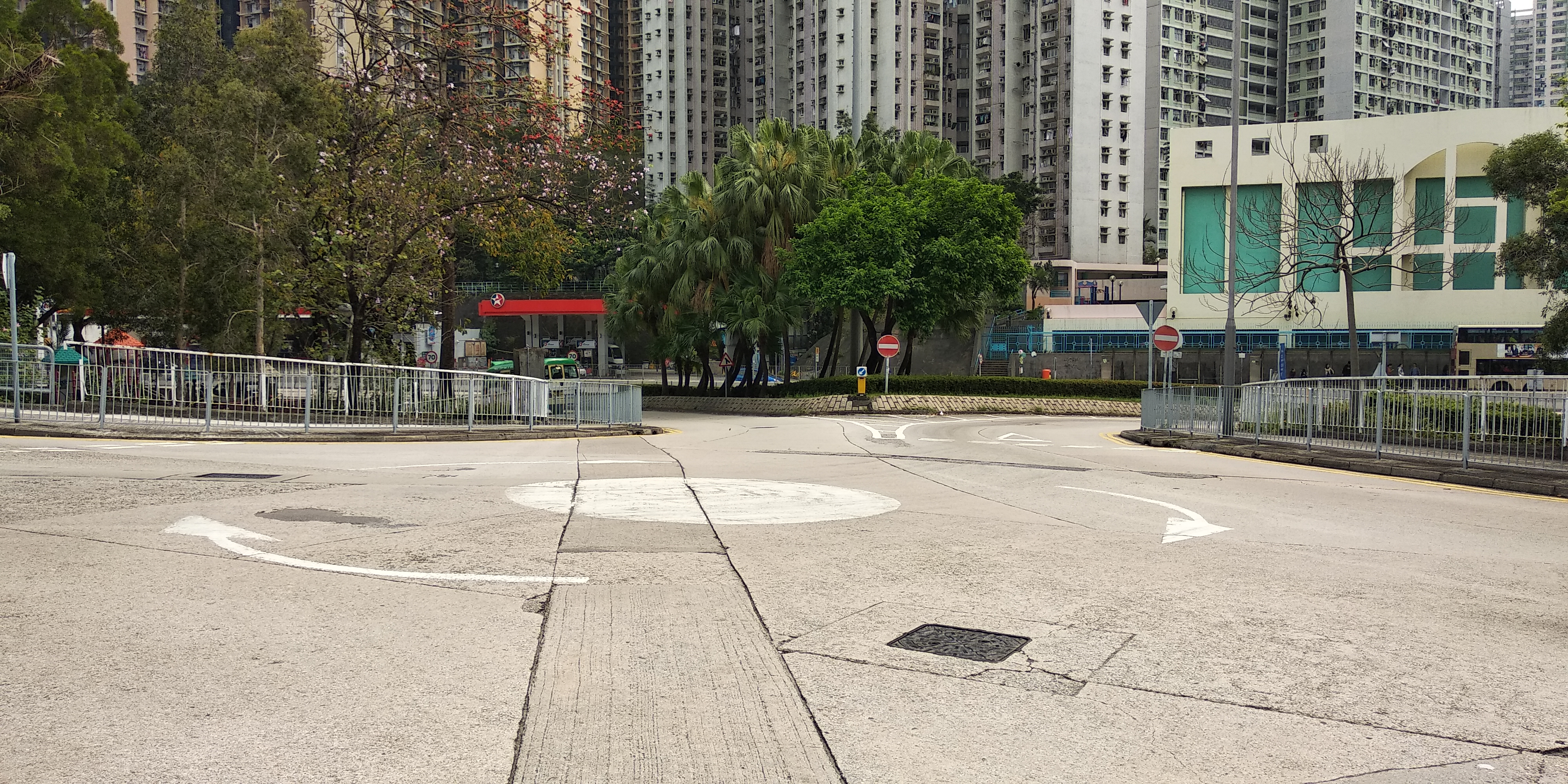
Roundabout at Kwok Shui Road with access to Castle Peak Road-Kwai Chung Section in the Kowloon direction, limited to left-in, left-out access.

According to the Hong Kong Government Gazette from the time of its naming, Kwok Shui Road is 1,447.8 meters long. It begins at the junction with Lei Muk Road, running roughly northwest for about 655.32 meters, then turns west for about 716.28 meters, and finally turns northwest for about 76.2 meters, ending at the junction with Shing Mun Road. (Note: The original text uses foot as the unit of road length, with the three sections measuring 2,150 ft, 2,350 ft, and ft, respectively, for a total of 4,750 ft (International Yard and Pound Agreement). According to the 1959 agreement, 1 yard is defined as 0.9144 meters or 3 feet.)

=== Intersections ===
Location	Distance (km)	Destination	Notes
Kwai Tsing District	0.0	Lei Muk Road	
Kwai Tsing District	0.073	Tai Yuen Street	One-way westbound from this point onward.
Kwai Tsing District	0.2	Cheung Wing Road	One-way eastbound from this point; part of a traffic-signal roundabout. Left turns only.
Tsuen Wan District	0.268	Castle Peak Road - Kwai Chung Section	Two-way traffic resumes westward here, ending the traffic-signal roundabout section.
Tsuen Wan District	0.7	Fu Uk Road	
Tsuen Wan District	0.95	Ting Fung Street	
Tsuen Wan District	1.2	Dingguo Street	Entry only via Texaco Road.
Tsuen Wan District	1.2	Castle Peak Road - Kwai Chung Section	Roundabout; side road only allows left-in, left-out access toward Kowloon.
Tsuen Wan District	1.4	Texaco Road North	Left-in, left-out only on Texaco Road North

== Current conditions ==
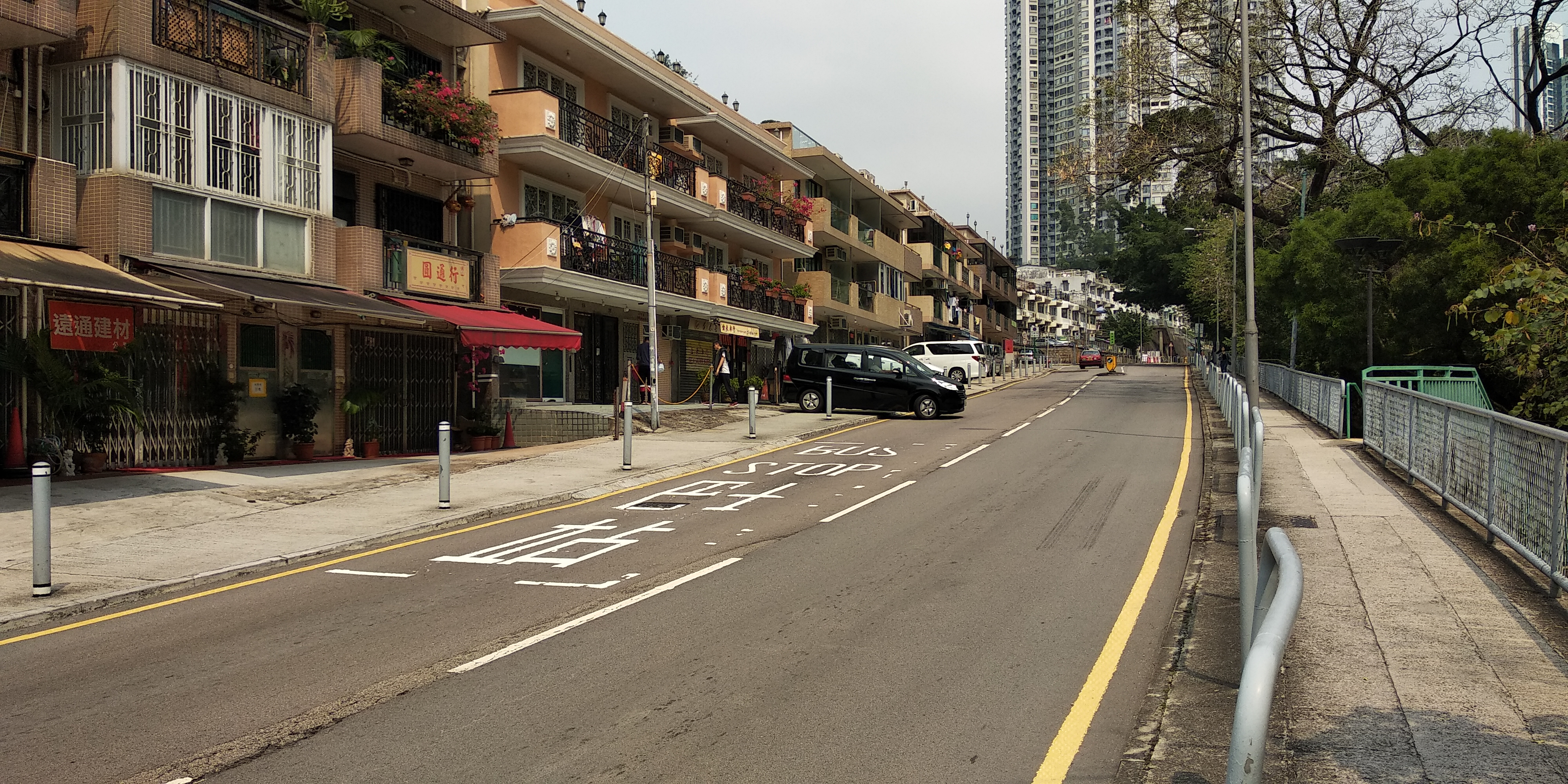
Near Ho Pui Village on Kwok Shui Road.

Although the section of Kwok Shui Road near Ting Fung Street and the adjacent Ho Pui Village is a two-lane, bi-directional road (one lane in each direction without a divider), frequent illegal parking effectively reduces it to a single-lane, bi-directional road (vehicles in both directions are forced to use the same lane). As a result, many vehicles are forced to cross into the opposite lane to pass through. Additionally, with several warehouses located along Kwok Shui Road, numerous trucks wait to enter these warehouses, causing long queues of vehicles to spill out onto the road. This leads to road congestion, resulting in bus delays, pedestrians crossing between large vehicles, and issues such as noise and air pollution. In response to a meeting of the Tsuen Wan District Council, the Transport Department indicated that it has notified the Highways Department to arrange a road-widening project for this section. The project will narrow the sidewalks to expand the roadway. However, since the project involves slope excavation and other work, a preliminary study is required, and the Transport Department has not yet provided a timetable for commencement.

Frequent underground water pipe bursts occur on Kwok Shui Road. These pipe bursts not only cause cracks in the road surface but also require the full closure of Kwok Shui Road. The section near Kwan Mun Hau Street has been designated by the Water Supplies Department as one of Hong Kong's 56 "burst pipe hotspots" as of February 29, 2020, and it is the only such hotspot in the Tsuen Wan District. Repair work on the underground water pipes in this section has been completed. The Water Supplies Department is also conducting a 230-meter improvement project on the fresh water pipes along the section of Kwok Shui Road from Kawn Mun Hau Street to Ting Fung Street. Following this, a 624-meter improvement project is planned for the section from Ting Fung Street to Cheung Wing Road.
