= Integrated Brilliant Education =

IBEL
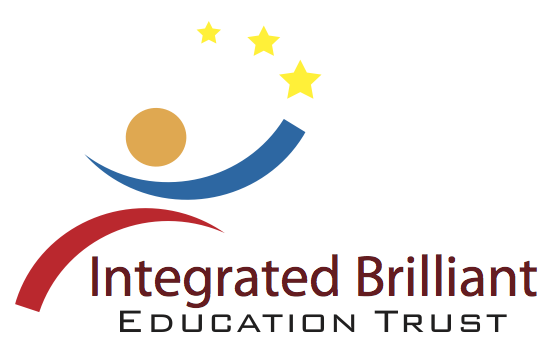
- Company type: Charitable organization
- Founded: January 2014
- Headquarters: Hong Kong, China
- Founders: Geetanjali Dhar, Manoj Dhar
- Website: ibelhk.org

Integrated Brilliant Education Limited is a registered charity in Hong Kong (IR 91/16221), with Section 88 Inland Revenue Ordinance tax-exempt status.

== History ==
Founded in 2014 by Manoj Dhar and Geetanjali Dhar, Integrated Brilliant Education Limited (IBEL), oversees the operations of two Education Centers. The charity has gradually increased its footprint in the underprivileged non-Chinese–speaking segment since its conception.

== Integrated Brilliant Education Center (Jordan) ==
School registered under Section 13 of Education Ordinance Registration Number 601543 Integrated Brilliant Education Center was launched in January 2015 in Jordan with and serves marginalized non-Chinese-speaking students in the Yau Tsim Mong district.

Location: 6/F, Cheung Wah Commercial Building,3-5 Saigon Street, Jordan, (Jordan MTR Exit B1) Tel: 2677 7778/6 Fax: 2677 7775 地址: 九龍佐敦西貢街 3-5號昌華商業大廈 6樓, (佐敦 地鐵站 B1出口 ), 電話: 2677 7778/6 傳真 : 2677 7775

== Integrated Brilliant Education Center (Sham Shui Po) ==
School registered under Section 13 of Education Ordinance Registration Number 610178 Integrated Brilliant Education Center (Sham Shui Po), IBET's second center was launched in April 2018 in one the poorest districts of Hong Kong and serves the underprivileged non-Chinese-speaking students in the Sham Shui Po district.

Location: Room 404 & 405 4/F Hang Seng Castle Peak Road Building, No.339 Castle Peak Road, Cheung Sha Wan, Kowloon, (Cheung Sha Wan MTR Exit C2) Tel: 3108 9040 /1 Fax: 3108 9042 地址: 九龍長沙灣青山道339號恆生青山道大廈4樓404 – 405室, (長沙灣地鐵站C2出口) 電話: 3108 9040 /1 傳真 : 3108 9042

IBEL propagates a unique model in which it has a pool of tutors and teachers which allows them to go in-depth into the needs for each student.

== Supporting Partner Network ==
=== Supporting Schools ===
- West Island School
- French International School

=== Universities ===
- Chinese University of Hong Kong
- Hong Kong University
- City University of Hong Kong

== Awards ==
- Operation Santa Claus

== Accreditation ==
Integrated Brilliant Education Ltd is certified as equivalent to a U.S. public charity. The due diligence and "Equivalency Determination" analysis was conducted by techsoup and an Equivalency Determination certificate for IBEL is available in the NGO source repository of ED certified organizations.
