= Route 9 (Hong Kong) =

Series of roads in Hong Kong

Route 9

- Alignment and exits of Route 9 (zoom in to view exit details)

Route information
- Part of AH1
- Maintained by Highways Department
- Length: 70.8 km (44.0 mi)
- Existed: 1977 (Tuen Mun Road)–present

Major junctions
- Beltway around New Territories
- From: Shing Mun Tunnels toll plaza near Wo Yi Hop
- Route 8 in Sha Tin Town Centre; Route 1 in Fo Tan; Route 2 in Ma Liu Shui; Route 3 near Au Tau; Route 10 near Lam Tei; Route 3 near Ting Kau; Route 5 near Chai Wan Kok
- To: Shing Mun Tunnels toll plaza near Wo Yi Hop

Location
- Country: China
- Special administrative region: Hong Kong
- Districts: Tsuen Wan, Sha Tin, Tai Po, North, Yuen Long, Tuen Mun

Highway system
- Transport in Hong Kong; Routes; Roads and Streets
← Route 8	→ Route 10

Route 9 (Chinese: 九號幹綫; Jyutping: gau2 hou6 gon3 sin3), Hong Kong is one of the strategic trunk roads, mostly in the form of a motorway, circumnavigating the New Territories. The route is also known as the New Territories Circular Road (新界環迴公路). Starting from the Shing Mun Tunnels, Route 9 links (moving in an anti-clockwise direction) Sha Tin, Tai Po, Fanling, Sheung Shui, Yuen Long, Tuen Mun and Tsuen Wan. The section between Exit 10 in Kwu Tung and Exit 16 in Lam Tei is part of Asian Highway 1, although the Asian Highway Network is not signed in Hong Kong.

== History ==
Route 9 was established after a shake-up of the route number system in January 2004, replacing the old system which had been used since 1974.

== Route description ==
Route 9 is the longest route in Hong Kong, which is 70.8 kilometers long. Like other strategic routes in Hong Kong, Route 9 consists of several sections.

The section from Tsuen Wan to Sha Tin is derived from the former Route 5, which includes the Shing Mun Tunnels and most of the Tai Po Road – Sha Tin Section. This section was opened in 1990.

Route 9 then runs in a northerly direction via the remaining portion of Tai Po Road – Sha Tin until the Racecourse Interchange, where it continues via the 12.3 km-long Tolo Highway (opened in 1985) to Lam Kam Road Interchange, to the north of Tai Po. The widening of Tolo Highway between Ma Liu Shui and Tai Po to a dual 3-lane motorway was completed in 2003. It is built to full British motorway standards (3/4 lanes and a hard shoulder). The Tolo Highway continues as another dual 3-lane expressway, Fanling Highway, which was completed in three stages between 1985 and 1987, running due north and north-west, connecting Tai Po North and Pak Shek Au, near San Tin.

At San Tin Interchange near Lok Ma Chau, Route 9 turns south towards Au Tau, near Yuen Long onto an expressway known as the San Tin Highway. After interchanging with Route 3, Route 9 runs along the Yuen Long Highway to Lam Tei Interchange, followed by Tuen Mun Road, all the way to Tsuen Wan.

At Tsuen Wan, the section of Route 9 linking Chai Wan Kok and Shek Wai Kok was opened on 8 February 2007. Traffic then continues its way back to the Shing Mun Tunnels via the new road and the existing Cheung Pei Shan Road.

== Exits and interchanges ==
Route 9
District	Location	km (Note: Rounded to the nearest ^{1}/_{10}th of a kilometre)	Exit	A direction (Clockwise) destination	B direction (Counter-clockwise) destination	Notes
Cheung Pei Shan Road
Kwai Tsing	Shek Wai Kok	0.0		Route 9 (Cheung Pei Shan Road) - Tsuen Wan, Kwai Chung		Clockwise-direction terminus
Shing Mun Tunnel Road
Sha Tin	Shing Mun	0.4– 3.1	Shing Mun Tunnels			
Sha Tin	Tai Wai	4.3	1	Tai Po Road — Tai Wai - Tai Wai		Clockwise exit and anticlockwise entrance only
Sha Tin	Sha Tin	5.5	1		Route 8 (Tsing Sha Highway) - Kowloon West	Anticlockwise exit and clockwise entrance only
Sha Tin	Sha Tin	5.6	1	Tai Po Road — Tai Wai - Tai Wai		Exit permanently closed on 8 June 2014. From 2012, was only accessible through clockwise entrance of exit 2. Clockwise exit only
Tai Po Road — Sha Tin
Sha Tin	Sha Tin	6.1	2	Sha Tin Rural Committee Road - Sha Tin Town Centre		
Sha Tin	Fo Tan	6.9	2A		Fo Tan Road / Lok King Street - Fo Tan	Anticlockwise exit and clockwise entrance only
Tai Po Road — Sha Tin
Sha Tin	Fo Tan	7.6	2B		Route 1 ( Sha Tin Road) - Sha Tin Wai, Kowloon Central	Anticlockwise exit and clockwise entrance only
Sha Tin	Fo Tan	8.2	2C	Yuen Wo Road - Penfold Park		Clockwise exit and entrance only
Sha Tin	Fo Tan	8.5	2D		Tai Po Road — Sha Tin - Chinese University, Kau To Shan, Tai Po Kau	Anticlockwise exit and clockwise entrance only. Entrance from Tai Po Road — Ma Liu Shui
Sha Tin	Fo Tan	8.9	3		Sha Tin Racecourse	Anticlockwise exit and clockwise entrance from and to Tolo Highway
Tolo Highway
Sha Tin	Ma Liu Shui	10.1	3A	Route 2 ( Tate's Cairn Highway) - Ma On Shan, Sha Tin Wai, Kowloon East		Clockwise exit and anticlockwise entrance only
Sha Tin	Ma Liu Shui	10.1	4	Chak Cheung Street / Science Park Road - Ma Liu Shui, Ma On Shan; Pak Shek Kok		Clockwise entrance from Sui Cheung Road
Tai Po	Pak Shek Kok	13.4	4A	Chong San Road - Pak Shek Kok, Science Park		No anticlockwise exit
Tai Po	Tai Po	16.0	5	Tai Po Road — Yuen Chau Tsai / Yuen Shin Road / Tai Po Tai Wo Road - Tai Po South, Tai Po Industrial Estate, Tai Po Market		
Tai Po	Tai Po	17.0	5A		Tat Wan Road - Tai Po South	Anticlockwise exit and clockwise entrance only
Tai Po	Tai Wo	19.5	6	Tai Po Tai Wo Road - Tai Po North, Tai Wo		
Fanling Highway
Tai Po	Lam Tsuen	20.8	7	Lam Kam Road / Tai Po Road — Tai Wo / Tai Wo Service Road West / Hong Lok Yuen Road - Shek Kong, Tai Po North, Hong Lok Yuen		
Tai Po	Kau Lung Hang	23.5	7A	Heung Yuen Wai Highway - Kau Lung Hang, Sha Tau Kok, Heung Yuen Wai Control Point		
North	Fanling	23.9	7B		Pak Wo Road - Wo Hop Shek	Anticlockwise exit and clockwise entrance only. Entrance from Jockey Club Road
North	Fanling	24.1	7C		Pak Wo Road - Fanling, Sha Tau Kok	Anticlockwise exit and clockwise entrance only. Entrance from Jockey Club Road
North	Sheung Shui	26.1	8	So Kwun Po Road - Fanling, Sheung Shui		
North	Sheung Shui	26.9	9	Fan Kam Road / Po Shek Wu Road - Sheung Shui, Kwu Tung, Shek Kong, Man Kam To		
North	Kwu Tung	29.9	9A		Castle Peak Road — Chau Tau / Kwu Tung Road - Kwu Tung, Chau Tau	Anticlockwise exit and clockwise exit only
San Tin Highway
Yuen Long	Kwu Tung	31.3	10		San Sham Road ( AH1) / Castle Peak Road — San Tin / Castle Peak Road — Chau Tau / Kwu Tung Road - Shenzhen, Lok Ma Chau, San Tin, Kwu Tung	Eastern concurrency terminus of AH1. This exit has two additional exit ramps; see San Tin Highway for more information. Anticlockwise exits and clockwise entrance from and to Fanling Highway
Yuen Long	Mai Po	33.3	10A	Mai Po Lung Road / Shek Wu Wai Road - Mai Po, San Tin		Clockwise exit and anticlockwise entrance only
Yuen Long	Ngau Tam Mei	36.2	11	Fairview Park Boulevard / Castle Peak Road — Tam Mi / San Tam Road - Fairview Park, San Tin, Ngau Tam Mei, Kam Tin		
Yuen Long Highway
Yuen Long	Au Tau	38.8	12	Route 3 ( Tsing Long Highway) - Tsuen Wan, Tsing Yi, Kowloon, Lantau		
Yuen Long	Shap Pat Heung	39.7	13		Castle Peak Road — Yuen Long - Tai Tong, Yuen Long	Anticlockwise exit and clockwise entrance only. Connected to the other half of exit 13
Yuen Long	Shap Pat Heung	41.3	13	Shap Pat Heung Road - Tai Tong, Yuen Long, Kam Tin		Clockwise exit and anticlockwise entrance only. Connected to the other half of exit 13
Yuen Long	Shap Pat Heung	40.3	13A		Shap Pat Heung Interchange - Yuen Long South, Tai Tong	Anticlockwise exit only. Connected to the other half of exit 13
Yuen Long	Hung Shui Kiu	43.1	14	Long Tin Road - Tin Shui Wai East		
Yuen Long	Hung Shui Kiu	44.6	15	Hung Tin Road - Tin Shui Wai West, Hung Shui Kiu		
Tuen Mun	Lam Tei	46.6	16	Route 10 ( AH1) ( Kong Sham Western Highway) - Ha Tsuen, Shekou		Western concurrency terminus of AH1
Tuen Mun	Lam Tei	47.8	17		Castle Peak Road — Lam Tei / Castle Peak Road — Lingnan / Tsing Lun Road - Lam Tei, Lingnan University	Anticlockwise entrance accessible only from connection at exit 16 from exit ramp to entrance ramp
Tuen Mun Road
Tuen Mun	San Hui	49.1	18	Tsing Tin Road - Tai Hing		
Tuen Mun	San Hui	49.5	19	San Tak Street - San Hui		Clockwise exit and entrance only. Entrance from Yuk Hong Street
Tuen Mun	San Hui	49.9	19		Pui To Road - Tuen Mun Town Centre	Anticlockwise exit and clockwise entrance only
Tuen Mun	Tuen Mun Town Centre	50.2	20		Tuen Fat Road - Tuen Mun Town Centre	Service road parallel to Tuen Hi Road. Anticlockwise exit and entrance only
Tuen Mun	Tuen Mun Town Centre	50.7	20	Tuen Hi Road - Tuen Mun Town Centre		Service road parallel to Tuen Fat Road. Clockwise exit and entrance only
Tuen Mun	Tuen Mun Town Centre	50.9	20A	Tuen Hing Road - Tuen Mun Town Centre		Clockwise exit and anticlockwise entrance only
Tuen Mun Road
Tuen Mun	Tuen Mun South	51.2	21	Wong Chu Road - Tuen Mun South; Butterfly Beach, River Trade Term, Tung Chung, Zhuhai & Macao		
Tuen Mun	Tai Lam	56.2	22	Castle Peak Road — Tai Lam, Castle Peak Road — New Tai Lam - Tai Lam, So Kwun Wat, Tsing Lung Tau		
Tsuen Wan	Sham Tseng	61.7	23	Castle Peak Road — Sham Tseng - Sham Tseng		
Tsuen Wan	Ting Kau	62.6	24		Route 3 ( Ting Kau Bridge) - Tsing Yi, Kowloon, Lantau	Anticlockwise exit and clockwise entrance only
Tsuen Wan	Ting Kau	63.9	24	Route 3 ( Tsing Long Highway) - Yuen Long, Lok Ma Chau, Shenzhen		Clockwise exit and anticlockwise entrance only
Tsuen Wan	Chai Wan Kok	66.7	24A		Route 5 ( Tsuen Wan Road) - Tsuen Wan, Kwai Chung, Kowloon	Anticlockwise exit and clockwise entrance only
Cheung Pei Shan Road
Tsuen Wan	Chai Wan Kok	67.4	24C	Castle Peak Road — Tsuen Wan - Tsuen Wan		No clockwise exit
Tsuen Wan	Tai Wo Hau	68.8	25	Route Twisk / Tai Ho Road North / Texaco Road North/ Wai Tsuen Road - Tsuen Wan, Tai Wo Hau, Kam Tin		
Kwai Tsing	Shek Wai Kok	70.3	25A	Wo Yi Hop Road / Sam Tung Uk Road / Cheung Shan Estate Road East - Shek Wai Kok, Wo Yi Hop, Shing Mun, Kwai Chung		
Kwai Tsing	Shek Wai Kok	70.8		Route 9 (Cheung Pei Shan Road) - Sha Tin, Tai Po		Anticlockwise-direction terminus
1.000 mi = 1.609 km; 1.000 km = 0.621 mi: Closed/former; Concurrency terminus; Incomplete access; Tolled; Route transition

== See also ==
- Transport in Hong Kong
- Fanling Highway
- San Tin Highway
- Tuen Mun Road
- Yuen Long Highway
