= Tsuen Wan Road =

Road in Hong Kong

Tsuen Wan Road
- Part of Route 5
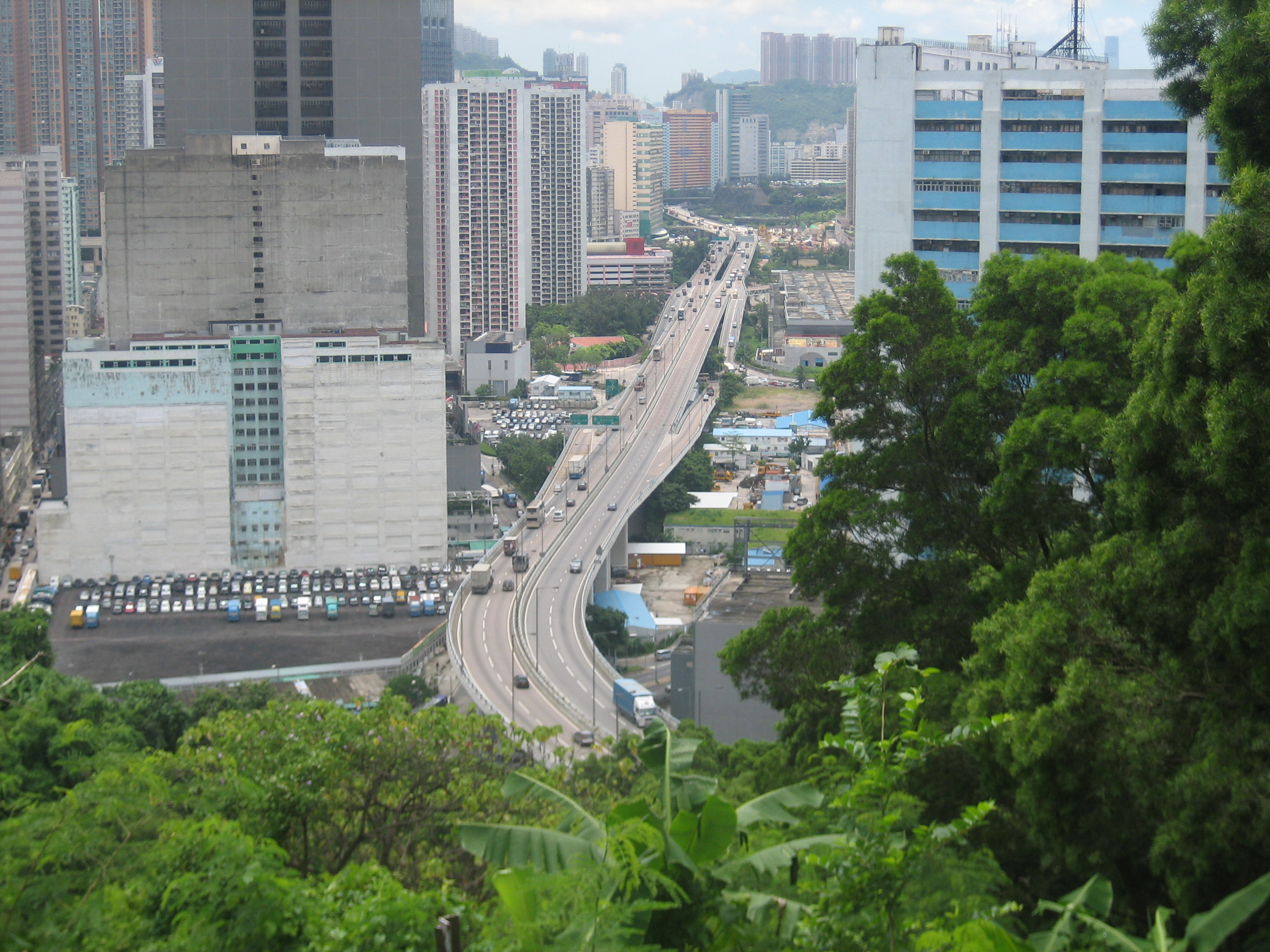
- Tsuen Wan Road viewed from Chai Wan Kok

Route information
- Maintained by Highways Department
- Length: 4.1 km (2.5 mi)
- Existed: 1981–present

Major junctions
- East end: Kwai Tsing Container Terminals
- Route 5 at Kwai Chung Road; Route 9 at Tuen Mun Road
- West end: Chai Wan Kok

Location
- Country: China
- Special administrative region: Hong Kong

Highway system
- Transport in Hong Kong; Routes; Roads and Streets

Tsuen Wan Road
- Traditional Chinese: 荃灣路
Transcriptions
Standard Mandarin
- Hanyu Pinyin: Quánwān Lù

Tsuen Wan Road (Chinese: 荃灣路; Jyutping: cyun4 waan1 lou6) is a major expressway in Tsuen Wan and Kwai Tsing districts, New Territories, Hong Kong. It forms part of Route 5 of Hong Kong's highway system and runs 4.1 kilometers in the east-west direction from Kwai Chung Road near the Kwai Tsing Container Terminals to Tuen Mun Road at Chai Wan Kok. The speed limit of the road is at 70 kilometres per hour. It was opened to traffic in June 1981 and was fully completed in November 1985.

== See also ==
- Footbridge Network in Tsuen Wan
