= Tuen Mun Road =

Highway in New Territories, Hong Kong

Coordinates: 22.361°N 114.037°E

Tuen Mun Road
- Part of Route 9

Route information
- Maintained by Highways Department
- Length: 19.4 km (12.1 mi)
- Existed: 1978–present

Major junctions
- West end: Tuen Mun (near Fu Tei)
- 9; Route 3 at Ting Kau; Route 5 at Tsuen Wan
- East end: Tsuen Wan (near Chai Wan Kok)

Location
- Country: China
- Special administrative region: Hong Kong

Highway system
- Transport in Hong Kong; Routes; Roads and Streets

Tuen Mun Road
- Chinese: 屯門公路
- Cantonese Yale: tyun4 mun4 gung1 lou6
- Literal meaning: Tuen Mun public road/ Tuen Mun Highway
Transcriptions
Standard Mandarin
- Hanyu Pinyin: Túnmén Gōnglù
Hakka
- Romanization: Tun2 Mun2 gung1 lu4
Yue: Cantonese
- Yale Romanization: tyun4 mun4 gung1 lou6

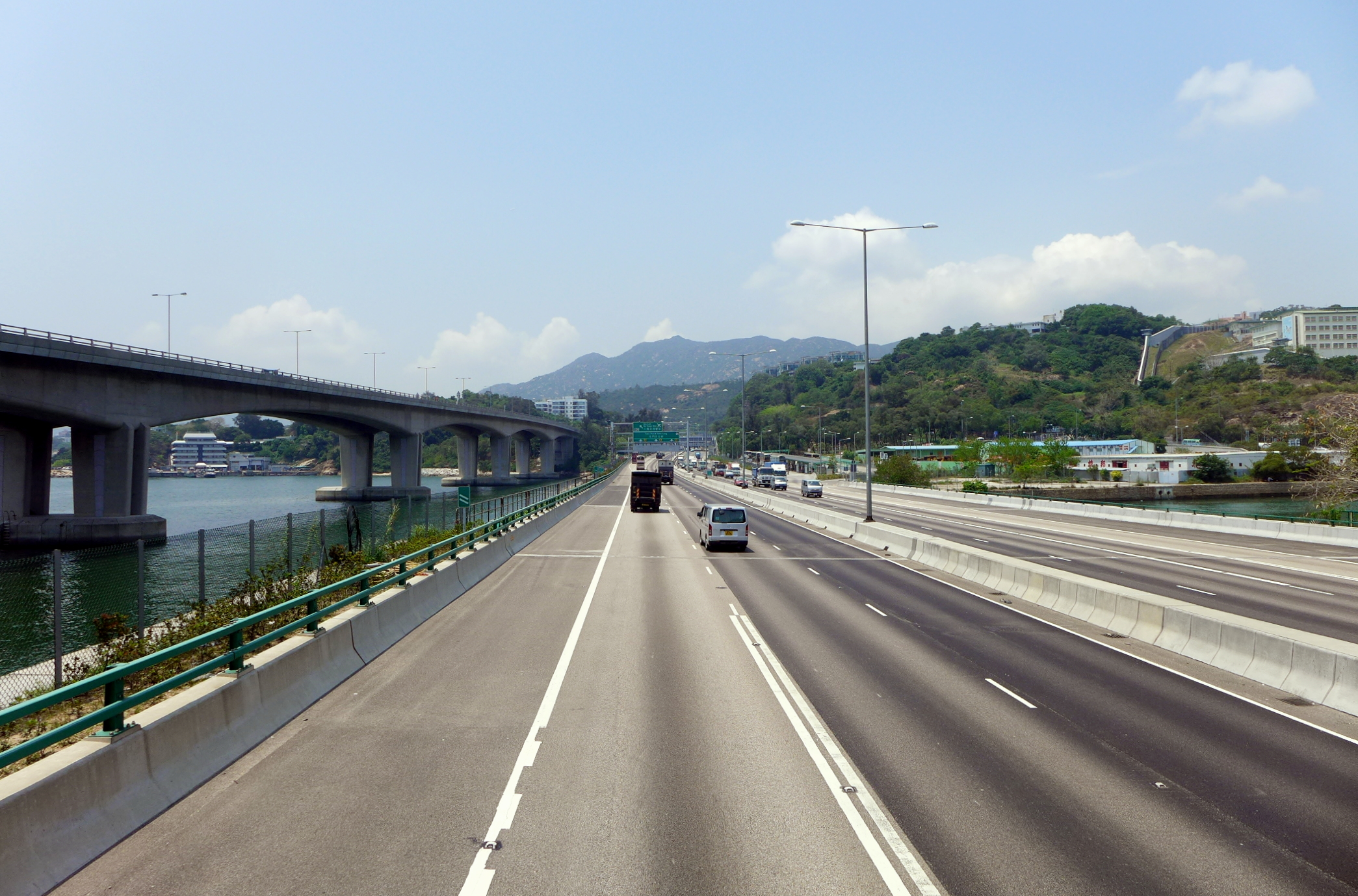
Tuen Mun Road Tai Lam Section in 2015

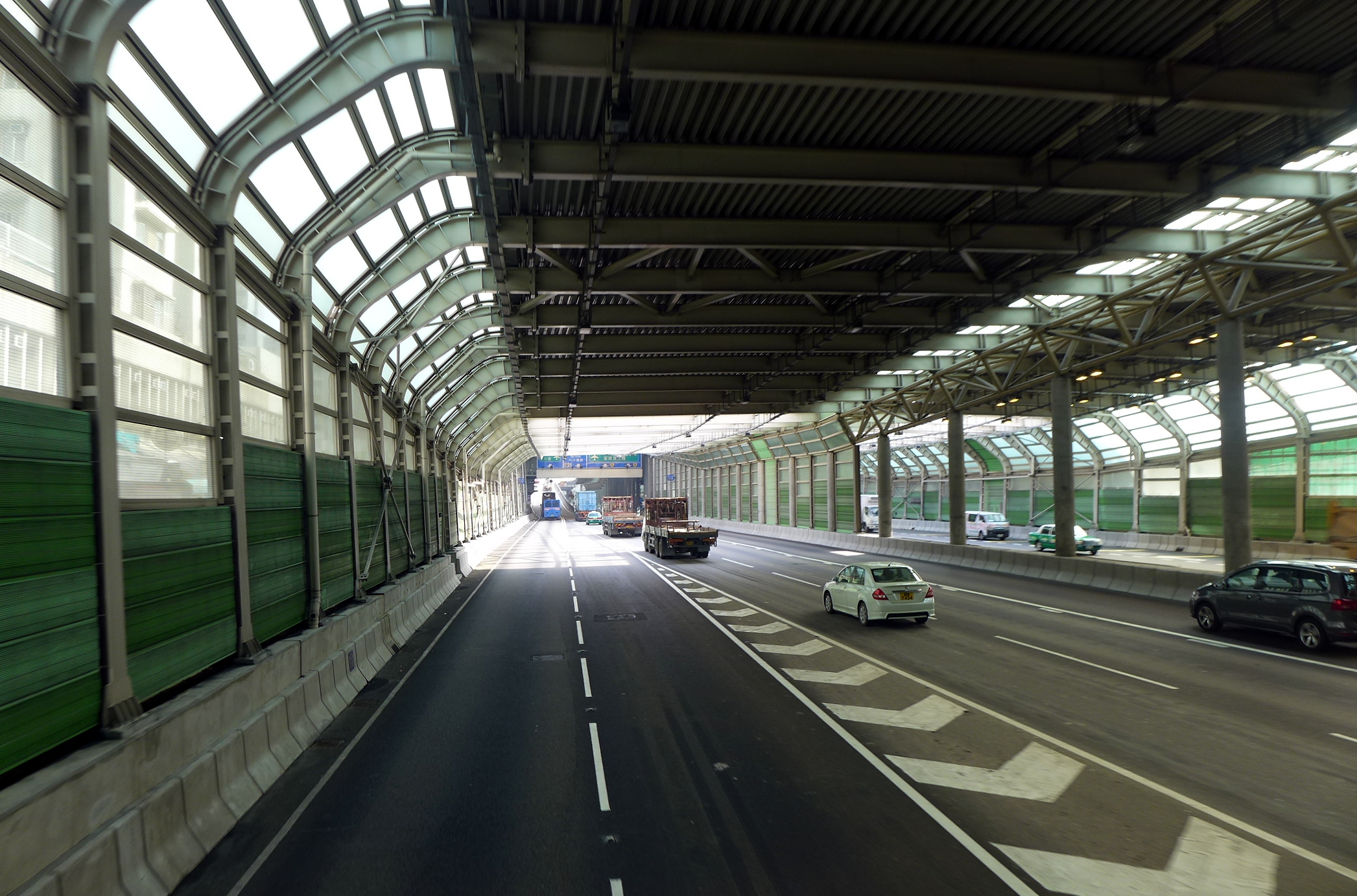
Tuen Mun Road, Tuen Mun Section

Tuen Mun Road (Chinese: 屯門公路; Jyutping: tyun4 mun4 gung1 lou6) is a major expressway in Hong Kong which connects Tuen Mun with Tsuen Wan, within the New Territories. It is part of Hong Kong's Route 9, which circumnavigates the New Territories. Opened in 1978, it was once the major trunk route linking the northwest New Territories to urban Kowloon and is known for its frequent traffic jams and road accidents owing to its early design and heavy usage. As a result, speed limits have been enforced to 70–80 km/h (45–50 mph) due to geometric constraints.

== Alignment ==
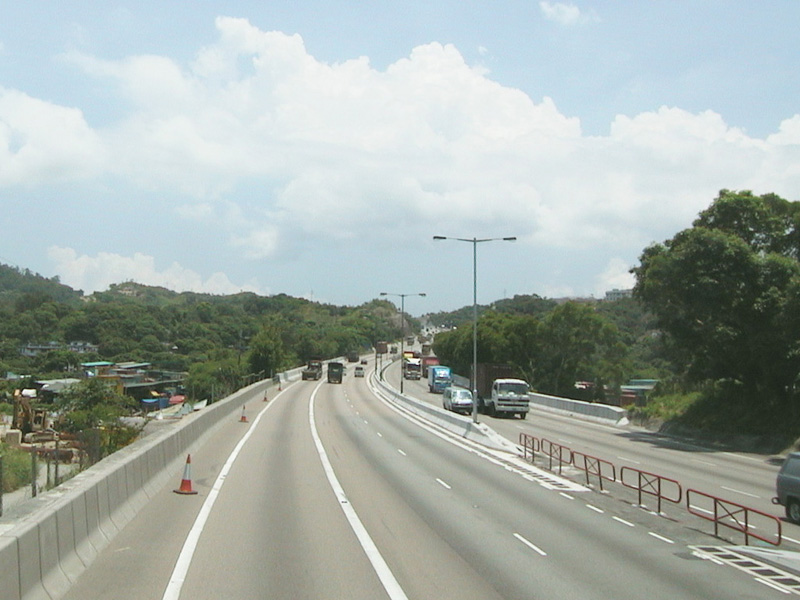
Tuen Mun Road near So Kwun Wat, Tuen Mun in 2005

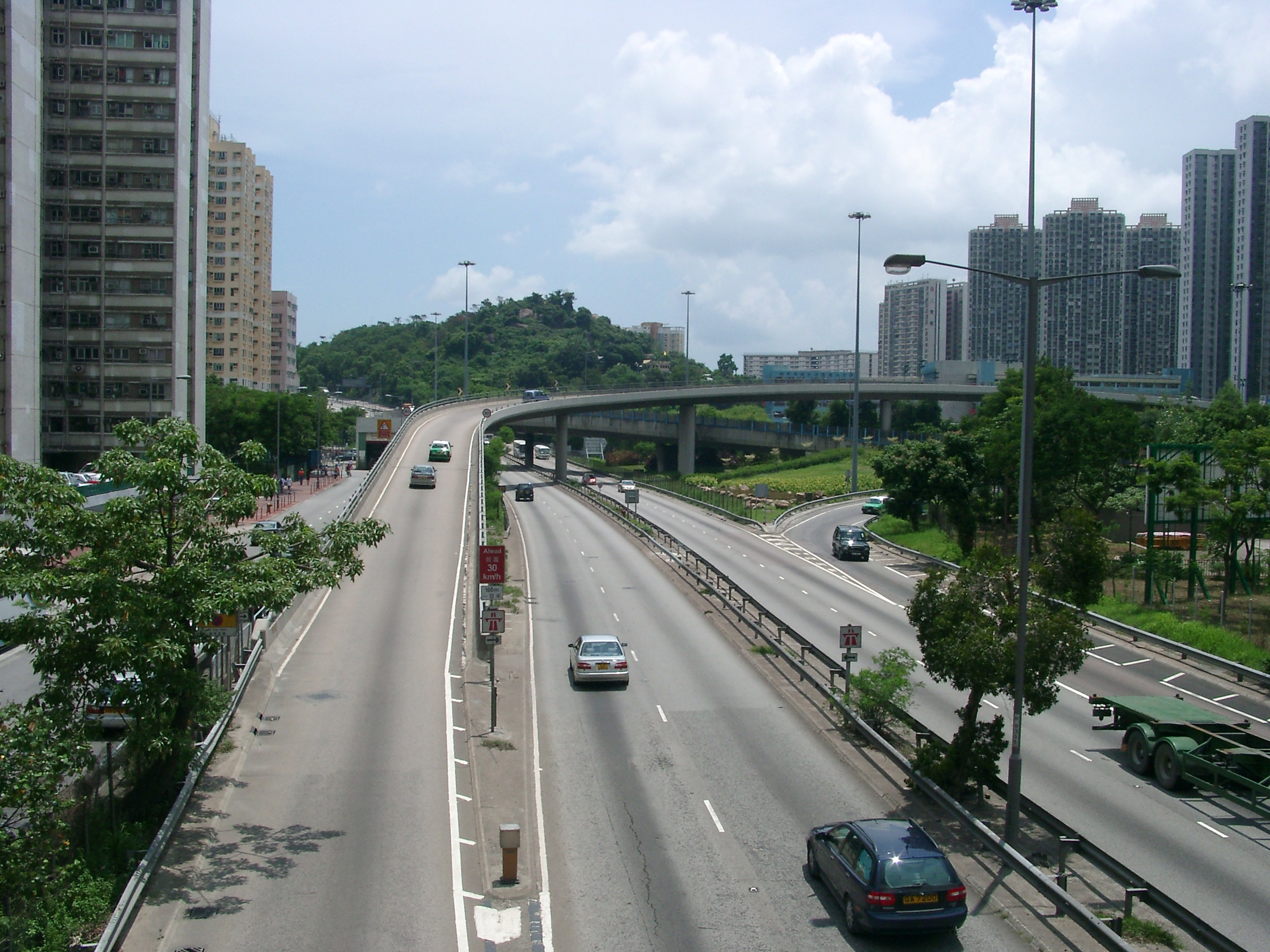
Junction of Tuen Mun Road and Wong Chu Road, Tuen Mun in 2006. Looking south

A time-lapse video of Tuen Mun Road

The highway leads off Yuen Long Highway at Lam Tei Interchange, where it also interchanges with Castle Peak Road and Tsing Lun Road. The next section (considered from west to east) is a dual 3 lane road through the town centre of Tuen Mun, but this section is not a statutorily designated (limited-access) expressway.

Expressway regulations apply from the junction with Wong Chu Road, where it widens to 3 lanes and climbs the hillside beside Sam Shing Hui. It then descends into So Kwun Wat, crossing the rural area on an embankment. The road then rises again before descending into Siu Lam Interchange, where it interchanges with Castle Peak Road.

From here, the highway crosses the mouth of Tai Lam Chung, and starts climbing the hillsides of Tai Lam through split level terraces (the lower one being the Tuen Mun bound carriageway). The two carriageways join before bypassing the village of Tsing Lung Tau to the north. This section of road is constructed upon various deep cuttings and high embankments. Afterwards, the road crosses over the village of Sham Tseng (situated in a valley) to Sham Tseng Interchange, where it interchanges once again with Castle Peak Road.

The road then climbs towards Ting Kau Interchange with its widest section (5+3 lanes). After this junction with Tsing Long Highway, the Highway crosses the valley of Ting Kau with various viaducts, with the Tsuen Wan bound carriageway climbing to meet the split level section into Tsuen Wan. This section is characterised by its tight bends and steep descent eastbound. The two carriageways join as the highway terminates and leads into Cheung Pei Shan Road, with slip roads connecting with Tsuen Wan Road and Castle Peak Road (Tsuen Wan Section).

== Interchanges ==
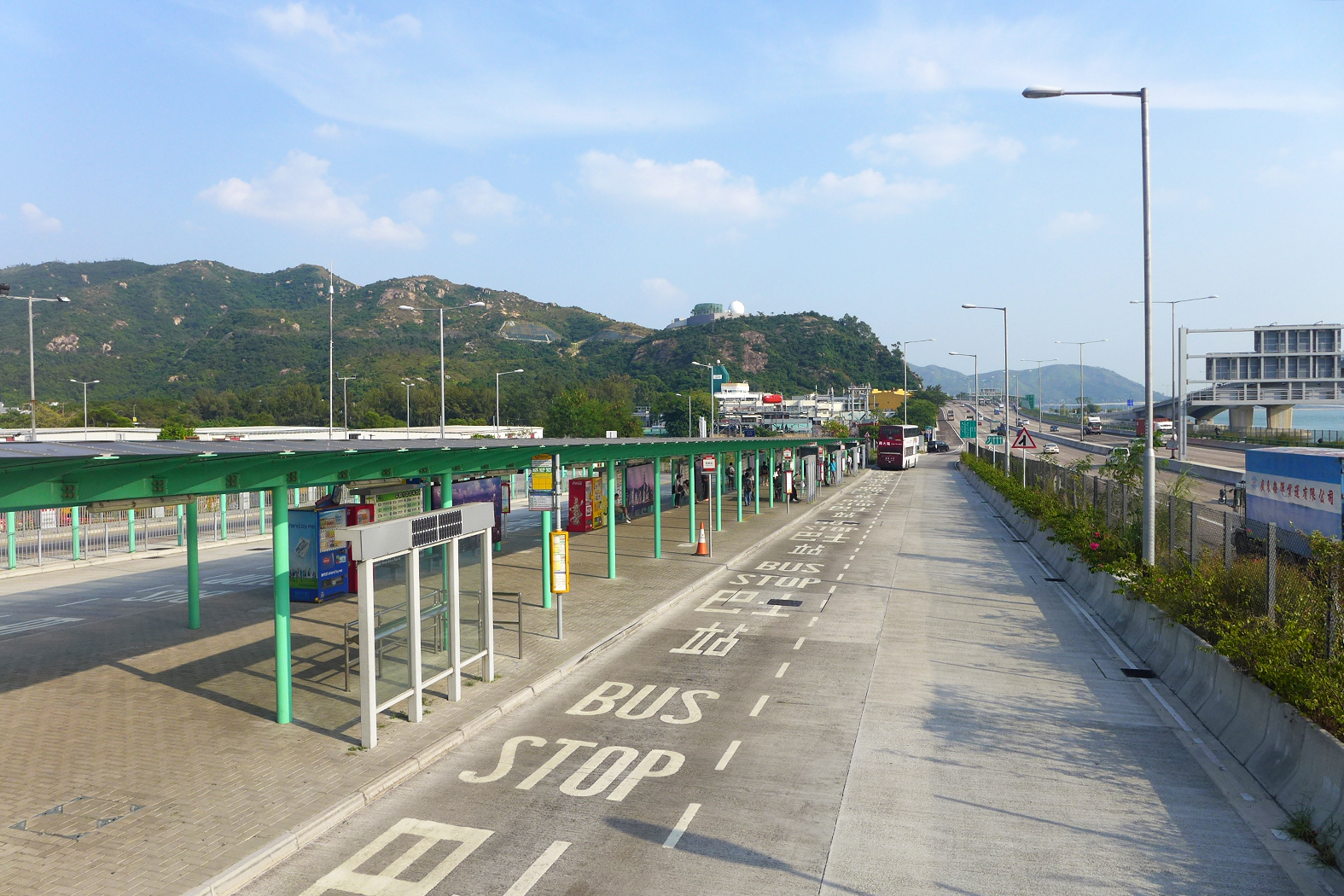
Tuen Mun Road Bus Interchange completed in 2012-13

Tuen Mun Road
Westbound exits	Exit number	Eastbound exits
Lam Tei Interchange continues as Yuen Long Highway
End Tuen Mun Road		Start Tuen Mun Road
Tsing Tin Interchange; Tai Hing; Tsing Tin Road	18	Tsing Tin Interchange; Tai Hing; Tsing Tin Road
San Hui; San Tak Street	19	Tuen Mun Central; Pui To Road
Tuen Mun Central; Tuen Hi Road (service road)	20	Tuen Mun Central; Tuen Fat Road (service road)
Tuen Mun Central, San Hui; Tuen Hing Road	20A	no exit
Butterfly Beach, Tuen Mun West; Wong Chu Road	21	Butterfly Beach, Tuen Mun West; Wong Chu Road
Siu Lam Interchange; Siu Lam; Castle Peak Road – Tai Lam	22	Siu Lam Interchange; Siu Lam; Castle Peak Road – Tai Lam
Sham Tseng Interchange; Sham Tseng, Tsing Lung Tau; Castle Peak Road – Sham Tseng	23	Sam Tseng Interchange; Sham Tseng, Ting Kau; Castle Peak Road – Sham Tseng
Ting Kau Interchange; Yuen Long, Lok Ma Chau; Tai Lam Tunnel	24	Ting Kau Interchange; Lantau, Tsing Yi, Kowloon; Ting Kau Bridge
no exit	24A	Tsing Yi, Kowloon; Tsuen Wan Road
Start Tuen Mun Road		End Tuen Mun Road continues on as Castle Peak Road – Tsuen Wan and Cheung Pei Shan Road

== History and development ==
Tuen Mun Road was one of Hong Kong's first high speed roads, and the first expressway. Its construction proved to be a great challenge for the engineers. The road had to be built along the winding coastline, and the steep terrain encountered required the construction of numerous viaducts, culverts and cuttings. To save construction costs, the road was built with narrow carriageways and substandard geometry, causing frequent traffic accidents and subsequent congestion for a long period, and as a result speed limits were reduced to 70–80 km/h (45–50 mph). Another such measure was putting the construction work into phases.

Phase 1 of the road was built in 1977, being the present day Tsuen Wan-bound carriageway. This section was officially opened on 5 May 1978 by Governor Murray MacLehose. Phase 2, which consists of the Tuen Mun-bound carriageway between Sham Tseng and Tsuen Wan, was opened in 1981; the remaining Tuen Mun-bound carriageway was completed in 1983.

Since the road was opened, there have been various improvements carried out to meet the increasing traffic demand, such as the addition of uphill crawler lanes (Tsuen Wan Bound) at Sam Shing Hui, So Kwun Wat, Tai Lam Chung and Ting Kau. The Highways Department has plans to carry out extensive reconstruction works on Tuen Mun Road that will include widening traffic lanes, improving horizontal curvatures and sightlines, and the installation of noise barriers. These works commenced in October 2008 and completed at the end of 2015.

Tuen Mun Road remains one of the most heavily used roads in Hong Kong, as some drivers heading to Yuen Long shunpike Tai Lam Tunnel, and container trucks use it to access the River Trade Terminal in Tuen Mun.

To enhance the convenience of communicators travelling from New Territories to Kowloon or Hong Kong Island, Tuen Mun Road Bus-Bus Interchange had been under construction since 15 July 2010. The interchange on Kowloon bound side and that on Tuen Mun bound side were commissioned on 26 December 2012 and 27 July 2013 respectively.

== Major incidents ==
=== Bus accident near Ting Kau ===
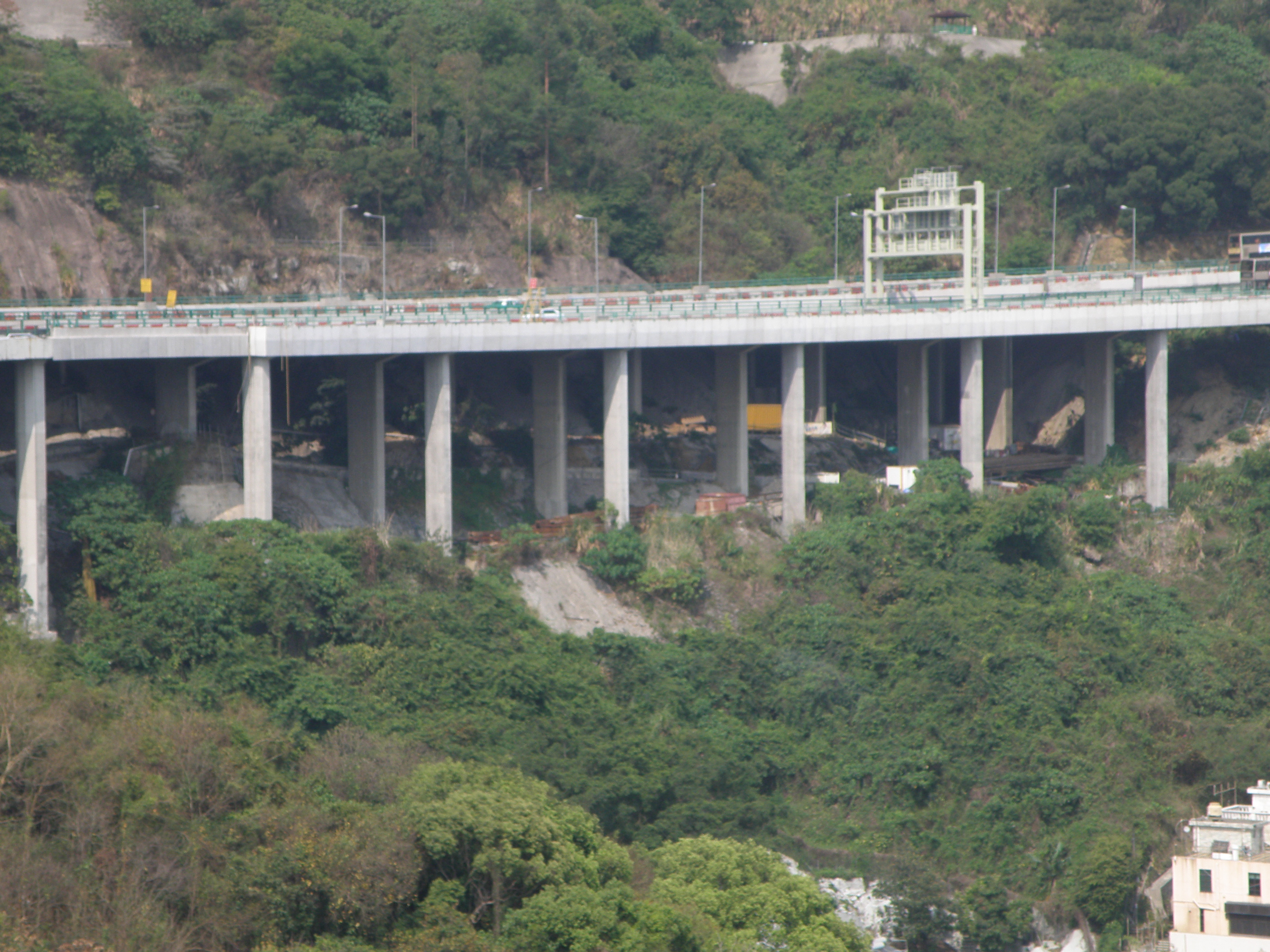
Accident site

In the morning of 10 July 2003, a Neoplan Centroliner bus was running on route 265M of Kowloon Motor Bus (KMB) towards Tin Shui Wai, Yuen Long. A lorry running in the middle lane lost control as the bus approached the junction with Tsing Long Highway. The two vehicles collided, knocking the bus towards the side of the viaduct. The bus broke through the parapet, and plunged into Ting Kau Village 35 metres (115 ft) below, resulting in 21 deaths (including the driver) and 20 injured.

Rescue operations were described as being the most challenging encountered by the fire services since the fire at Garley Building. This was due to the constraints at the site (a rural village sited on a steep hillside with no direct road access), and the sheer volume of severely wounded casualties.

The bus was later lifted back onto Tuen Mun Road and transported to the vehicle compound at Siu Ho Wan. It was however written off.

After the incident, then-Chief Executive Tung Chee Hwa visited the crash scene and pledged that the government would do all that it could to aid the survivors, to investigate the accident and prevent similar accidents from ever happening again.

The lorry driver was sentenced to 18 months in jail after being found guilty of causing death by dangerous driving. At the time, it was the most serious road accident in Hong Kong history. He later appealed the rulings, which were subsequently overturned. Tests have shown that the vehicle he was driving was defective (tending to veer to the side when braking), and he was then found guilty of a lesser charge, careless driving, and his sentence was shortened to five months and a two-year driving ban.

=== Tyre burst incident near Yau Kom Tau ===
On 1 December 2013, a screw that protruded out of the road surface caused the tyres of about 50 heavy vehicles, of which 36 were KMB buses, to burst. The incident caused a 3-hour traffic jam and a partial closure of the road. Hundreds of passengers were affected but no one was injured in the incident.

== See also ==
- List of streets and roads in Hong Kong

Preceded by Yuen Long Highway	Hong Kong Route 9 Tuen Mun Road	Succeeded by Cheung Pei Shan Road
