= Wo Yi Hop =

Village in Hong Kong

Coordinates: 22.382872°N 114.139214°E

Wo Yi Hop (Chinese: 和宜合) is a village and an area in Shing Mun Valley, Tsuen Wan District, Hong Kong.

== Administration ==
Wo Yi Hop is a recognized village under the New Territories Small House Policy. It is one of the villages represented within the Tsuen Wan Rural Committee. For electoral purposes, Wo Yi Hop is part of the Shek Wai Kok constituency, which is currently represented by Man Yu-ming.

== Education ==
Wo Yi Hop is in Primary One Admission (POA) School Net 64, which includes multiple aided schools (schools operated independently of the government but funded with government money); none of the schools in the net are government schools.
