= Castle Peak Road =

Road in New Territories, Hong Kong

- 青山公路

Route information
- Length: 51.5 km (32.0 mi)
- Existed: 1920–present

Major junctions
- South end: Tai Po Road at Sham Shui Po
- Cheung Sha Wan Road at Cheung Sha Wan; Route 7 and Route 8 at Lai Chi Kok; Kwai Chung Road at Kwai Hing; Texaco Road at Tai Wo Hau; Route 9 at Tsuen Wan; Route 9 at Lam Tei; Route 9 at Tai Lam; Route 9 at Yuen Long; Kam Tin Road at Au Tau; Route 9/San Sham Road at Chau Tau; Route 9 at Pak Shek Au
- North end: Fan Kam Road at Sheung Shui

Location
- Country: China
- Special administrative region: Hong Kong

Highway system
- Transport in Hong Kong; Routes; Roads and Streets

Castle Peak Road (Kowloon portion)
- Chinese: 青山道
Transcriptions
Standard Mandarin
- Hanyu Pinyin: Qīngshān Dào
Hakka
- Romanization: ciang1 san1 tau4
Yue: Cantonese
- Yale Romanization: ching1 saan1 dou6
- Jyutping: cing1 saan1 dou6

Castle Peak Road (New Territories portion)
- Chinese: 青山公路
Transcriptions
Standard Mandarin
- Hanyu Pinyin: Qīngshān Gōnglù
Hakka
- Romanization: ciang1 san1 gung1 lu4
Yue: Cantonese
- Yale Romanization: ching1 saan1 gung1 lou6
- Jyutping: cing1 saan1 gung1 lou6

Castle Peak Road (Chinese: 青山公路; Jyutping: cing1 saan1 gung1 lou6) is the longest road in Hong Kong. Completed in 1920, it has the approximate shape of an arc of a semi-circle. It runs west from Tai Po Road in Sham Shui Po, New Kowloon, to Tuen Mun, then north to Yuen Long and east to Sheung Shui, in the very north of the New Territories; it is divided into 22 sections.

== Name ==
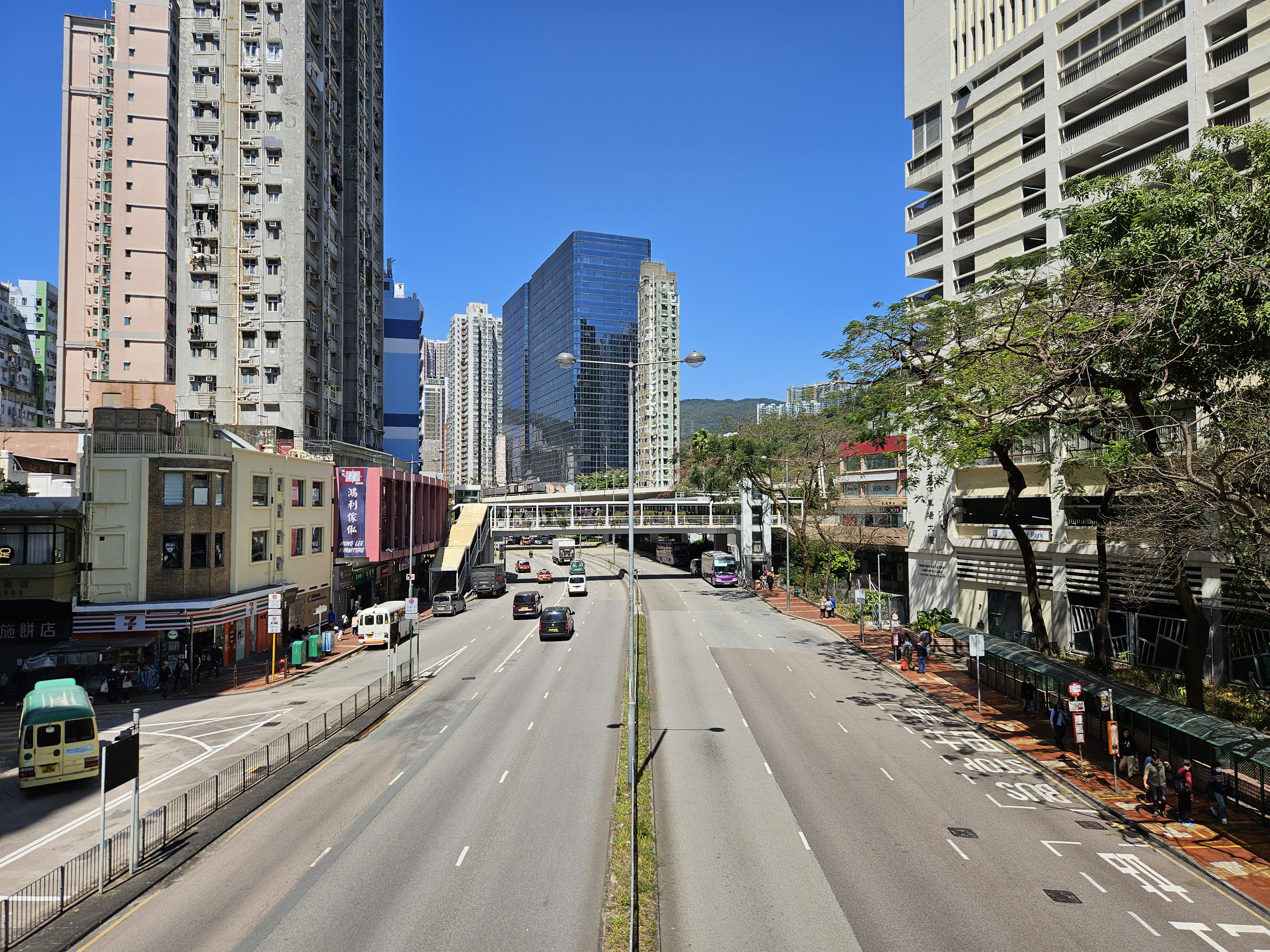
Castle Peak Road in Tsuen Wan

The road was named after Castle Peak, a mountain in the western New Territories; the area to the east of the peak was hence named Castle Peak and later given its old name of Tuen Mun.

The road was originally known in Chinese as Tsing Shan To (青山道) for its entire length. The Chinese name of the section of the road in the New Territories was later changed to Tsing Shan Kung Lo (青山公路; lit. "castle peak public road", or "castle peak highway"). In everyday conversation, however, the term Tsing Shan To survives for the stretches within Tsuen Wan and Yuen Long.

== History ==
The road was constructed soon after the British leased the New Territories in 1898. Speaking in the Legislative Council in 1909, Governor Frederick Lugard cited the facilitation of trade and police control as reasons for the road's construction. It was built and gradually widened in sections.

== Route ==
=== New Kowloon ===
The road starts east at Tai Po Road in Sham Shui Po and passes through Cheung Sha Wan and Lai Chi Kok in New Kowloon. On both sides of the road are old residential blocks, with some dated back to pre-World War II. Towards Lai Chi Kok, it is surrounded by industrial buildings instead. The road is one-way eastbound between Kom Tsun Street & its terminus at Tai Po Road.

=== New Territories ===
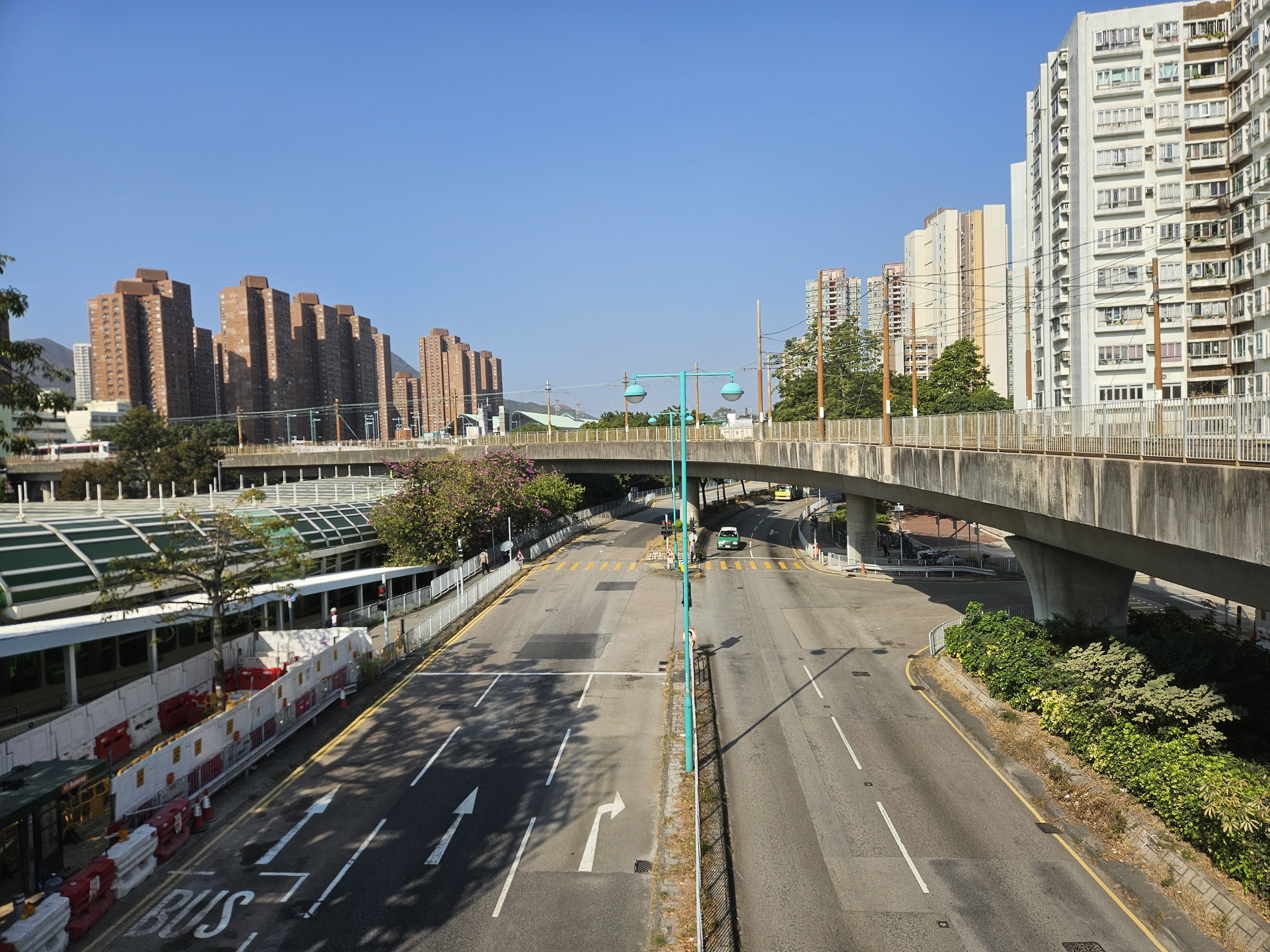
Castle Peak Road near Fung Tei stop, Tuen Mun

After leaving New Kowloon, it goes uphill past Kau Wa Keng and Tai Ching Cheung along a four-lane expressway to Kwai Chung and downhill into Tsuen Wan. The stretch within Tsuen Wan is also commonly called "main road" (大馬路), especially among the older generations.

Next, it goes along the south shore of the Western New Territories, via Yau Kom Tau, Ting Kau, Sham Tseng, Tsing Lung Tau, Tai Lam, Siu Lam and So Kwun Wat and then reaches the Tuen Mun New Town, which was also known as Castle Peak (after which the road was named). Much of this stretch was bypassed by Tuen Mun Road between 1977 and 1983. This section is popular with cyclists as it links Tuen Mun and Tsuen Wan.

It continues north-east as a six-laned road, paralleling the Light Rail through Lam Tei, Hung Shui Kiu, Ping Shan and goes through another new town, Yuen Long New Town. The section within Yuen Long, again, is also commonly called "main road" (大馬路). This section was bypassed by the Yuen Long Highway in 1992.

It then turns north at Au Tau, just west of Kam Tin. This section is paralleled by San Tin Highway, constructed between 1991 and 1993. It then passes through Mai Po, San Tin, Lok Ma Chau (near the Chinese border), Pak Shek Au and Kwu Tung before terminating at Fan Kam Road in Sheung Shui.

== See also ==
- Hoh Fuk Tong Centre
- List of streets and roads in Hong Kong
