= Tsuen Wan Rural Committee =

- Traditional Chinese: 荃灣鄉事委員會
- Simplified Chinese: 荃湾乡事委员会
Transcriptions
Standard Mandarin
- Hanyu Pinyin: Quánwān Xiāng Shì Wěiyuánhuì
Yue: Cantonese
- Jyutping: cyun4 waan1 hoeng1 si6 wai2 jyun4 wui6*2

Tsuen Wan Rural Committee

Tsuen Wan Rural Committee (荃灣鄉事委員會) is a rural committee representing the interest of villages in Tsuen Wan and Kwai Chung, Hong Kong.

Note that Tsing Yi Island and Ma Wan has its own rural committees, Tsing Yi Rural Committee and Ma Wan Rural Committee respectively.

== Villages ==
The villages represented within Tsuen Wan Rural Committee are:

- Chuen Lung
- Chung Kwai Chung
- Ha Fa Shan
- Ham Tin
- Ho Pui
- Hoi Pa (Cheung Pei Shan Road)
- Hoi Pa (South Platform)
- Hoi Pa (Wo Yi Hop Road and Kwok Shui Road)
- Kwan Mun Hau
- Kwu Hang
- Lo Wai
- Ma Sim Pai
- Muk Min Ha
- Pai Min Kok
- Pak Tin Pa
- Sai Lau Kok
- Sam Tung Uk
- San Tsuen
- Sham Tseng
- Shek Pik San Tsuen
- Shek Wai Kok
- Sheung Kwai Chung
- Tai Uk Wai
- Ting Kau
- Tsing Fai Tong
- Tsing Lung Tau
- Tsuen Wan Sam Tsuen
- Wo Yi Hop
- Yau Kam Tau
- Yeung Uk
- Yi Pei Chun
- Yuen Tun
