= Kwan Mun Hau Tsuen =

Village in Tai Wo Hau, Tsuen Wan, Hong Kong

Coordinates: 22.371899°N 114.12405°E

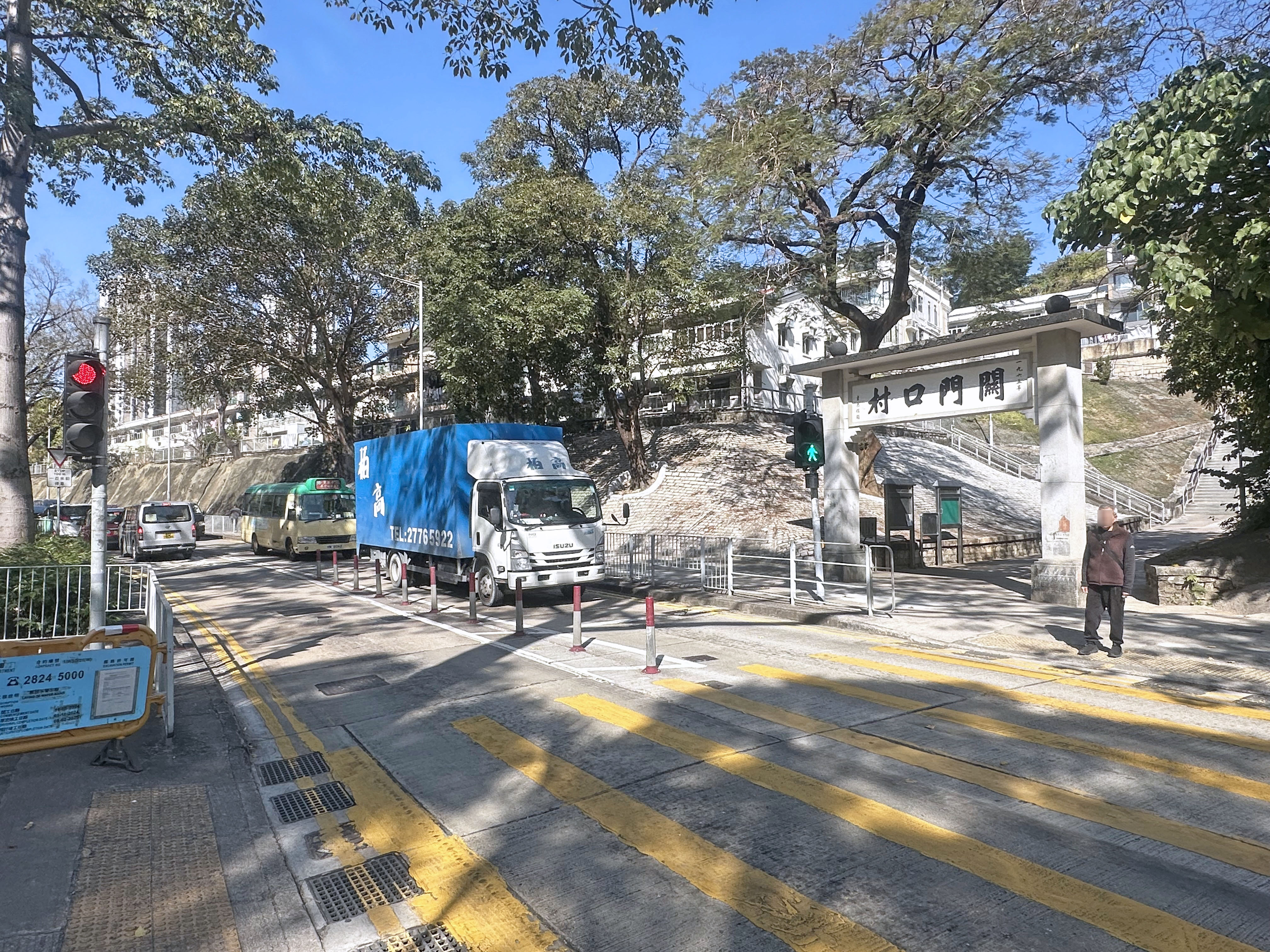
Entrance gate of Kwan Mun Hau Tsuen along Kwok Shui Road

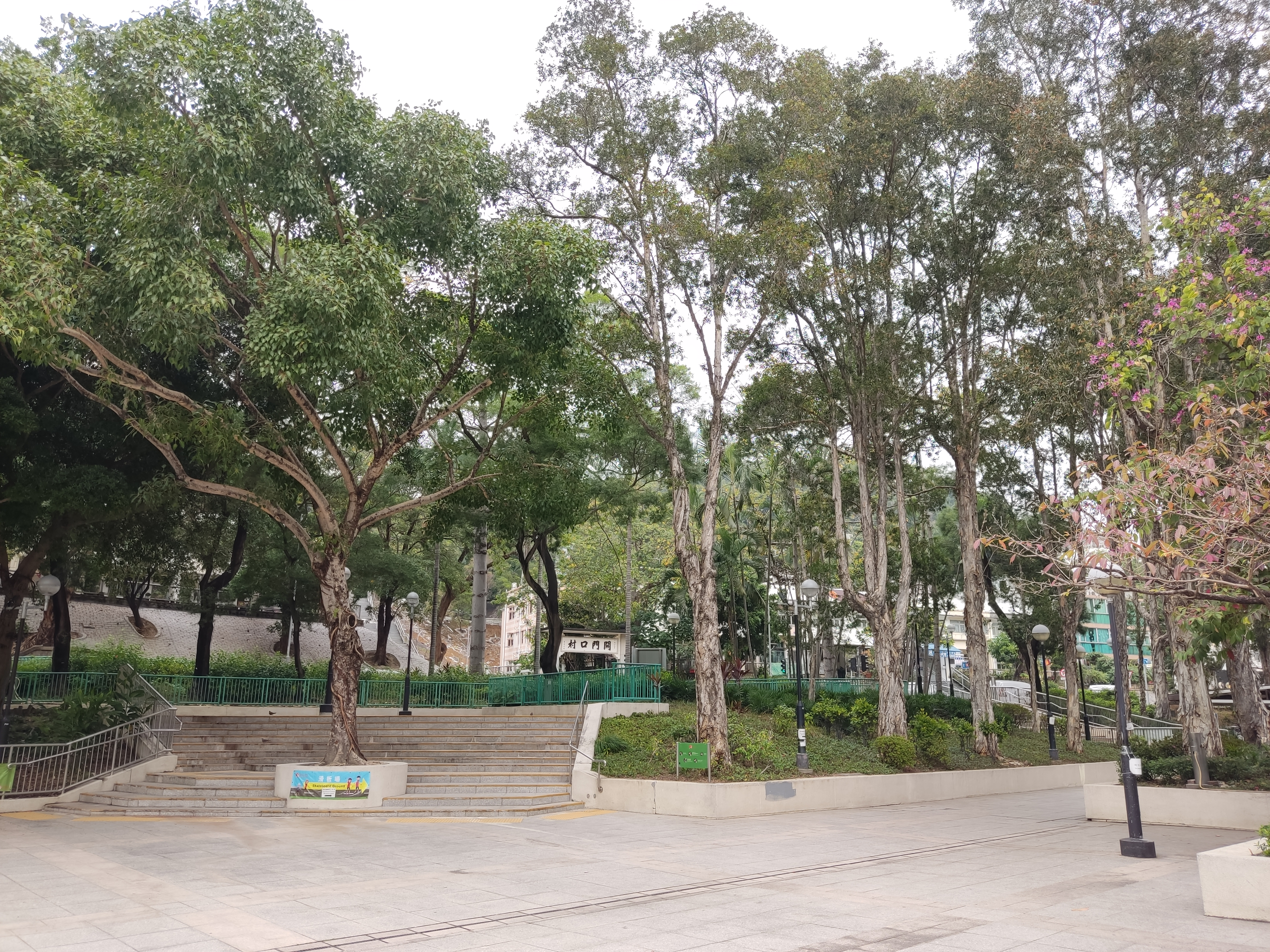
View of Kwan Mun Hau Tsuen across Kwok Shui Road Park (國瑞路公園).

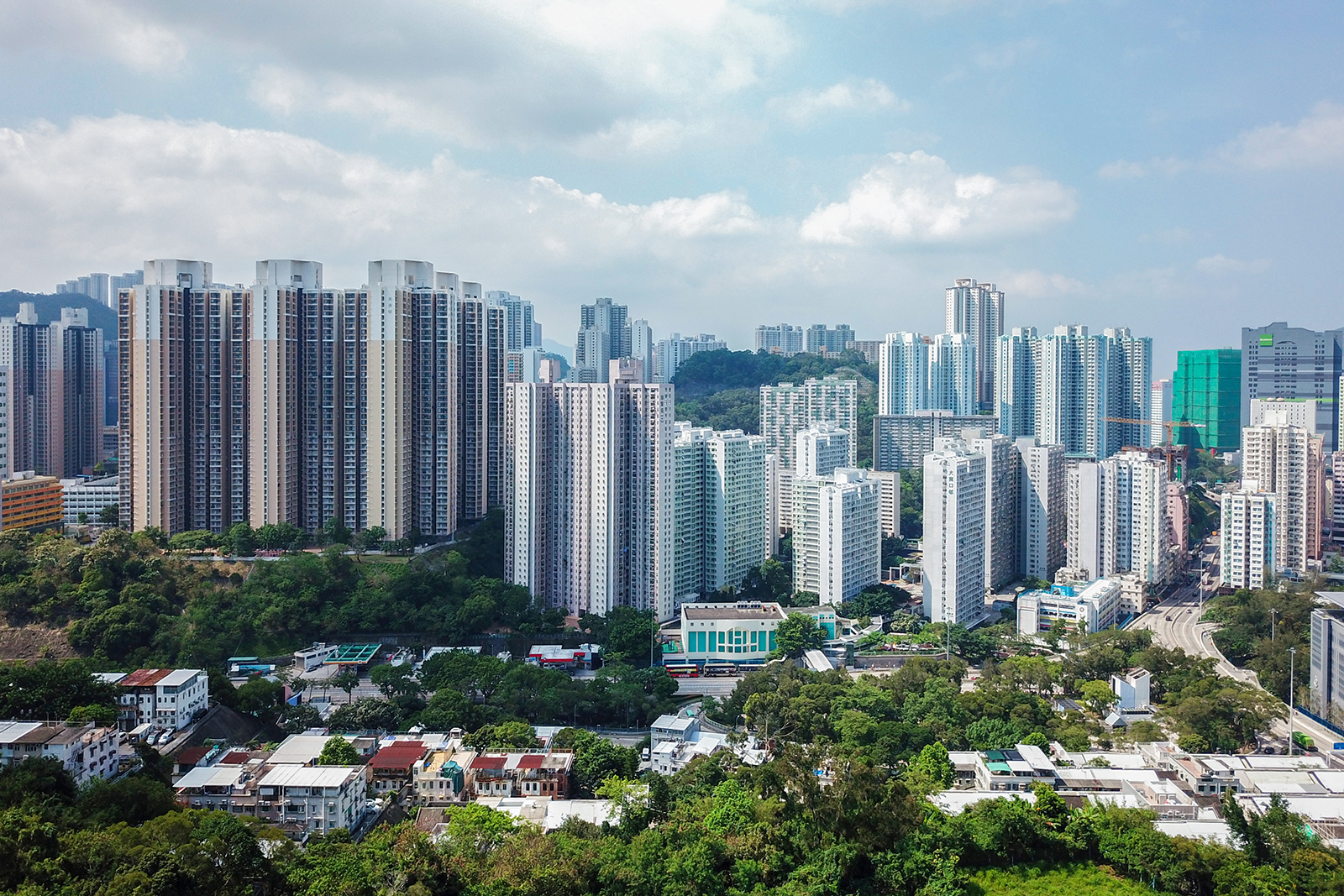
View of Tai Wo Hau, with the villages of Ham Tin Tsuen, Hoi Pa San Tsuen, Ho Pui Tsuen, Yeung Uk Tsuen and Kwan Mun Hau Tsuen in the foreground.

Kwan Mun Hau Tsuen (Chinese: 關門口村) or Kwan Mun Hau New Village is a village in the Tai Wo Hau area of Tsuen Wan District, Hong Kong.

== Administration ==
Kwan Mun Hau New Village is a recognized village under the New Territories Small House Policy.

== History ==
Kwan Mun Hau Tsuen, like the nearby villages of Ho Pui Tsuen and Yeung Uk Tsuen, is a resite village.

As the consequence of the development of Tsuen Wan into a new town in 1965-1966, Kwan Mun Hau village, Ho Bui Village and Yeung Uk Village were relocated to the Tai Wo Hau area. Because of land shortage, some villagers had to move to the land near the then new Yau Kam Tau Village, and formed a new village called Tsuen Wan Sam Tsuen.

== See also ==
- Tai Wo Hau station
