= Tsuen Wan Sam Tsuen =

Coordinates: 22.372427°N 114.097242°E

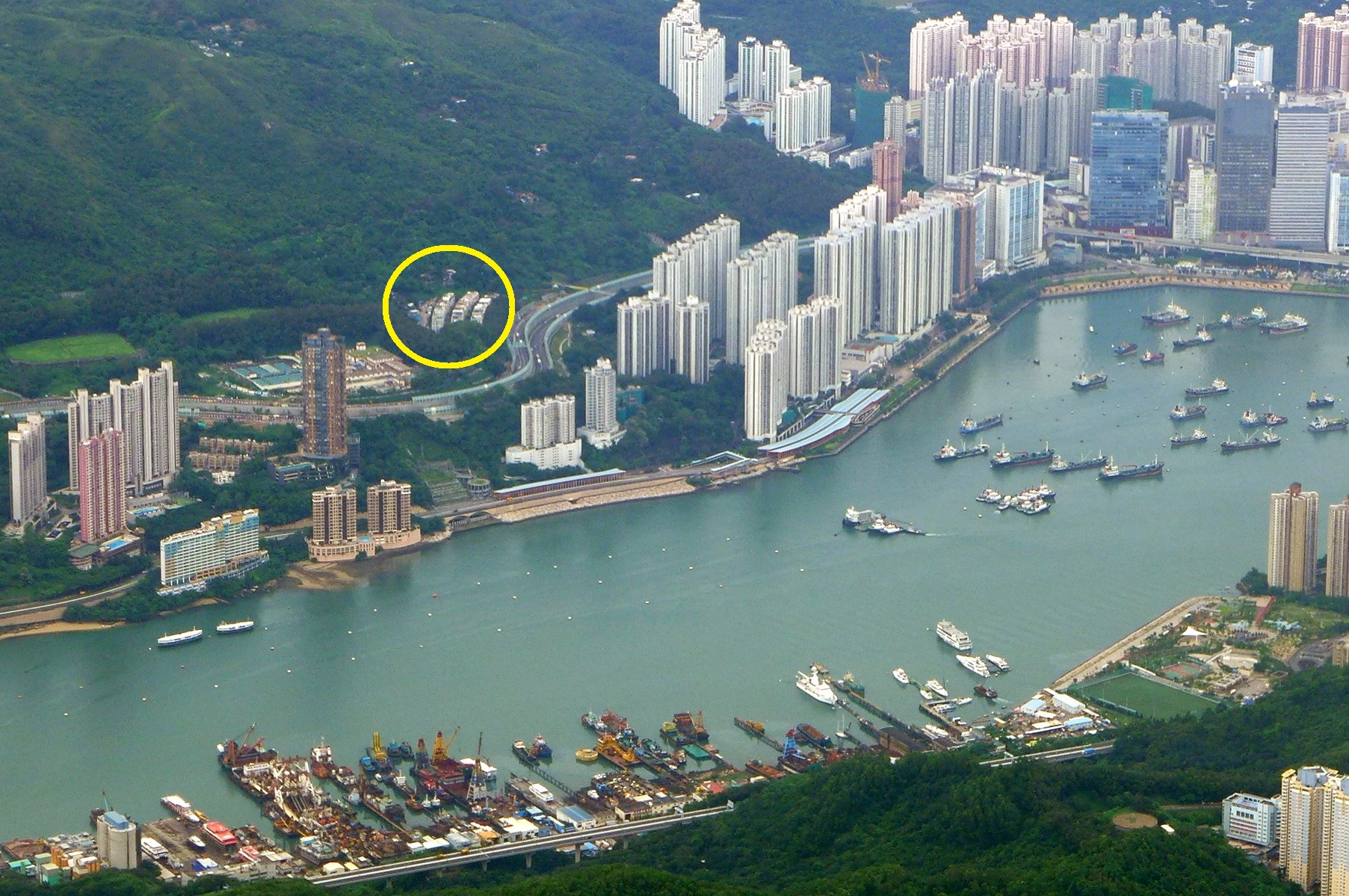
Aerial photograph showing the location of Yau Kom Tau Village and Tsuen Wan Sam Tsuen.

Tsuen Wan Sam Tsuen (Chinese: 荃灣三村; lit. 'three villages of Tsuen Wan') is a village located in the Yau Kom Tau area, west of Tsuen Wan, in Tsuen Wan District, Hong Kong. It lies directly to the east of Yau Kom Tau Village.

== Administration ==
Tsuen Wan Sam Tsuen is one of the villages represented within the Tsuen Wan Rural Committee.

== History ==
As the consequence of the development of Tsuen Wan into a new town in 1965-1966, Kwan Mun Hau village, Ho Bui Village and Yeung Uk Village were relocated to the Tai Wo Hau area. Because of land shortage, some villagers had to move to the land near the then new Yau Kam Tau Village, and formed a new village called 'Tsuen Wan Sam Tsuen'.
