= Ham Tin (disambiguation) =

Ham Tin (Chinese: 鹹田; lit. 'salty field') is the name of several places in Hong Kong, including:

- Ham Tin (鹹田), a village in Pui O, Lantau Island
- Ham Tin (鹹田), a village facing Tai Long Wan, Sai Kung District
- Ham Tin Tsuen (鹹田村), a village in Tai Wo Hau, Kwai Chung

It is also part of the name of:

- Ham Tin Shan (鹹田山), the former name of Lam Tin
