= San Tsuen (disambiguation) =

San Tsuen (Chinese: 新村; lit. 'new village') is the name or part of the name of several places in Hong Kong:

- San Tsuen in Sha Tau Kok
- San Tsuen (Tsuen Wan District), a village in Tsuen Wan District

Other places include:

- Ha Mei San Tsuen
- Kam Tin Shing Mun San Tsuen
- Lam Tsuen San Tsuen
- Pan Chung San Tsuen
- Ping Shan San Tsuen
- Shui Tsiu San Tsuen
- Tai O San Tsuen, part of Tai O, Lantau Island
