= Yeung Uk Tsuen, Tsuen Wan District =

Village in Tai Wo Hau, Hong Kong

Coordinates: 22.37187°N 114.125682°E

Yeung Uk Tsuen (Chinese: 楊屋村) or Yeung Uk New Village is a village in the Tai Wo Hau area of Tsuen Wan District, Hong Kong.

== Administration ==
Yeung Uk New Village is a recognized village under the New Territories Small House Policy.

== History ==
Yeung Uk Tsuen, like the nearby villages of Ho Pui Tsuen and Kwan Mun Hau Tsuen, is a resite village.

As the consequence of the development of Tsuen Wan into a new town in 1965-1966, Kwan Mun Hau village, Ho Bui Village and Yeung Uk Village were relocated to the Tai Wo Hau area. Because of land shortage, some villagers had to move to the land near the then new Yau Kam Tau Village, and formed a new village called Tsuen Wan Sam Tsuen.
