= Yau Kom Tau (Tsuen Wan District) =

Area of the New Territories, Hong Kong

Coordinates: 22°22′13″N 114°05′31″E

- Traditional Chinese: 油柑頭
- Simplified Chinese: 油柑头
Transcriptions
Standard Mandarin
- Hanyu Pinyin: Yóu Gān Tóu
Yue: Cantonese
- Jyutping: jau4 gam1 tau4

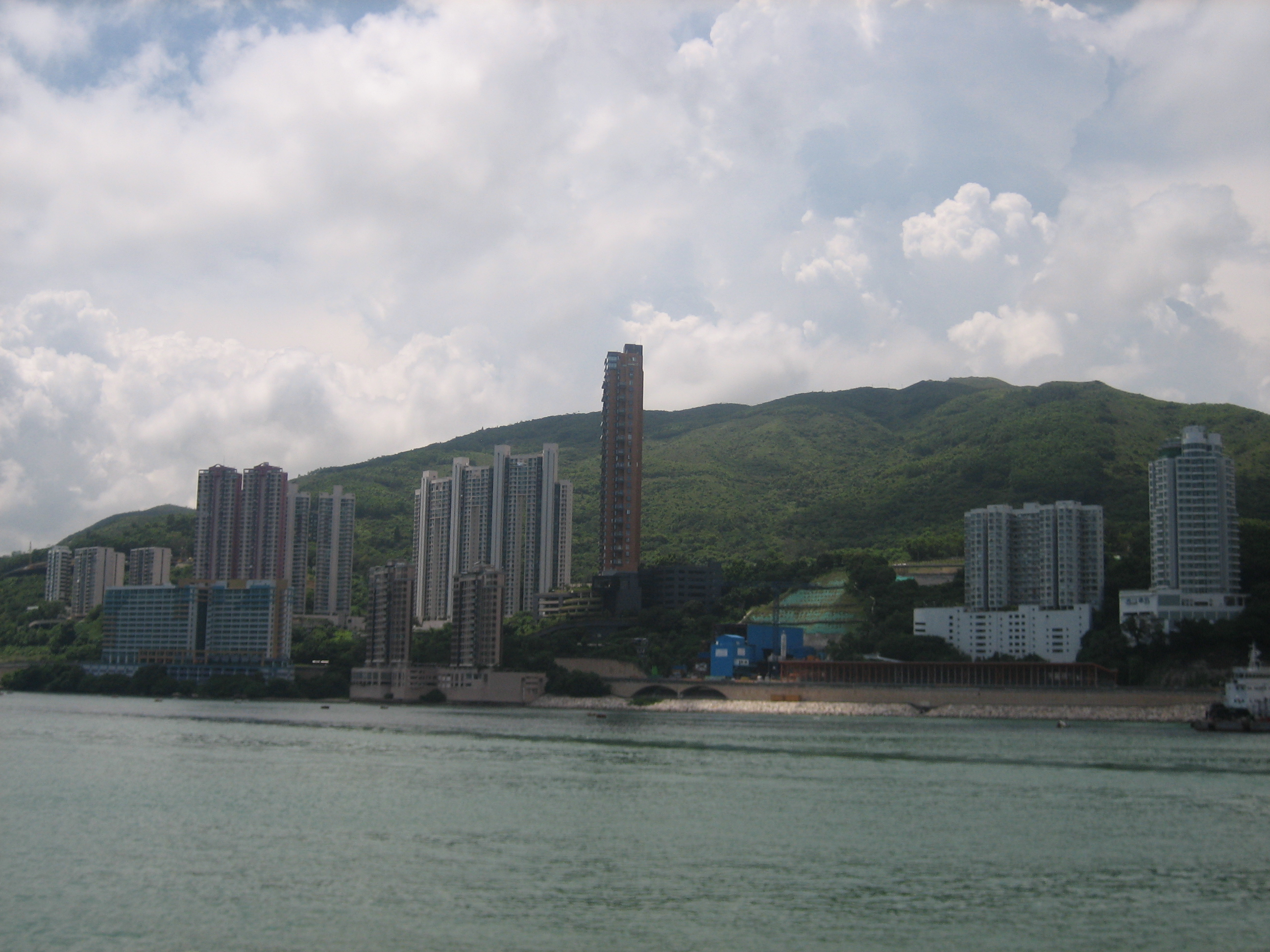
Yau Kom Tau.

Yau Kom Tau, sometimes transliterated as Yau Kam Tau (油柑頭; Cantonese Yale: yàuh gām tàuh) is an area in the Tsuen Wan District of Hong Kong.

Yau Kom Tau Village and Tsuen Wan Sam Tsuen are located in this area.

== Education ==
Yau Kom Tau is in Primary One Admission (POA) School Net 62, which includes schools in Tsuen Wan and areas nearby. The net includes multiple aided schools and one government school, Hoi Pa Street Government Primary School.

== See also ==
- Approach Beach
- Castle Peak Road
- The Westminster Terrace
- Tsuen Wan West
- Yau Kom Tau (disambiguation)
