= Yuen Tuen New Village =

Coordinates: 22.362818°N 114.046242°E

Yuen Tuen New Village (Chinese: 圓墩村) or Yuen Tuen New Village (圓墪新村) is a village in the Tsuen Wan District of Hong Kong.

== Administration ==
Yuen Tuen New Village is a recognized village under the New Territories Small House Policy.
