= Tai Wo Hau station =

MTR station in the New Territories, Hong Kong

Tai Wo Hau 大窩口
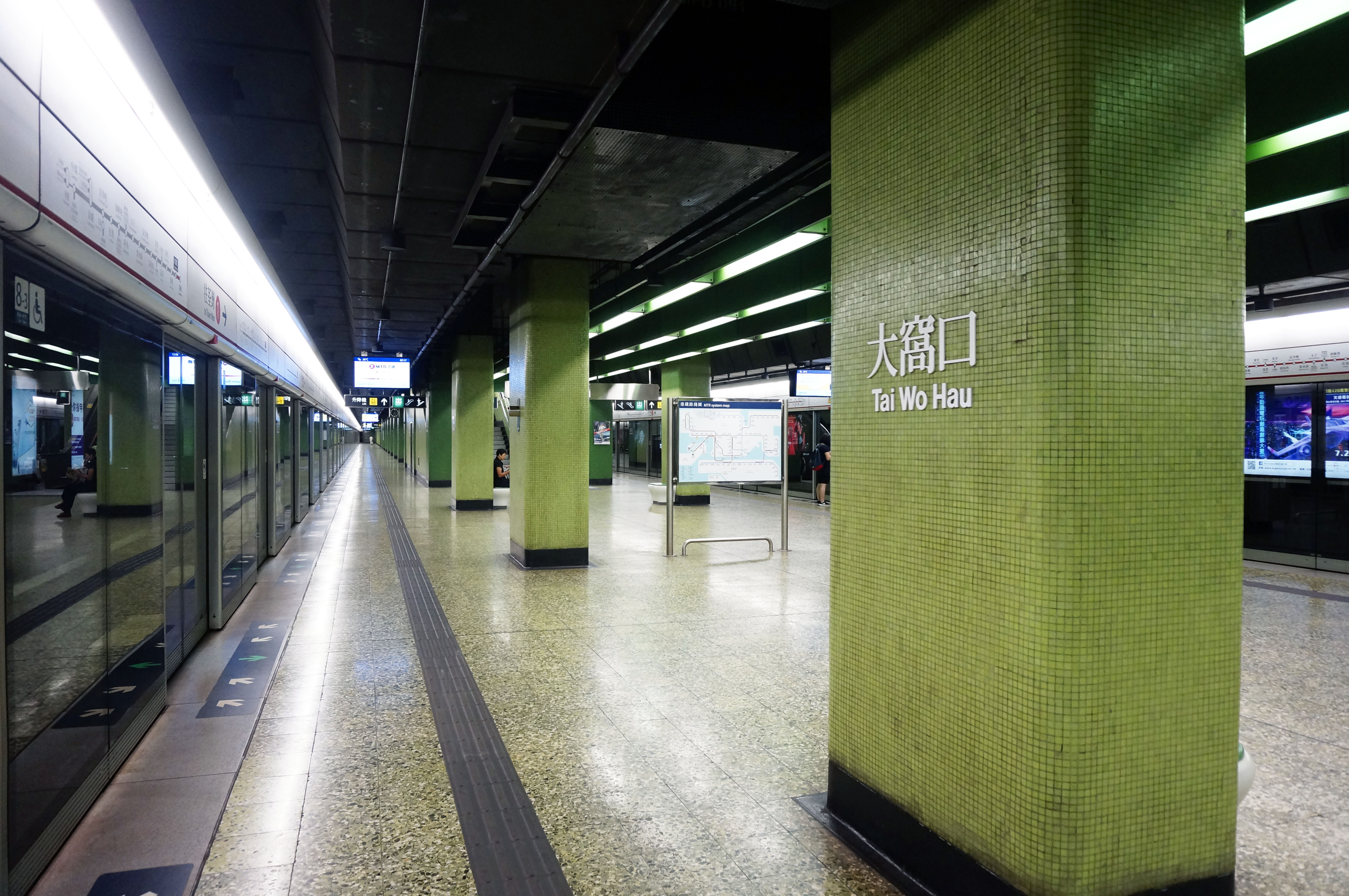
- Platform level of Tai Wo Hau station in July 2017

Chinese name
- Traditional Chinese: 大窩口
- Simplified Chinese: 大窝口
- Hanyu Pinyin: Dàwōkǒu
- Cantonese Yale: Daaihwōháu
- Literal meaning: Great Nest Mouth
Transcriptions
Standard Mandarin
- Hanyu Pinyin: Dàwōkǒu
Yue: Cantonese
- Yale Romanization: Daaihwōháu
- IPA: [tàːi̯.wɔ́ː.hɐ̌u̯]
- Jyutping: Daai6wo1hau2

General information
- Location: Kwok Shui Road Park, Castle Peak Road — Kwai Chung, Tai Wo Hau; Tsuen Wan District, Hong Kong
- Coordinates: 22°22′15″N 114°07′30″E
- System: MTR rapid transit station
- Operator: MTR Corporation
- Line: Tsuen Wan line
- Platforms: 2 (1 island platform)
- Tracks: 2
- Connections: Bus, minibus

Construction
- Structure type: Underground
- Platform levels: 1
- Accessible: yes

Other information
- Station code: TWH

History
- Opened: 10 May 1982; 44 years ago

Services
Preceding station	MTR	Following station
Kwai Hing towards Central	Tsuen Wan line	Tsuen Wan Terminus
Track layout
Location
- Location within MTR

Tai Wo Hau (Chinese: 大窩口; Cantonese Yale: Daaih wō háu) is an MTR station between Tsuen Wan and Kwai Hing stations on the Tsuen Wan line. It serves the areas of Kwai Yin Court and Tai Wo Hau Estate in the Kwai Tsing District, and some resited villages (such as Kwan Mun Hau Tsuen) in the Tsuen Wan District of Hong Kong. These villages were originally in Tsuen Wan town centre, being moved for new town development. Its livery is lime green.

Tai Wo Hau station was one of the first railway stations in the New Territories; and the first underground one. All other New Territories stations on the Tsuen Wan line are either at surface level or on viaducts. Lai King station cuts through a hillside slope, and all other New Territories underground stations were opened some years later.

The station is relatively less busy in the system because of its distance to nearby bus stops and settlements.

== History ==
The station was built on the site of a park. The 280-metre-long, 22-metre-wide, 15-metre-deep station box was built bottom-up within a sheetpile cofferdam. The station was built by a Japanese joint venture between Aoki Corporation and Tobishima Construction. The tunnel between Tai Wo Hau and Kwai Hing stations was completed in July 1980 using the drill-and-blast method. Tai Wo Hau station opened on 10 May 1982, in sync with Tsuen Wan line. In 1984, the New Territories Development Department awarded a contract for the construction of a park above the station to replace the one which originally existed there. This park is now called Kwok Shui Road Park.

== Station layout ==
Platforms 1 and 2 share the same island platform.

G	Ground level	Exits
L1	Concourse	Customer Service, MTRShops
L1	Concourse	Vending machine, ATMs
L2; Platforms	Platform 2	Tsuen Wan line towards Central (Kwai Hing) →
L2; Platforms	Island platform, doors will open on the right
L2; Platforms	Platform 1	← Tsuen Wan line towards Tsuen Wan (Terminus)

== Entrances/exits ==
- A: Hoi Pa San Tsuen, Ham Tin Tsuen, Ho Pui Tsuen, Kwok Shui Road, Primrose Hill
- B: Castle Peak Road, Kwai Yin Court, Kwai Chung Estate, Tai Wo Hau Estate
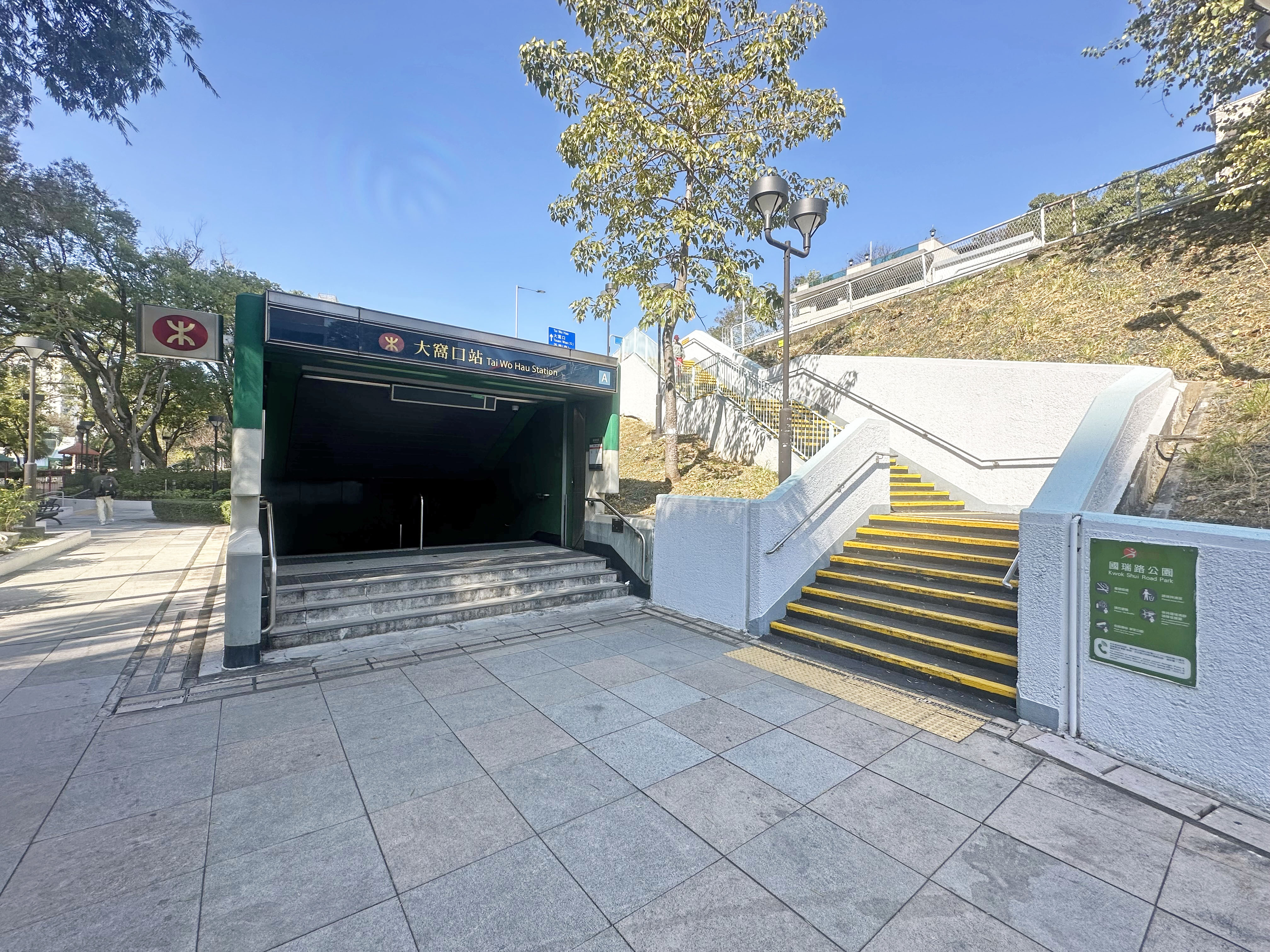
Exit A

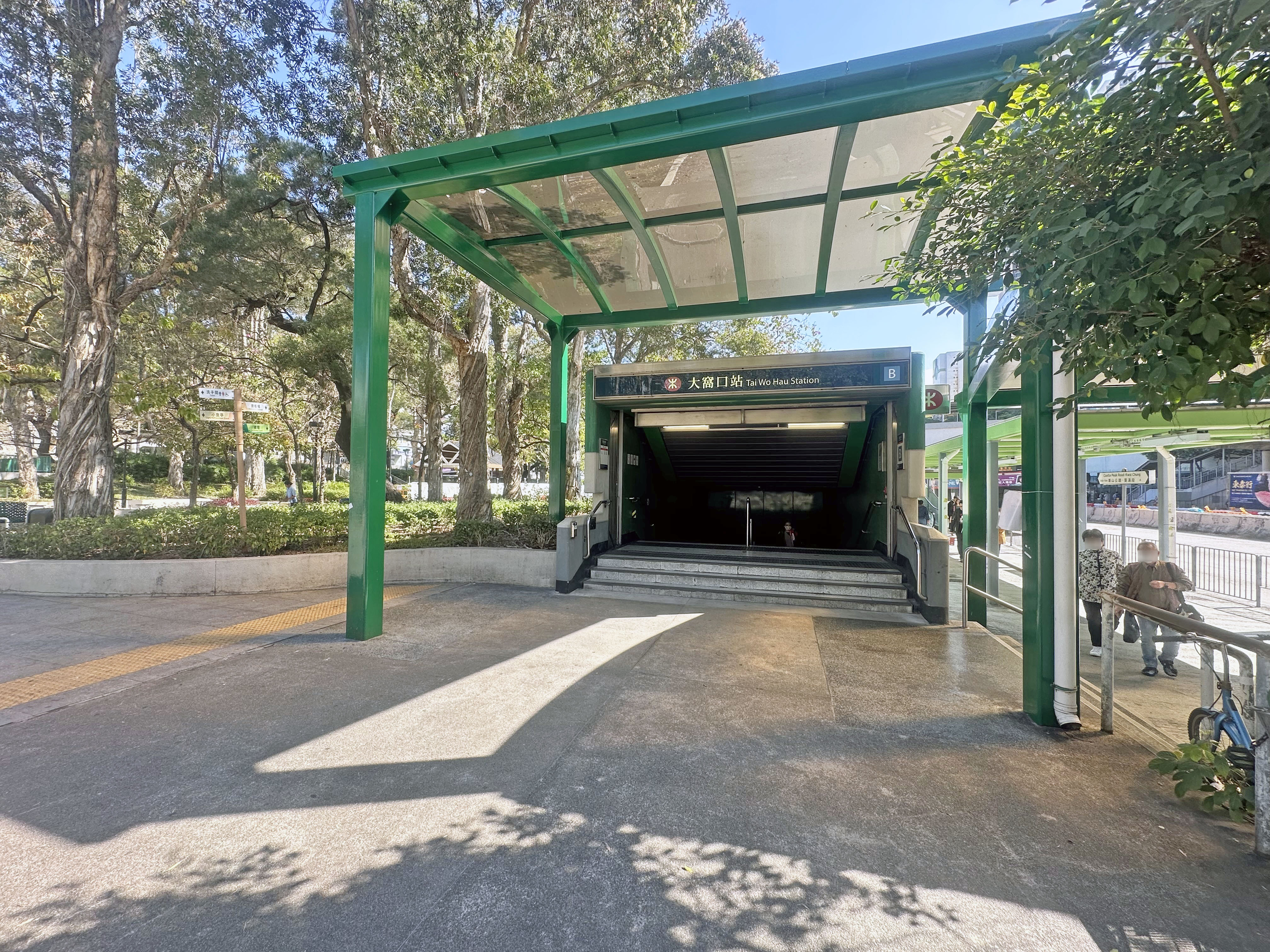
Exit B
