= Yau Kom Tau =

Yau Kom Tau or Yau Kam Tau (Chinese: 油柑頭) may refer to:

- Yau Kom Tau (Tsing Yi) on Tsing Yi island, Hong Kong
- Yau Kom Tau (Tsuen Wan District) in the Tsuen Wan District of Hong Kong
- Yau Kom Tau Village, sometimes transliterated as Yau Kam Tau Village, within the Yau Kom Tau (Tsuen Wan District) area
