= Upper Tai Wo Hau (constituency) =

Hong Kong constituency

- Elected constituency for the Kwai Tsing District Council
- Boundary of Upper Tai Wo Hau in Kwai Tsing District
- District: Kwai Tsing
- Legislative Council constituency: New Territories South West
- Population: 13,463 (2019)
- Electorate: 7,698 (2019)

Current constituency
- Created: 1994
- Number of members: One
- Member: vacant

Upper Tai Wo Hau is one of the 31 constituencies of the Kwai Tsing District Council. The seat elects one member of the council every four years. It was first created in the 1994 elections. Its boundary is loosely based on the upper part of Tai Wo Hau Estate in Tai Wo Hau.

== Councillors represented ==
Election	Member	Party
1994	Wong Bing-kuen	Democratic
1999	Hui Kei-cheung→vacant	Democratic

== Election results ==
=== 2010s ===
Kwai Tsing District Council Election, 2019: Upper Tai Wo Hau
Party	Candidate	Votes	%	±%
Democratic	Hui Kei-cheung	3,118	57.21	−1.04
FTU	Chan On-ni	2,332	42.79	+1.04
Majority		786	4.42	
Turnout		5,469	71.07	
Democratic hold		Swing		

Kwai Tsing District Council Election, 2015: Upper Tai Wo Hau
Party	Candidate	Votes	%	±%
Democratic	Hui Kei-cheung	2,217	58.25	−20.41
FTU	Lau Chin-pang	1,589	41.75	+20.41
Majority		628	16.50	
Turnout		3,806	53.20	
Democratic hold		Swing		

Kwai Tsing District Council Election, 2011: Upper Tai Wo Hau
Party	Candidate	Votes	%	±%
Democratic	Hui Kei-cheung	2,329	78.66	−6.34
FTU	Loong Fei-wan	632	21.34	
Majority		1,697	57.32	
Turnout		2,961	40.82	
Democratic hold		Swing		

=== 2000s ===
Kwai Tsing District Council Election, 2007: Upper Tai Wo Hau
Party	Candidate	Votes	%	±%
Democratic	Hui Kei-cheung	2,221	85.00	+25.91
Independent	Kong Wan-ching	392	15.00	
Majority		1,829	70.00	
Democratic hold		Swing		

Kwai Tsing District Council Election, 2003: Upper Tai Wo Hau
Party	Candidate	Votes	%	±%
Democratic	Hui Kei-cheung	2,134	59.09	+8.06
DAB	Ho Leung	1,044	32.85	−8.06
Majority		1,090	26.24	
Democratic hold		Swing		

=== 1990s ===
Kwai Tsing District Council Election, 1999: Upper Tai Wo Hau
Party	Candidate	Votes	%	±%
Democratic	Hui Kei-cheung	1,694	59.09	−11.78
DAB	Ho Leung	1,173	40.91	
Majority		521	18.18	
Democratic hold		Swing		

Kwai Tsing District Board Election, 1994: Upper Tai Wo Hau
Party	Candidate	Votes	%	±%
Democratic	Wong Bing-kuen	1,355	70.87	
Independent	Yuen Lai Lai-bing	557	29.13	
Majority		798	41.74	
Democratic win (new seat)				
