= The Westminster Terrace =

Housing estate in Hong Kong

Coordinates: 22°22′08″N 114°05′38″E

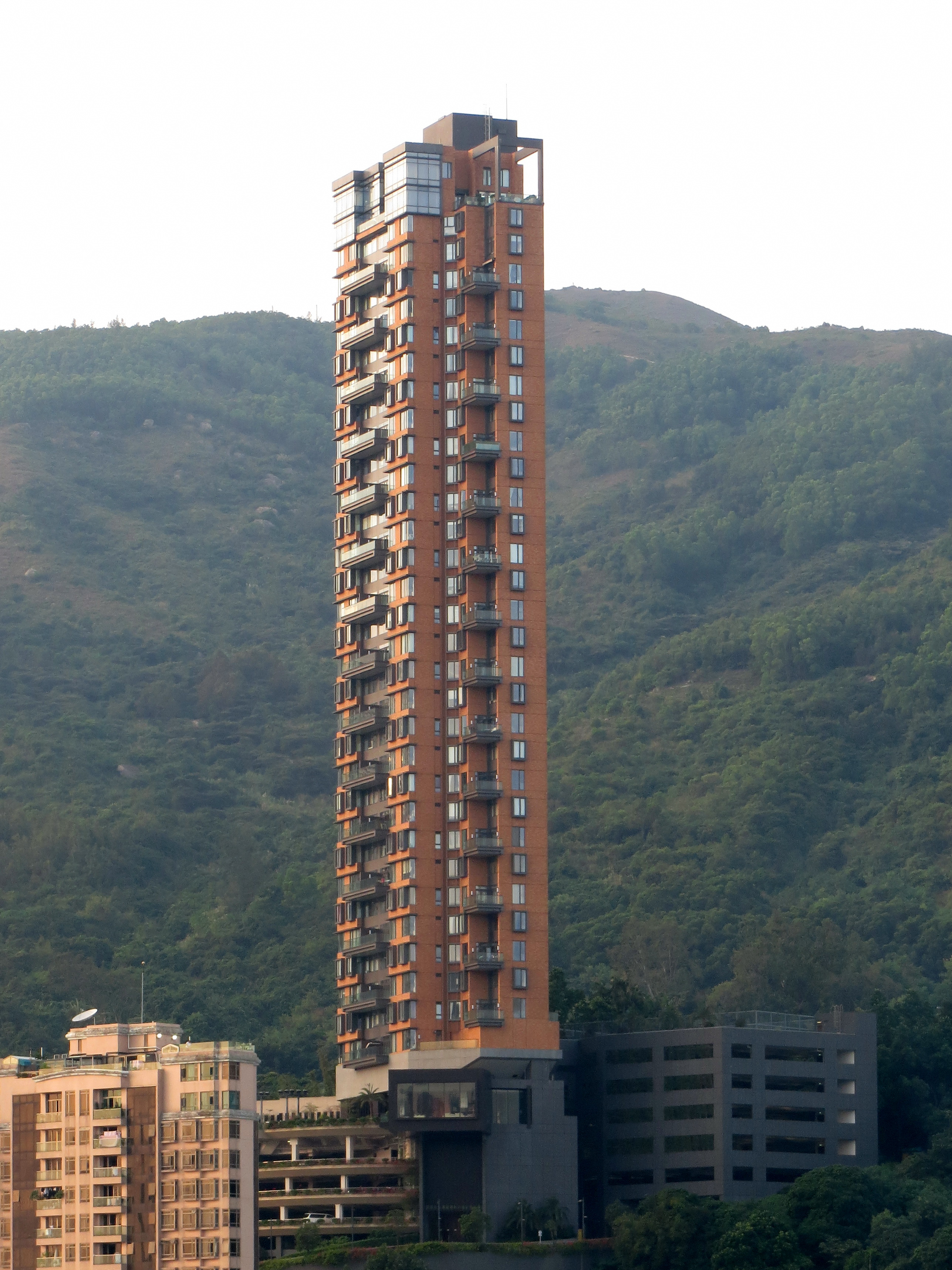
The Westminster Terrace

The Westminster Terrace (Chinese: 皇璧; Jyutping: wong4 bik3; pinyin: Huángbì) is a private housing estate located in Yau Kom Tau, Tsuen Wan District, New Territories, Hong Kong.

Developed by Grosvenor Group in conjunction with Asia Standard Group, the single residential building consists of 59 four ensuite-bedroom duplex flats ranging from 3,200 to 6,500 sq ft.

== See also ==
- Golden Villa
- Bellagio (Hong Kong)
