= Luk Keng Pier =

Pier in Yam O, Hong Kong

Coordinates: 22.33185°N 114.02431°E

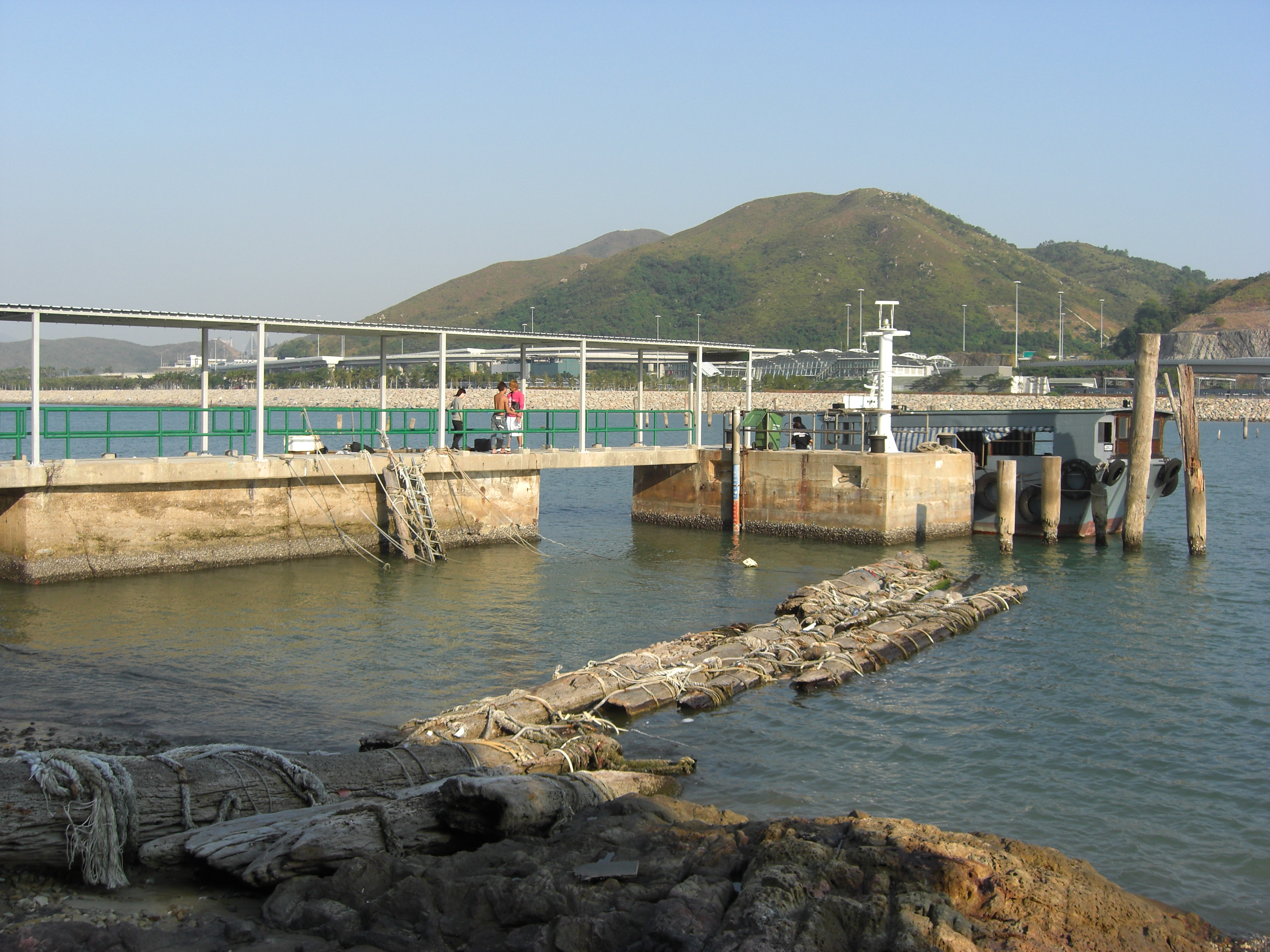
Luk Keng Pier

Luk Keng Pier (Chinese: 鹿頸碼頭) is a small public pier adjoining Luk Keng Village, Yam O, Lantau Island, Hong Kong. There is only a kai-to ferry route to and from Tsing Lung Tau in Tsuen Wan for villagers to travel to the urban area. This closed transportation relationship between Yam O and Tsing Lung Tau explains why Northeast Lantau is part of the Tsuen Wan District, instead of the Islands District. It was the only public transportation for Luk Keng Village and the whole of Yam O before Sunny Bay station on the MTR opened.

== See others ==
- Luk Keng Village
- Yam O
