= Yau Ma Hom =

Village in Hong Kong

Coordinates: 22.371561°N 114.133508°E

Yau Ma Hom or Yau Ma Hom Resite Village (Chinese: 油麻磡村) is a village in the Tsuen Wan District of Hong Kong.

== Administration ==
Yau Ma Hom is a recognized village under the New Territories Small House Policy.
