= Ho Pui Tsuen (Tsuen Wan District) =

Village in Hong Kong

Coordinates: 22.371578°N 114.126311°E

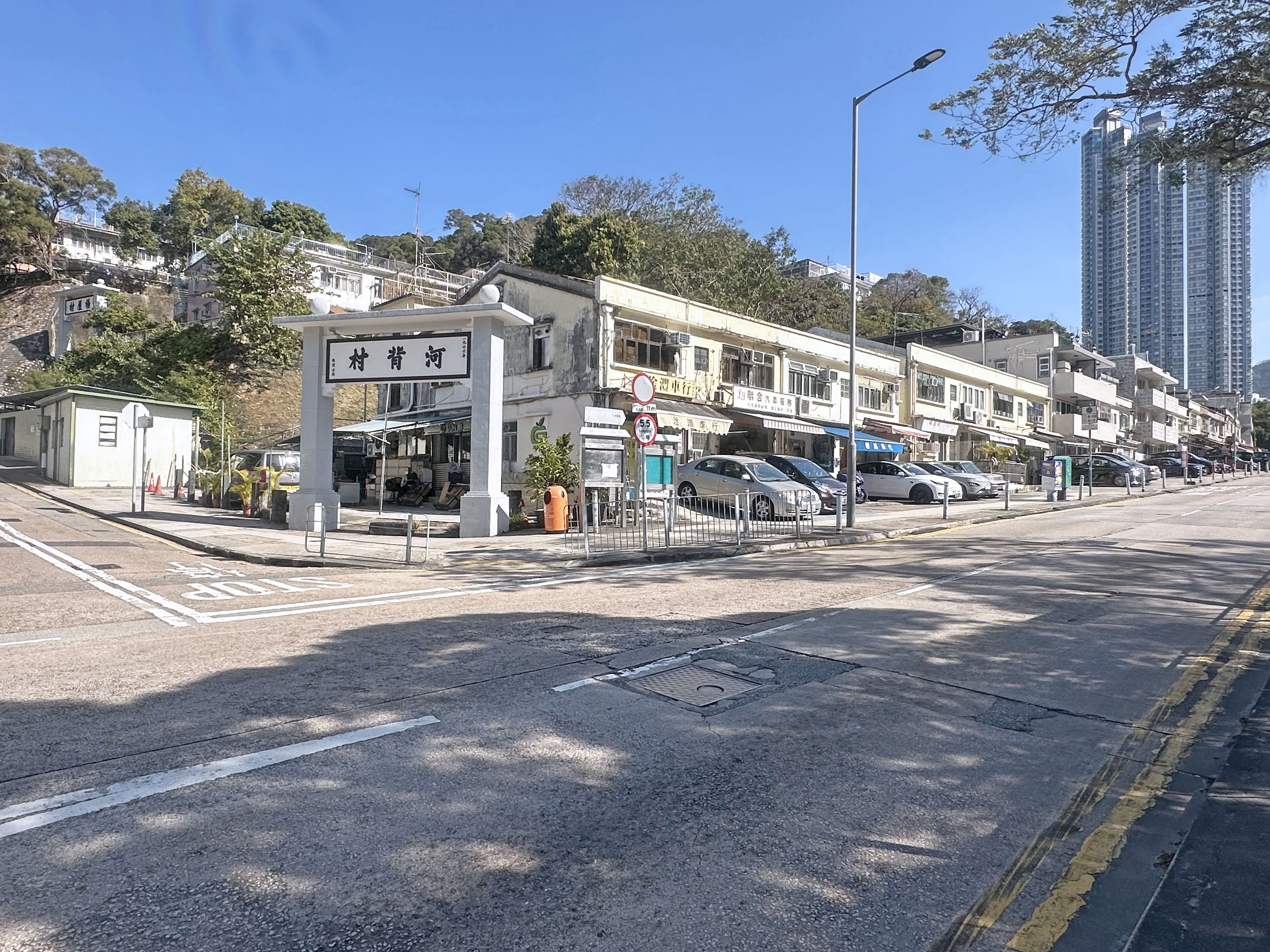
Kwok Shui Road (國瑞路) at Ho Pui Tsuen in 2025.

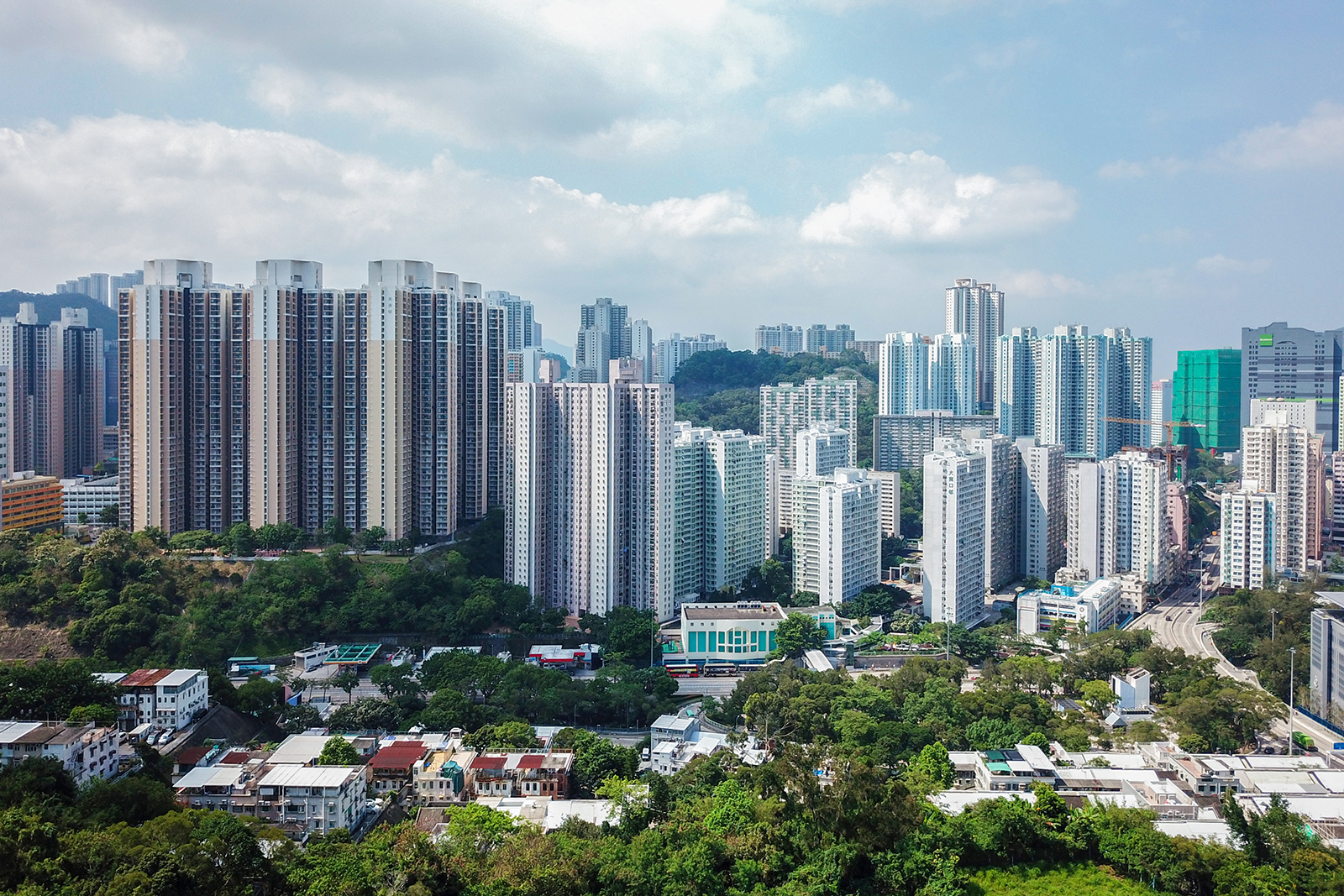
View of Tai Wo Hau, with Ho Pui Tsuen, Kwan Mun Hau Tsuen and Yeung Uk Tsuen in the foreground in June 2018.

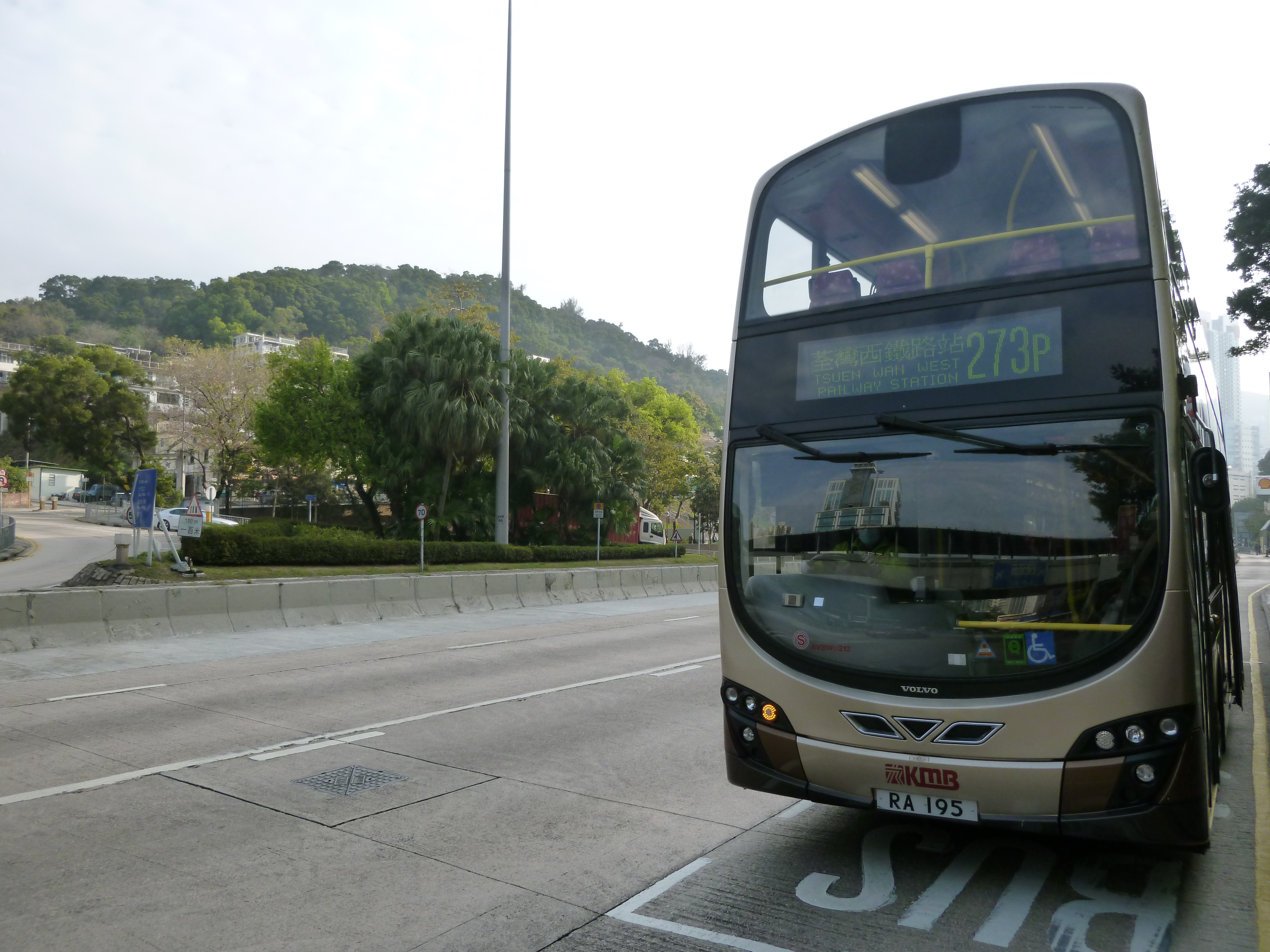
Castle Peak Road at Ho Pui Tsuen.

Ho Pui Tsuen (Chinese: 河背村) or Ho Pui New Village is a village in Tai Wo Hau, Tsuen Wan District, Hong Kong.

== Administration ==
Ho Pui New Village is a recognized village under the New Territories Small House Policy.

== History ==
Ho Pui Tsuen, like the nearby villages of Kwan Mun Hau Tsuen (關門口村) and Yeung Uk Tsuen (楊屋村), is a resite village.

As the consequence of the development of Tsuen Wan into a new town in 1965-1966, Kwan Mun Hau village, Ho Bui Village and Yeung Uk Village were relocated to the Tai Wo Hau area. Because of land shortage, some villagers had to move to the land near the then new Yau Kam Tau Village, and formed a new village called Tsuen Wan Sam Tsuen.
