= Lower Tai Wo Hau (constituency) =

Hong Kong constituency

- Elected constituency for the Kwai Tsing District Council
- Boundary of Lower Tai Wo Hau in Kwai Tsing District
- District: Kwai Tsing
- Legislative Council constituency: New Territories South West
- Population: 13,158 (2019)
- Electorate: 9,156 (2019)

Current constituency
- Created: 1994
- Number of members: One
- Member: vacant

Lower Tai Wo Hau is one of the 31 constituencies of the Kwai Tsing District Council. The seat elects one member of the council every four years. It was first created in the 1994 elections. Its boundary is loosely based on the lower part of Tai Wo Hau Estate in Tai Wo Hau.

== Councillors represented ==
Election	Member	Party
1994	Wong Hoi-man	ADPL
1999	Wong Bing-kuen→vacant	Democratic

== Election results ==
=== 2010s ===
Kwai Tsing District Council Election, 2019: Lower Tai Wo Hau
Party	Candidate	Votes	%	±%
Democratic	Wong Bing-kuen	4,463	69.73	+0.38
FTU	Huang Si-hong	1,937	30.27	−0.38
Majority		2,526	39.46	
Turnout		6,426	70.18	
Democratic hold		Swing		

Kwai Tsing District Council Election, 2015: Lower Tai Wo Hau
Party	Candidate	Votes	%	±%
Democratic	Wong Bing-kuen	3,098	69.35	−5.43
FTU	Cheung Wai-man	1,369	30.65	+5.43
Majority		1,729	38.70	
Turnout		4,467	53.69	
Democratic hold		Swing		

Kwai Tsing District Council Election, 2011: Lower Tai Wo Hau
Party	Candidate	Votes	%	±%
Democratic	Wong Bing-kuen	3,010	74.78	−9.81
FTU	Tsui Siu-fai	1,015	25.22	
Majority		1,995	49.56	
Turnout		4,025	46.38	
Democratic hold		Swing		

=== 2000s ===
Kwai Tsing District Council Election, 2007: Lower Tai Wo Hau
Party	Candidate	Votes	%	±%
Democratic	Wong Bing-kuen	2,464	84.59	+5.63
Independent	Kong Chi-wah	449	15.41	
Majority		2,015	69.18	
Democratic hold		Swing		

Kwai Tsing District Council Election, 2003: Lower Tai Wo Hau
Party	Candidate	Votes	%	±%
Democratic	Wong Bing-kuen	3,043	78.96	+25.40
DAB	Suen Moon-kan	594	15.41	−31.03
Independent	Mak Wai-yin	217	5.63	
Majority		2,449	63.55	
Democratic hold		Swing		

=== 1990s ===
Kwai Tsing District Council Election, 1999: Lower Tai Wo Hau
Party	Candidate	Votes	%	±%
Democratic	Wong Bing-kuen	1,917	53.56	+9.68
DAB	Wong Kam-fai	1,662	46.44	
Majority		255	7.12	
Democratic gain from ADPL		Swing	{{{swing}}}	

Kwai Tsing District Board Election, 1994: Lower Tai Wo Hau
Party	Candidate	Votes	%	±%
ADPL	Wong Hoi-man	1,247	56.12	
Democratic	Chung Man-fai	975	43.88	
Majority		272	12.24	
ADPL win (new seat)				
