= Hoi Pa =

Vietnamese area and village

Coordinates: 22.37208°N 114.127874°E

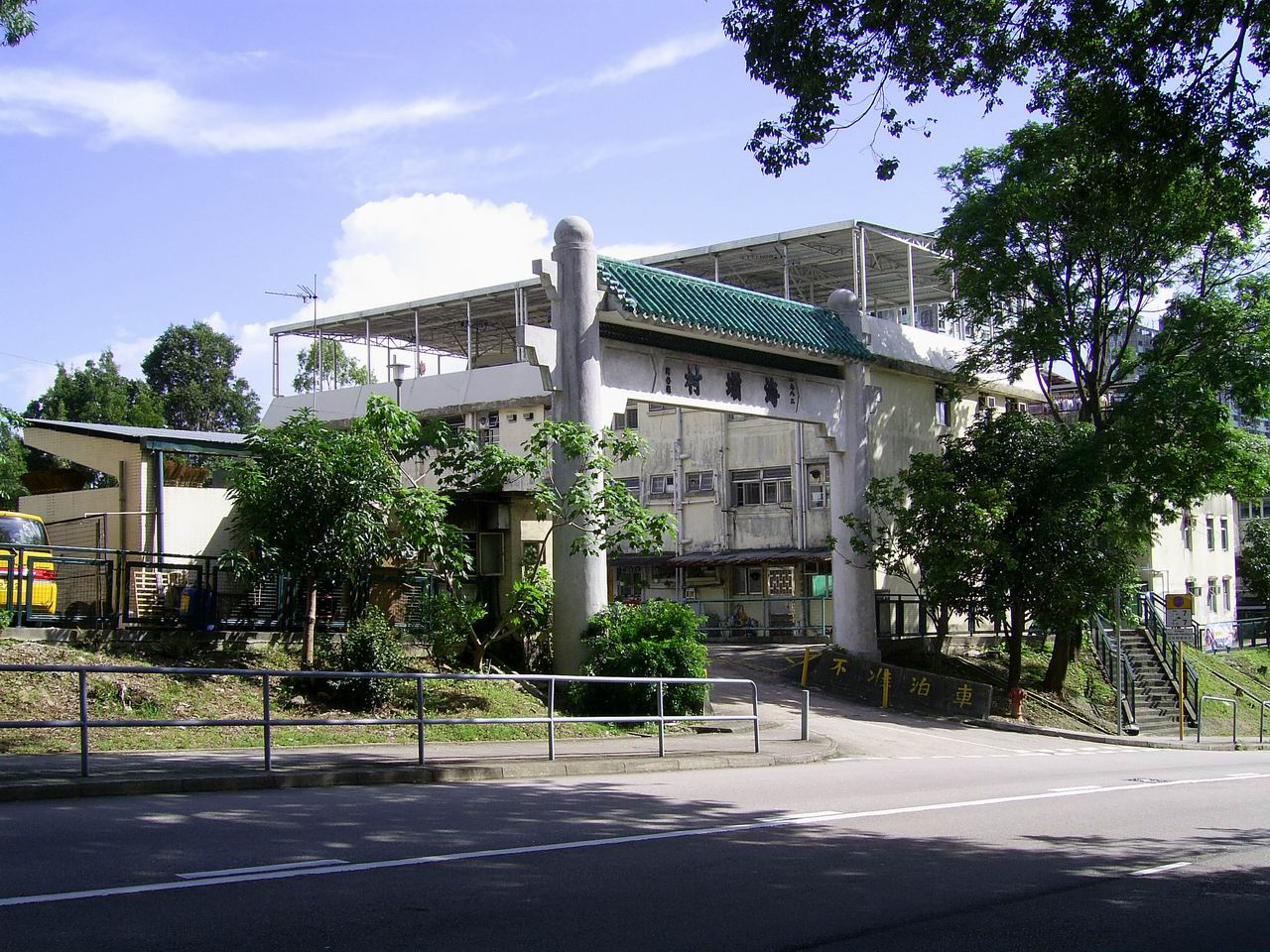
Paifang of Hoi Pa Resite Village.

Hoi Pa (Chinese: 海壩) is an area and village in Tsuen Wan District, Hong Kong.

== Administration ==
Hoi Pa and Hoi Pa New Village (海壩村) are recognized villages under the New Territories Small House Policy.

== History ==
In late 19th Century, it was one of four yeuk (約; 'district or administration unit') in Tsuen Wan, together with Kwai Chung, Shek Wai Kok and Tsing Yi. The heads of four yeuks formed the Tsuen Wan Security Council (荃灣安全局) to secure the area of Tsuen Wan.

The original site of the village is in present-day Jockey Club Tak Wah Park. Due to the development of Tsuen Wan New Town, it was relocated to the current location opposite to Tai Wo Hau. Several historical houses at the original location were declared as monuments and are now preserved inside the park.

== See also ==
- Tai Wo Hau station
