= Cheung Sok =

Small island in Hong Kong

Coordinates: 22.33522°N 114.02343°E

- Traditional Chinese: 長索
- Simplified Chinese: 长索
Transcriptions
Standard Mandarin
- Hanyu Pinyin: Cháng Suǒ
Hakka
- Romanization: Cong2 Sok5
Yue: Cantonese
- Jyutping: coeng4 sok3

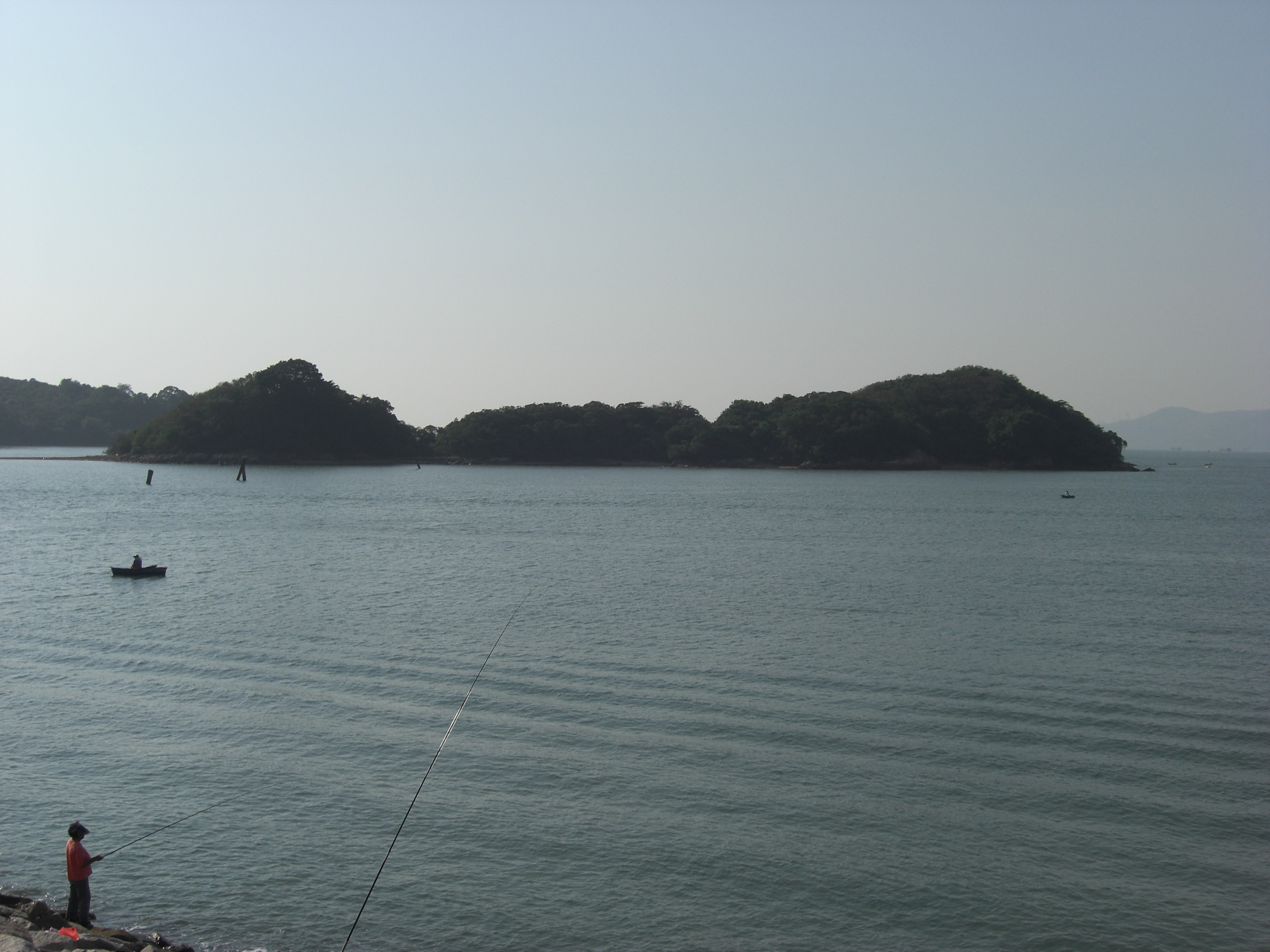
Full view of Cheung Sok

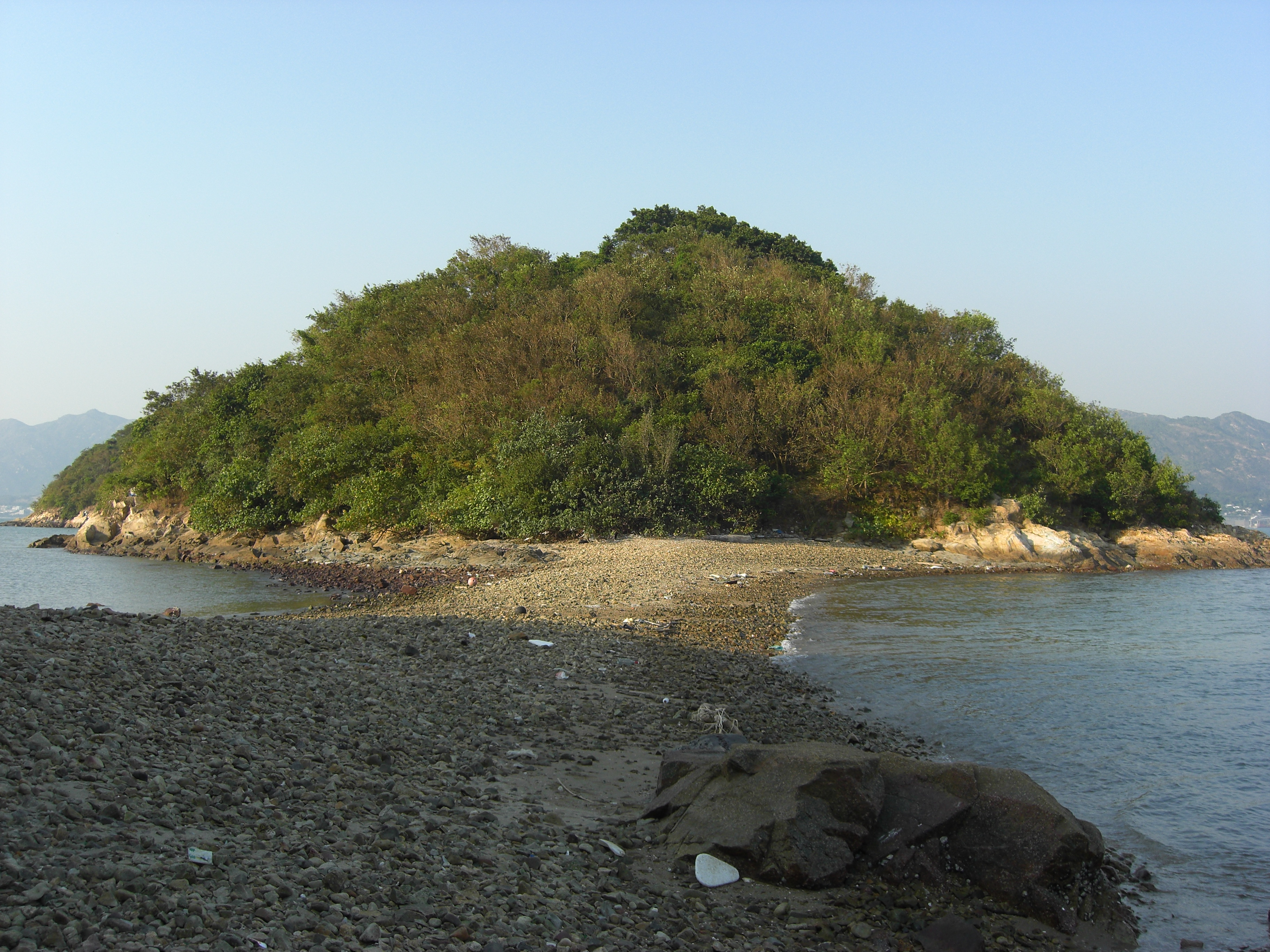
Tombolo linking Lantau Island and Cheung Sok

Cheung Sok (Chinese: 長索) is a small island to the north of Yam O Bay, Lantau Island, Hong Kong. It is part of the Tsuen Wan District. The island is connected to Yam O bay on Lantau via a thin tombolo, and at low tide can be reached on foot. The path crossing the tombolo at low tide from the adjacent Luk Keng village known as “Angel’s Road”.

== See also ==
- List of islands and peninsulas of Hong Kong
