= Lai To (constituency) =

- Former Elected constituency for the Tsuen Wan District Council
- Boundary of Lai To in Tsuen Wan District
- District: Tsuen Wan
- Legislative Council constituency: New Territories South West
- Population: 17,951 (2019)
- Electorate: 11,218 (2019)

Former constituency
- Created: 1994
- Abolished: 2023
- Number of members: One

Lai To (Chinese: 麗濤) was one of the 19 constituencies in the Tsuen Wan District.

The constituency returned one district councillor to the Tsuen Wan District Council, with an election every four years until it was abolished in 2023.

Lai To constituency has estimated population of 20,502.

== Councillors represented ==
Election	Member	Party
1994	Chan Chun-shing	Independent
1999	Tin Sai-ming	Democratic
200?	Tin Sai-ming	Independent
2007	Wong Wai-kit	Independent
2019	Ronald Tse Man-chak→Vacant	Independent democrat

== Election results ==
=== 2010s ===
Tsuen Wan District Council Election, 2019: Lai To
Party	Candidate	Votes	%	±%
Ind. democrat	Ronald Tse Man-chak	5,098	58.45	
Nonpartisan	Wong Wai-kit	3,624	41.55	
Majority		1,474	16.90	
Turnout		8,743	77.94	
Ind. democrat gain from Nonpartisan		Swing		
