= Pai Min Kok =

Coordinates: 22.365667°N 114.053946°E

Pai Min Kok (Chinese: 排棉角村) is a village in Tsuen Wan District, Hong Kong.
