= Luk Keng Village =

Village on Lantau Island, Hong Kong

Coordinates: 22.33201°N 114.02347°E

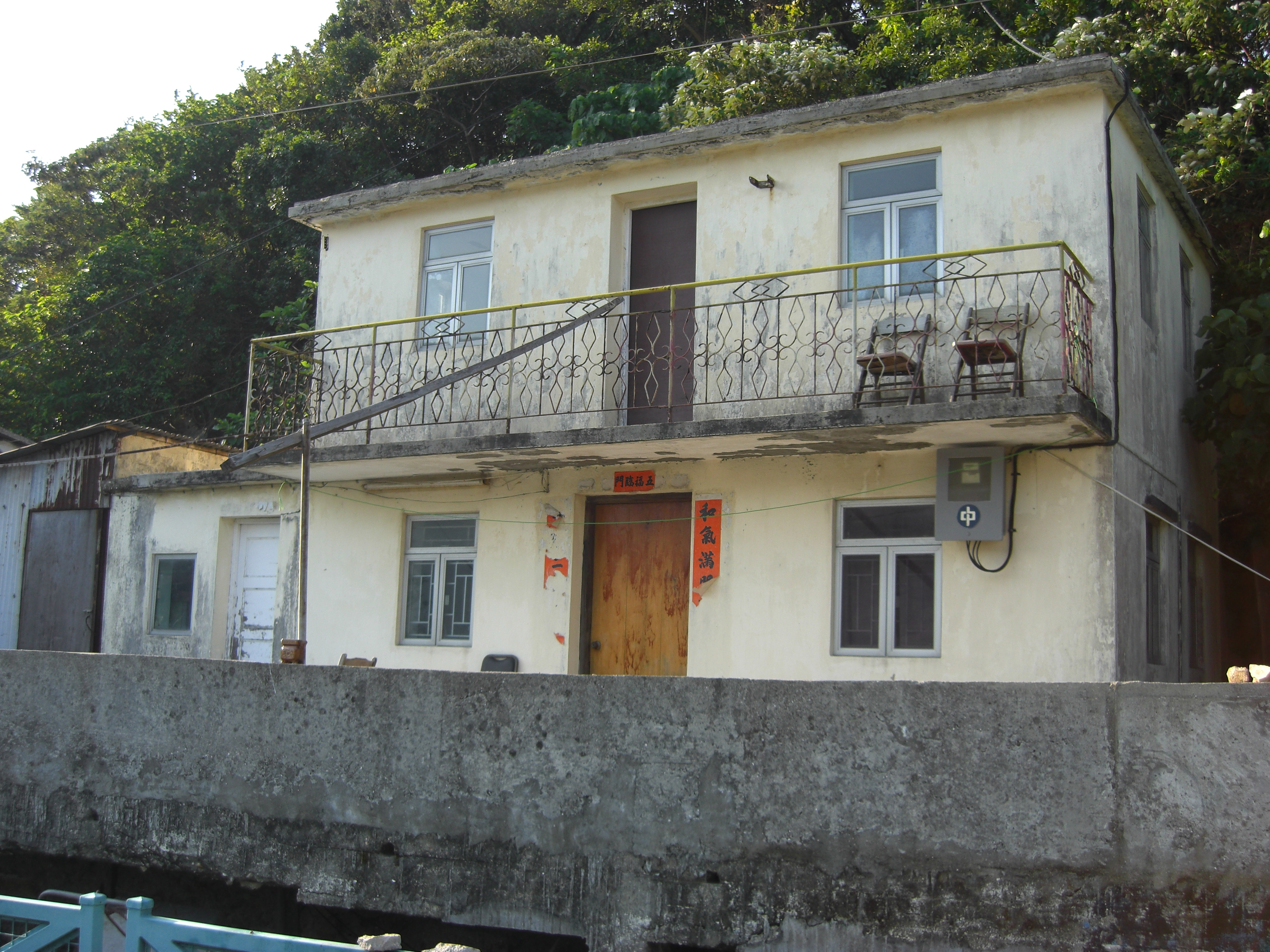
A house in Luk Keng Village.

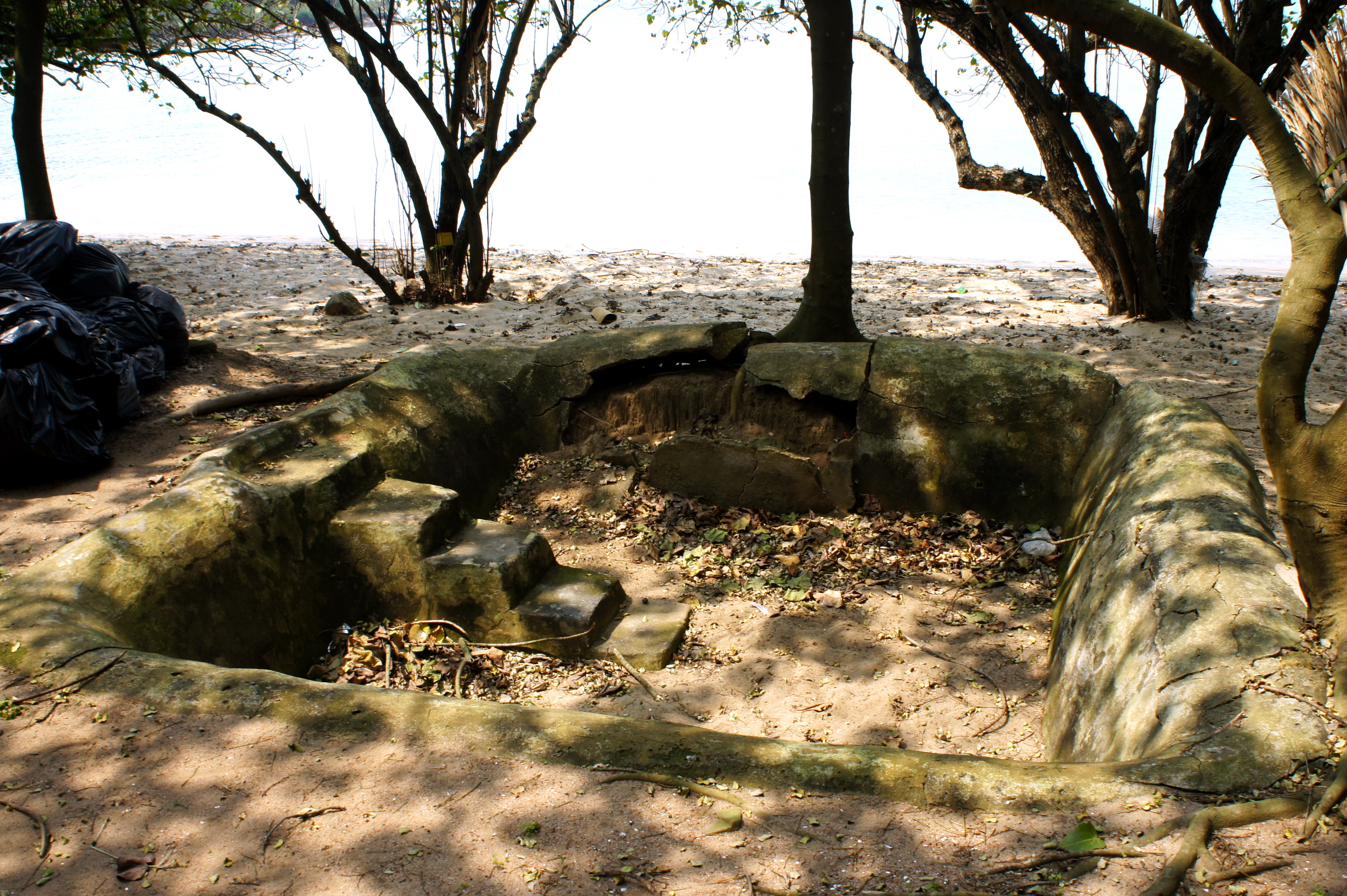
Kiln in Luk Keng Village.

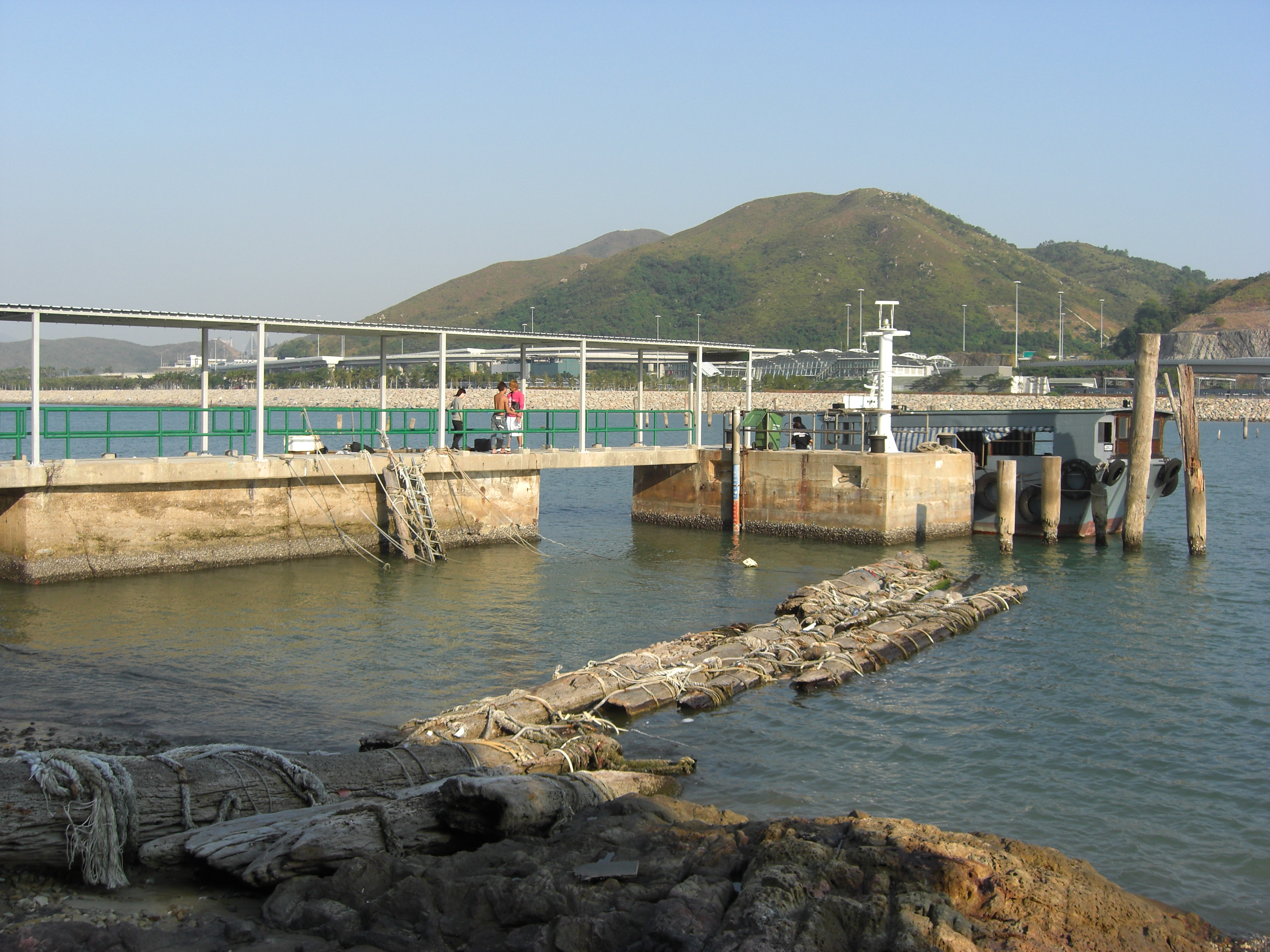
Luk Keng Pier.

Luk Keng Village or Luk Keng Tsuen (Chinese: 鹿頸村) is a village located on the Yam O peninsula on Lantau Island in the New Territories of Hong Kong, which links to Cheung Sok, a nearby uninhabited island, via the "Angel's Road," a tombolo path accessible only at low tide. Although nearby areas including Sunny Bay station have been developed, Luk Keng Village is still preserved as an undeveloped rural heritage area.

== Administration ==
Luk Keng is a recognized village under the New Territories Small House Policy.

== History ==
In December 2007, archaeologists found a number of Tang dynasty (618–907) kilns in Luk Keng Village, although some of these had been destroyed by the construction of a barbecue area by the Hong Kong SAR Government.

== Transportation ==
- MTR: Sunny Bay station (About 30-minutes' walk from Station Exit A to the village)
- From the Luk Keng Pier there a kai-to transportation service to Tsing Lung Tau in Tsuen Wan which is removed in 2009.
