= Pak Tin Pa =

Village of Hong Kong

Coordinates: 22.37713°N 114.120619°E

Pak Tin Pa (Chinese: 白田壩村) is a village in Tsuen Wan District, Hong Kong.

== Administration ==
Pak Tin Pa is a recognized village under the New Territories Small House Policy.
