= Tai Wo Hau Estate =

Public housing estate in Kwai Chung, Hong Kong

Coordinates: 22.3672°N 114.1229°E

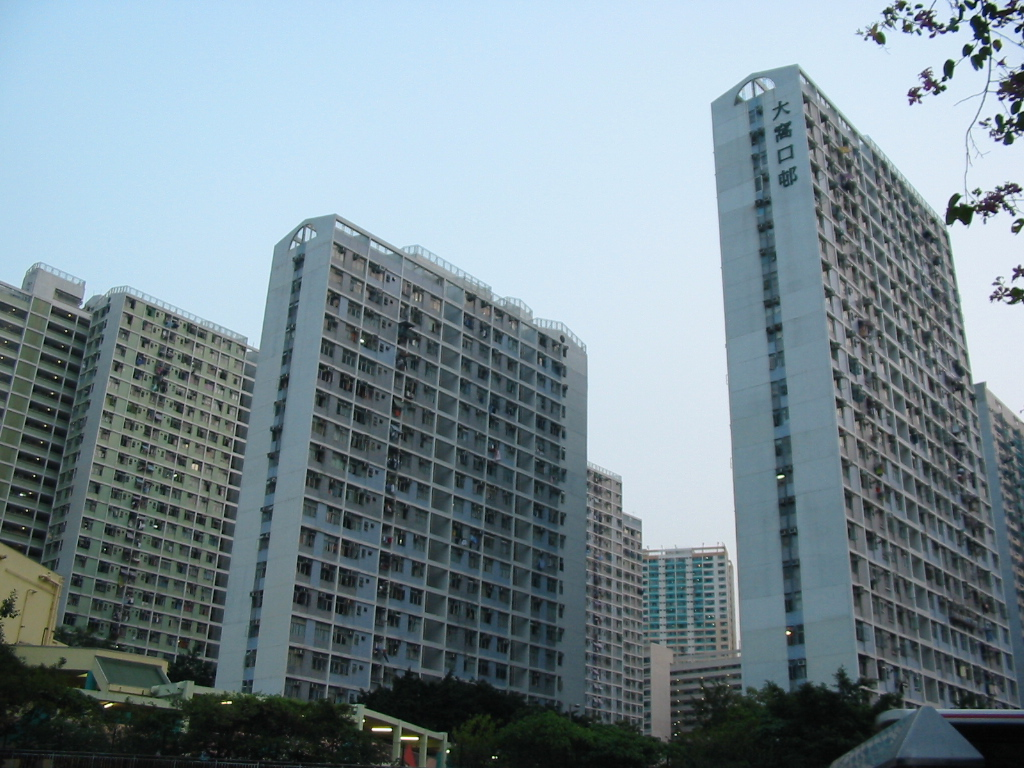
Tai Wo Hau Estate

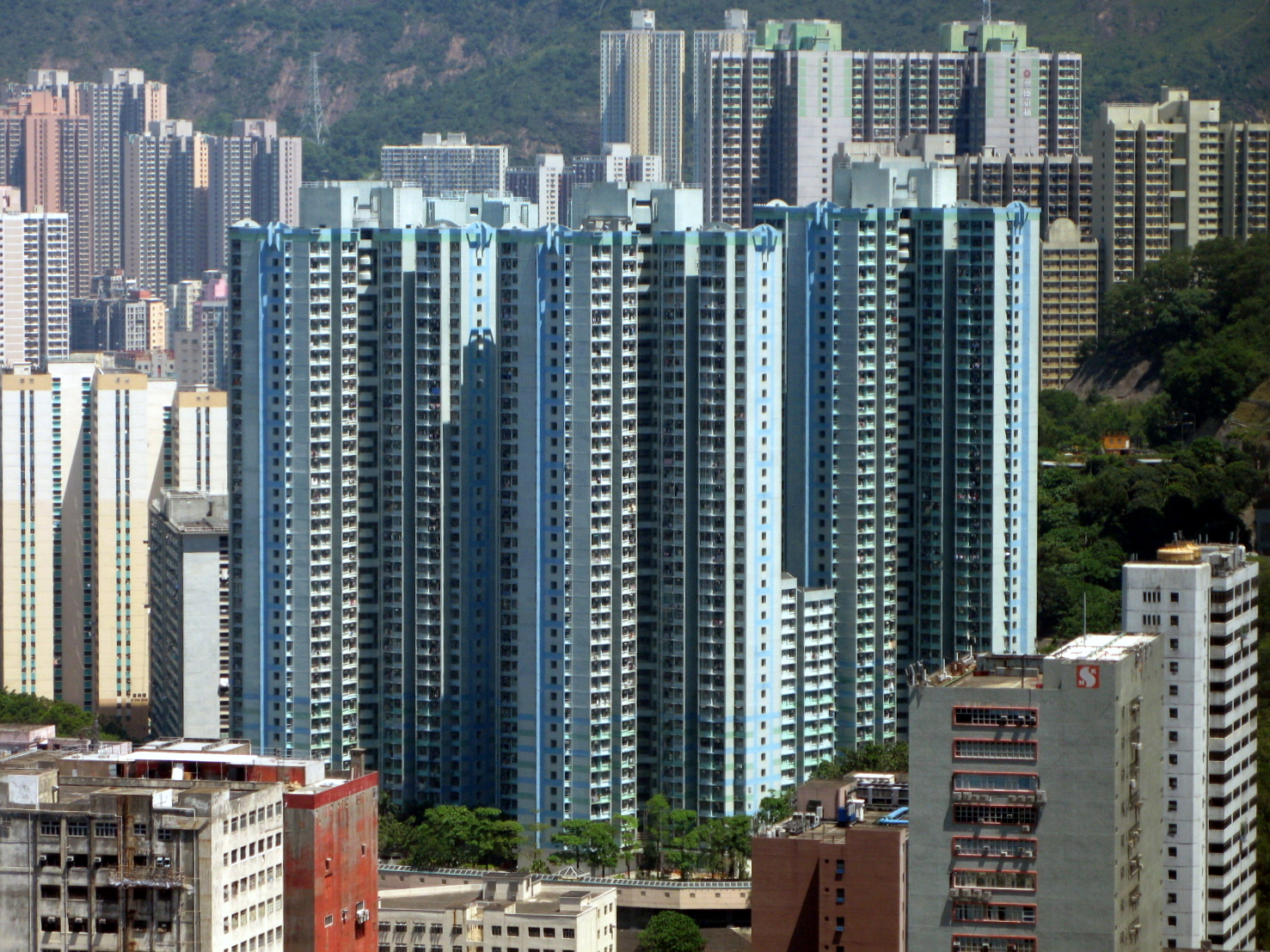
Harmony blocks in Tai Wo Hau Estate

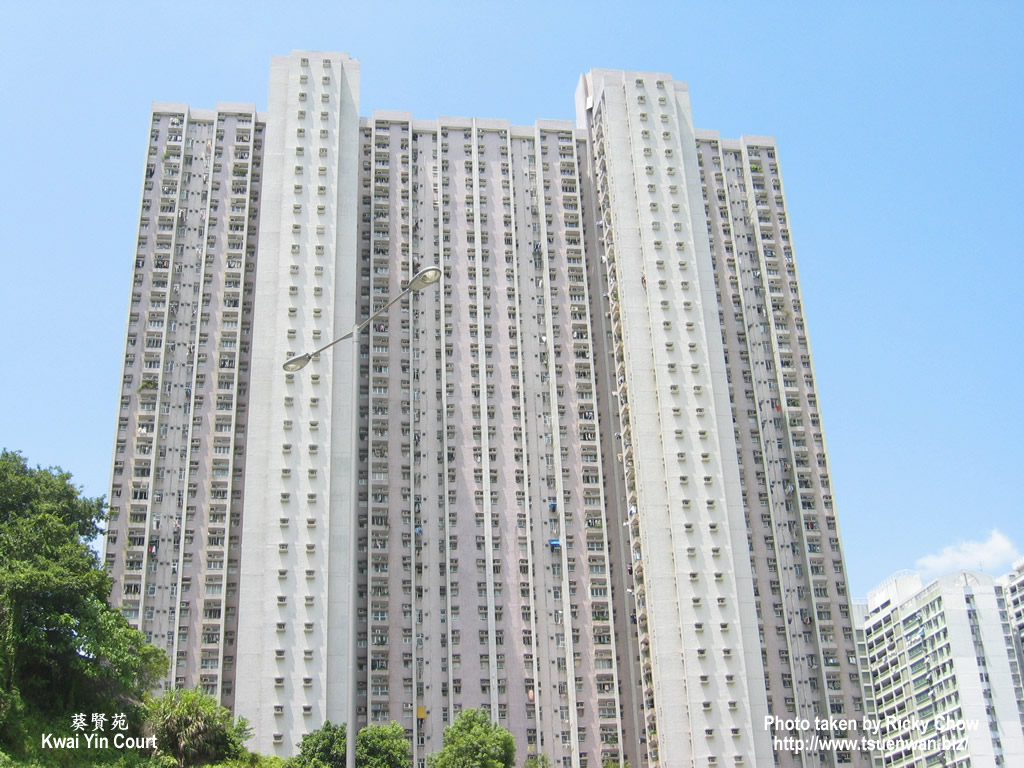
Kwai Yin Court

Tai Wo Hau Estate (Chinese: 大窩口邨) is a public housing estate in Tai Wo Hau, Kwai Chung, Kwai Tsing District, New Territories, Hong Kong. It has a total of 17 blocks following redevelopment.

Kwai Yin Court (葵賢苑) is a Home Ownership Scheme court in Tai Wo Hau Estate and opposite to MTR Tai Wo Hau station. It has two blocks built in 1993.

== History ==
After the World War II, a large number of squatter dwellings were built in Tai Wo Hau, on the hill between Tsuen Wan and Kwai Chung, and on the fields of the villages north of Castle Peak Road. The squatter area was cleared in the 1960s for the construction of the Tai Wo Hau Resettlement Estate (大窩口徙置區). The resettlement blocks were cleared between the 1970s and 80s. The current blocks were built between 1979 and 1993.

== Houses ==
=== Tai Wo Hau Estate ===
Name	Type	Completion
Fu Kwai House	Old Slab	1979
Fu Kwok House	Old Slab	1980
Fu Keung House	Old Slab	1984
Fu On House	Single H (Special Edition)	1980
Fu Wing House	Double H	1980
Fu Wah House	Double H	1980
Fu Pong House	Double H	1984
Fu Man House	Double H	1984
Fu Sau House	Linear L	1988
Fu Ping House	Linear L	1988
Fu Yat House	Linear 1	1988
Fu Nga House	Linear 1	1988
Fu Ching House	Linear 1	1989
Fu Pik House	Linear 1	1989
Fu Tai House	Harmony 1	1993
Fu Tak House	Harmony 1	1993
Fu Yin House	Harmony 1	1993

=== Kwai Yin Court ===
Name	Type	Completion
Kwai Yee House	NCB (Ver.1984)	1993
Kwai Him House	NCB (Ver.1984)	1993

== Demographics ==
According to the 2016 by-census, Tai Wo Hau Estate had a population of 20,848. The median age was 47.7 and the majority of residents (96.2 per cent) were of Chinese ethnicity. The average household size was 2.7 people. The median monthly household income of all households (i.e. including both economically active and inactive households) was HK$21,280.

== Politics ==
For the 2019 District Council election, the estate fell within two constituencies. Most of the estate and Kwai Yin Court are located in the Lower Tai Wo Hau constituency, which was formerly represented by Wong Bing-kuen until July 2021, while the remainder of the estate falls within the Upper Tai Wo Hau constituency, which was formerly represented by Hui Kei-cheung until July 2021.

== See also ==
- Public housing estates in Kwai Chung
