= Ma Sim Pai =

Coordinates: 22.37761°N 114.120774°E

Ma Sim Pai (Chinese: 馬閃排) is a village in Tsuen Wan District, Hong Kong.
