= Kwu Hang =

Coordinates: 22.374829°N 114.136142°E

Kwu Hang (Chinese: 古坑村) is a village in Tsuen Wan District, Hong Kong.
