= Sai Lau Kok =

Coordinates: 22.377399°N 114.122724°E

Sai Lau Kok (Chinese: 西樓角村) is a village in Tsuen Wan District, Hong Kong.

== Administration ==
Sai Lau Kok is a recognized village under the New Territories Small House Policy.
