= Yi Pei Chun =

Coordinates: 22.375293°N 114.136154°E

Yi Pei Chun (Chinese: 二陂圳) is a village in Tsuen Wan District, Hong Kong.

== Administration ==
Yi Pei Chun is a recognized village under the New Territories Small House Policy.
