= San Tsuen (Tsuen Wan District) =

Coordinates: 22.378495°N 114.122354°E

San Tsuen (Chinese: 新村) is a village in Tsuen Wan District, Hong Kong.

== Administration ==
San Tsuen is a recognized village under the New Territories Small House Policy.
