= Ham Tin Tsuen, Tai Wo Hau =

Coordinates: 22.372006°N 114.129137°E

Ham Tin Tsuen (Chinese: 咸田村) or Ham Tin New Village (咸田村) is a village in Tai Wo Hau, Tsuen Wan District, Hong Kong.

== Administration ==
Yuen Tuen New Village is a recognized village under the New Territories Small House Policy.

== See also ==
- Tai Wo Hau station
