= Yau Kom Tau Village =

Village of Hong Kong

Coordinates: 22.371883°N 114.096927°E

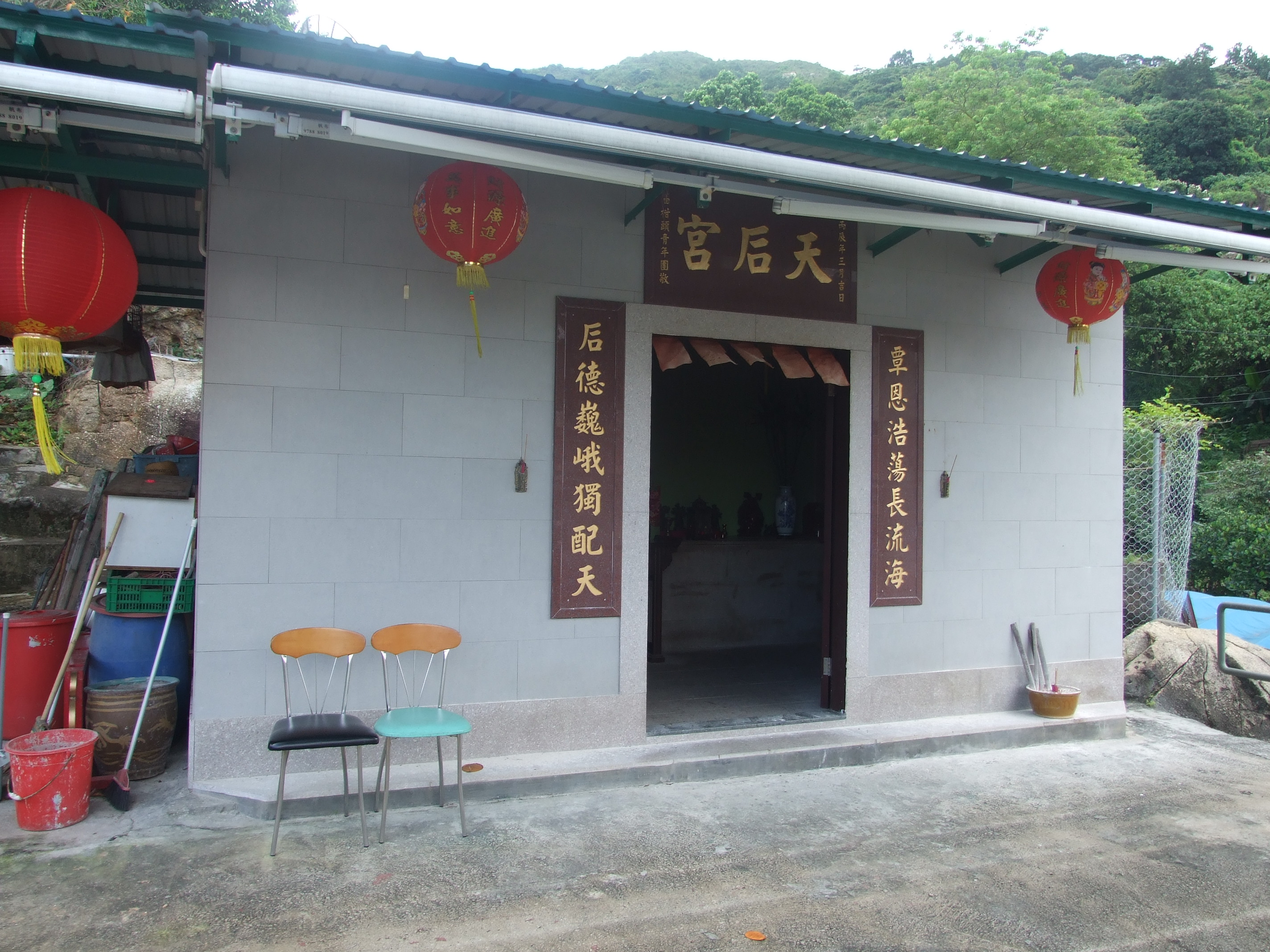
Tin Hau Temple in Yau Kom Tau Village.

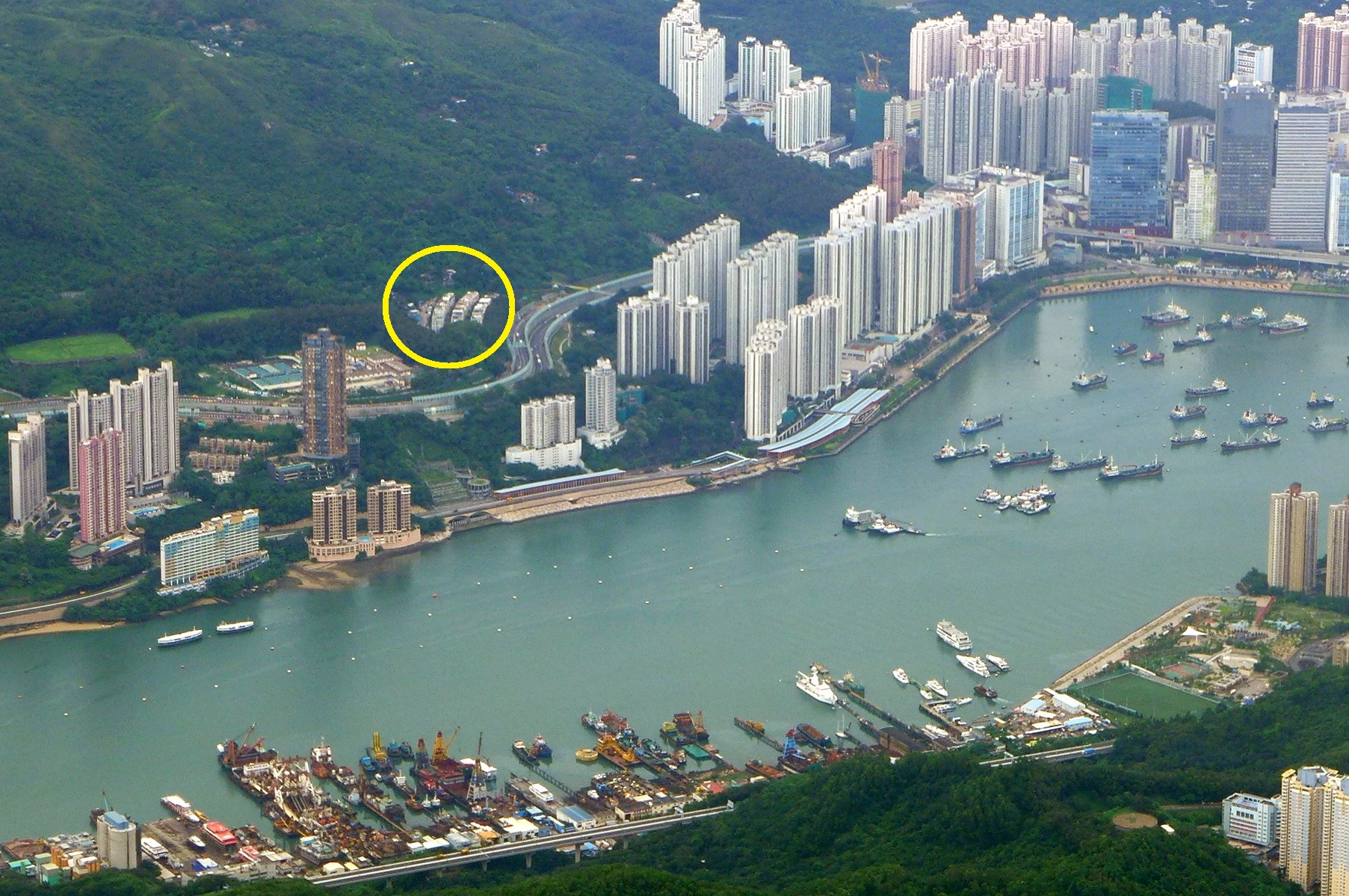
Aerial photograph showing the location of Yau Kom Tau Village and Tsuen Wan Sam Tsuen.

Yau Kom Tau Village (Chinese: 油柑頭村), sometimes transliterated as Yau Kam Tau Village, is a village located in the Yau Kom Tau area, west of Tsuen Wan, in Tsuen Wan District, Hong Kong.

== Administration ==
Yau Kom Tau is a recognized village under the New Territories Small House Policy. It is one of the villages represented within the Tsuen Wan Rural Committee. For electoral purposes, Yau Kom Tau Village is part of the Lai To constituency, which was formerly represented by Ronald Tse Man-chak until July 2021.

== History ==
Yau Kom Tau Village was established in 1864 and settled by the Yeung family from Yuen Long. It was originally located at the place of the current Nan Fung Centre, next to Tsuen Wan station. The village was resited to the present location in 1984, following the development of the MTR.

== Features ==
An ancestral hall, rebuilt in 1984, is located at the entrance of the village.

A Tin Hau Temple is located in Yau Kom Tau Village. It is a single storey stone house. It lies by the side of the Yau Kam Tau Village Rural Committee, on a terrace built by boulders.

== See also ==
- Tsuen Wan Sam Tsuen, an adjacent resettlement village
