= Tai Wo Hau =

- Traditional Chinese: 大窩口
- Simplified Chinese: 大窝口
Transcriptions
Standard Mandarin
- Hanyu Pinyin: Dàwōkǒu
Hakka
- Romanization: Tai4 Vo1 Hiu3
Yue: Cantonese
- Yale Romanization: Daaih wō háu
- Jyutping: Dai6 Wo1 hau2

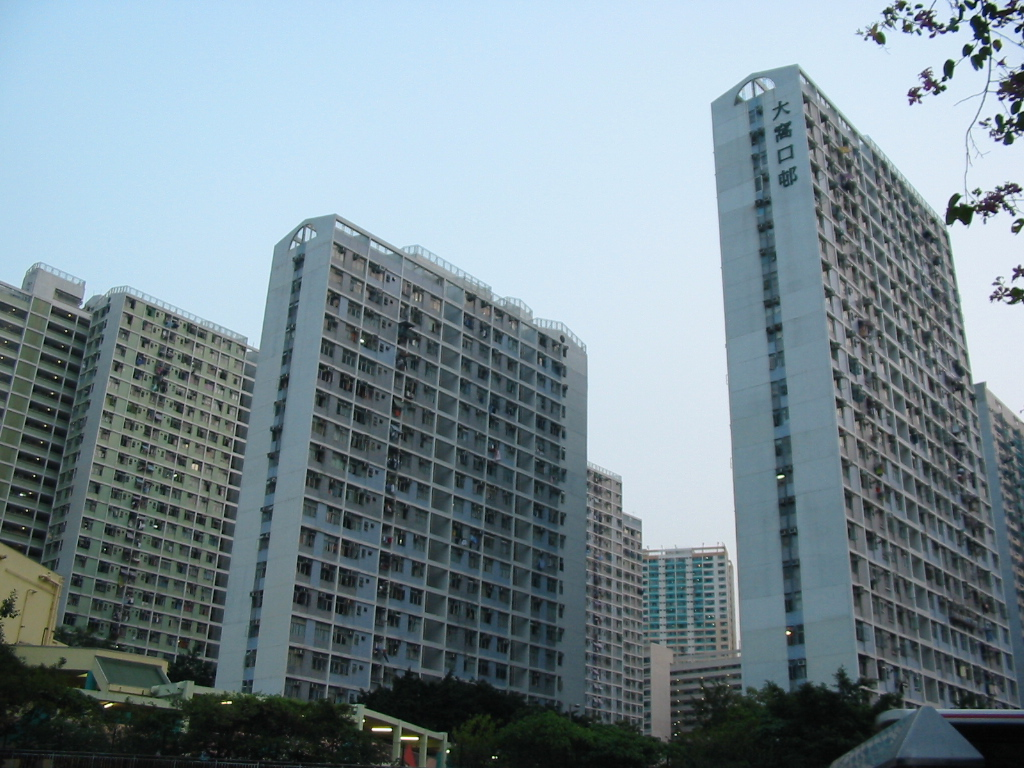
Tai Wo Hau Estate

Tai Wo Hau is a place in Tsuen Wan across Tsuen Wan District and Kwai Tsing District. Its area mainly includes Tai Wo Hau Estate, Kwai Yin Court, Kwai Yung Court, and private buildings along Texaco Road. It also includes Kwok Shui Road (the villages, MTR Tai Wo Hau station, Primrose Hill) at the north of Castle Peak Road.

== Education ==
Tai Wo Hau is in Primary One Admission (POA) School Net 65, which includes multiple aided schools (schools operated independently of the government but funded with government money); none of the schools in the net are government schools.

== Others ==
- Tai Wo Hau Estate
- Tai Wo Hau station
- Texaco Road
- Ham Tin Tsuen
- Ho Pui Tsuen
- Hoi Pa New Village
- Kwan Mun Hau Tsuen
- Yeung Uk Tsuen
