= Tsuen Wan New Town =

Town in New Territories, Hong Kong

Coordinates: 22.3737°N 114.1163°E

Tsuen Wan 荃灣
- New town
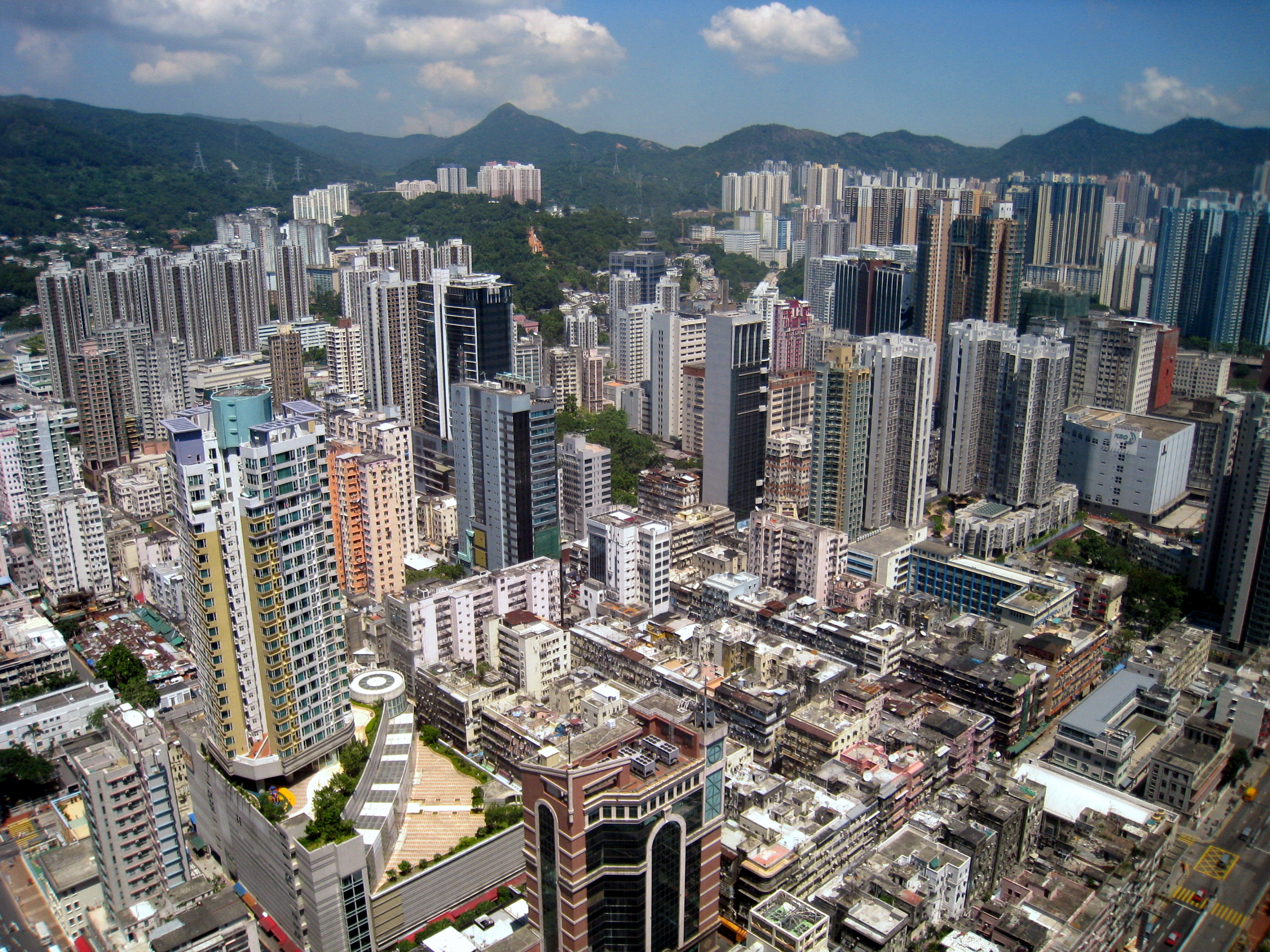
- Overview of Tsuen Wan city centre
- Interactive map of Tsuen Wan
- SAR: Hong Kong
- Region: New Territories
- District: Tsuen Wan and Kwai Tsing

Area
  - Total: 32.85 km^{2} (12.68 sq mi)

Population (2012)
  - Total: 855,804
  - Density: 35,658/km^{2} (92,350/sq mi)

Tsuen Wan New Town
- Traditional Chinese: 荃灣新市鎮
- Cantonese Yale: Tsyùhn wāan sān shíh dzan
Transcriptions
Hakka
- Romanization: Cien2 van1 sin1 si4 zin3
Yue: Cantonese
- Yale Romanization: Tsyùhn wāan sān shíh dzan
- Jyutping: Cyun4 waan1 san1 si5 zan3

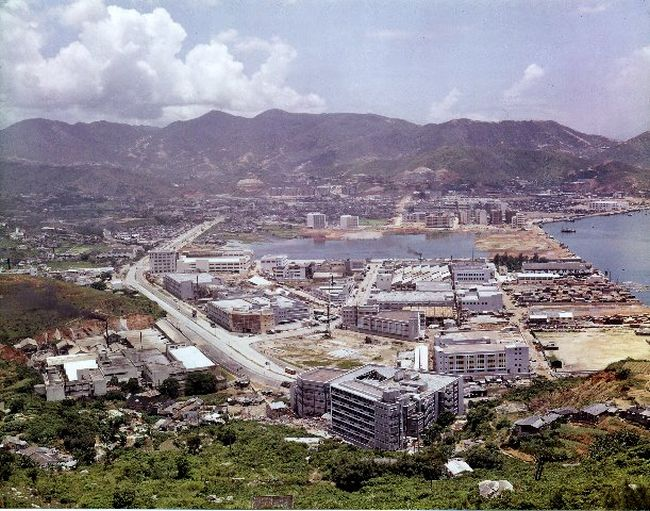
the area of Tsuen Wan New Town in 1961

Tsuen Wan New Town is a new town in Hong Kong. It spans Tsuen Wan, Kwai Chung and the eastern part of Tsing Yi Island. Traditionally, the administrative officials of Tsuen Wan managed the area of Tsuen Wan proper, Kwai Chung, Tsing Yi Island, Ma Wan and Northeast Lantau Island. Its total development area is about 24 square kilometres (9.3 sq mi). The population of the new town is approximately 801,800, with the planned capacity being 845,000.

Development of the Tsuen Wan satellite town commenced in the 1950s, along with Kwun Tong satellite town. In 1961, the government of Hong Kong decided to expand the satellite town into neighbouring Kwai Chung and Tsing Yi, and Tsuen Wan New Town was established as the first new town in Hong Kong. In 1982, the Tsuen Wan District was created under the District Administration Scheme. In 1985, with the explosion of population in the new town, Kwai Chung and Tsing Yi were spun off to form the new Kwai Tsing District. Thus, the town is now under two administrative districts. In some recent official reports, Kwai Chung New Town and Tsing Yi New Town are separated from Tsuen Wan New Town.

Despite being a part of the New Territories, the town is also considered a part of the Hong Kong metro area by the Planning Department and Urban Renewal Authority. Along with Hong Kong Island and Kowloon, it is the only area in the New Territories classified as the core urban area of Hong Kong. Part of this is because the town was developed early and is not geographically separated from Kowloon by hills. Also, there are no New Territories taxis service within most parts of the town, unlike other new towns in the New Territories.

== See also ==
- List of places in Hong Kong
