= Tsuen Wan District =

District in Hong Kong

Tsuen Wan 荃灣區
- District
- Tsuen Wan District
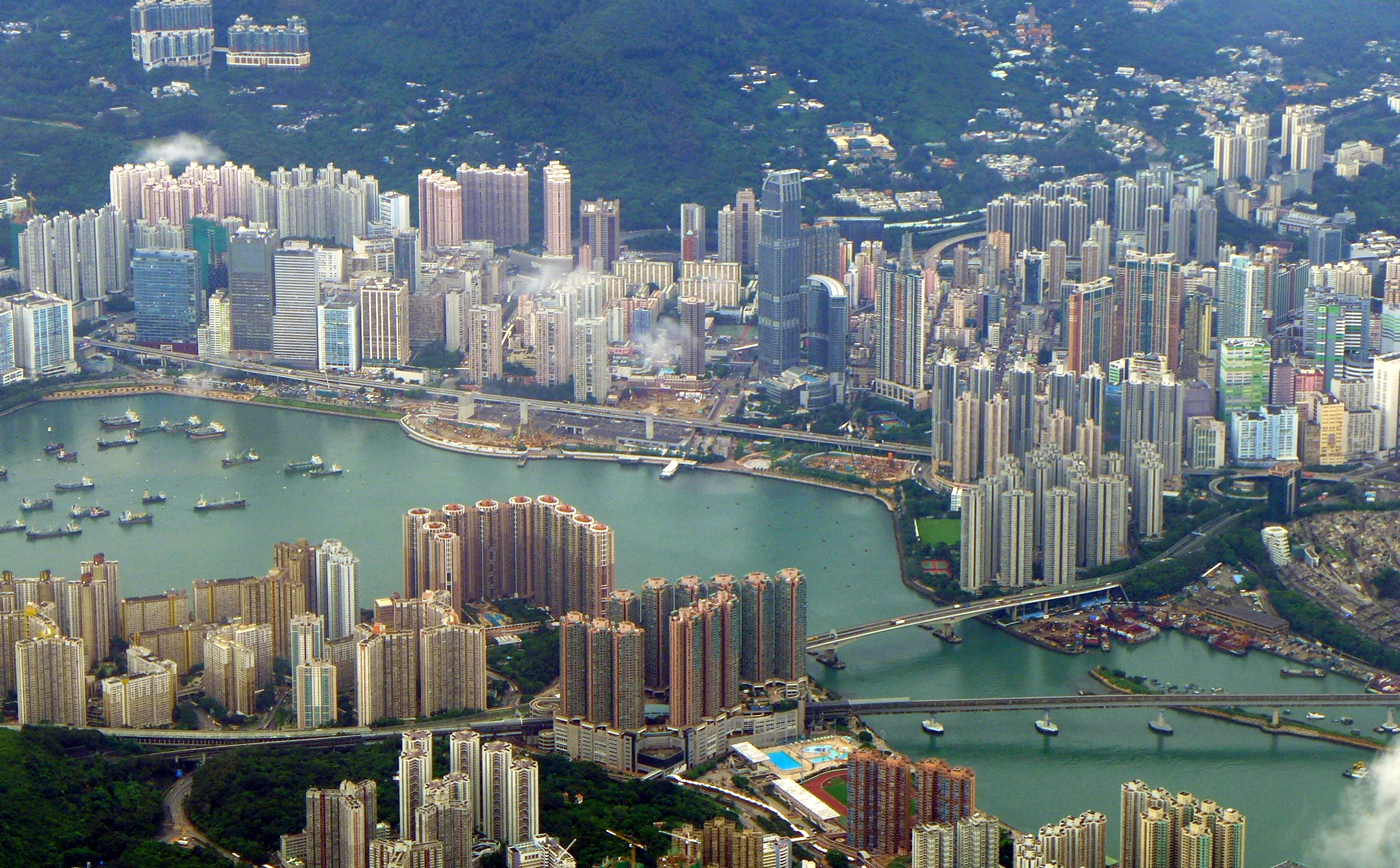
- Day view of Tsuen Wan District

- Location of Tsuen Wan District within Hong Kong
- Coordinates: 22°21′46″N 114°07′45″E
- Sovereign State: China
- SAR: Hong Kong
- Constituencies: 17

Government
  - District Council Chairman: Sumly Chan Yuen Sum
  - District Council Vice-Chairman: Yau Kam Ping

Area
  - Total: 60.70 km^{2} (23.44 sq mi)

Population (2016)
  - Total: 318,916
  - Density: 5,254/km^{2} (13,610/sq mi)
- Time zone: UTC+8 (Hong Kong Time)
- Location of district office and district council: 174-208 Castle Peak Road – Tsuen Wan[[]], Tsuen Wan
- Website: Tsuen Wan District Council

Tsuen Wan District
- Traditional Chinese: 荃灣區
- Simplified Chinese: 荃湾区
- Cantonese Yale: Tsyùhn Wāan Kēui
- Jyutping: Cyun4 waan1 keoi1
Transcriptions
Standard Mandarin
- Hanyu Pinyin: Quánwānqū
Hakka
- Romanization: Cien^{2} van^{1}
Yue: Cantonese
- Yale Romanization: Tsyùhn Wāan Kēui
- Jyutping: Cyun4 waan1 keoi1
- IPA: [tsʰyn˩.wan˥ kʰɵɥ˥]

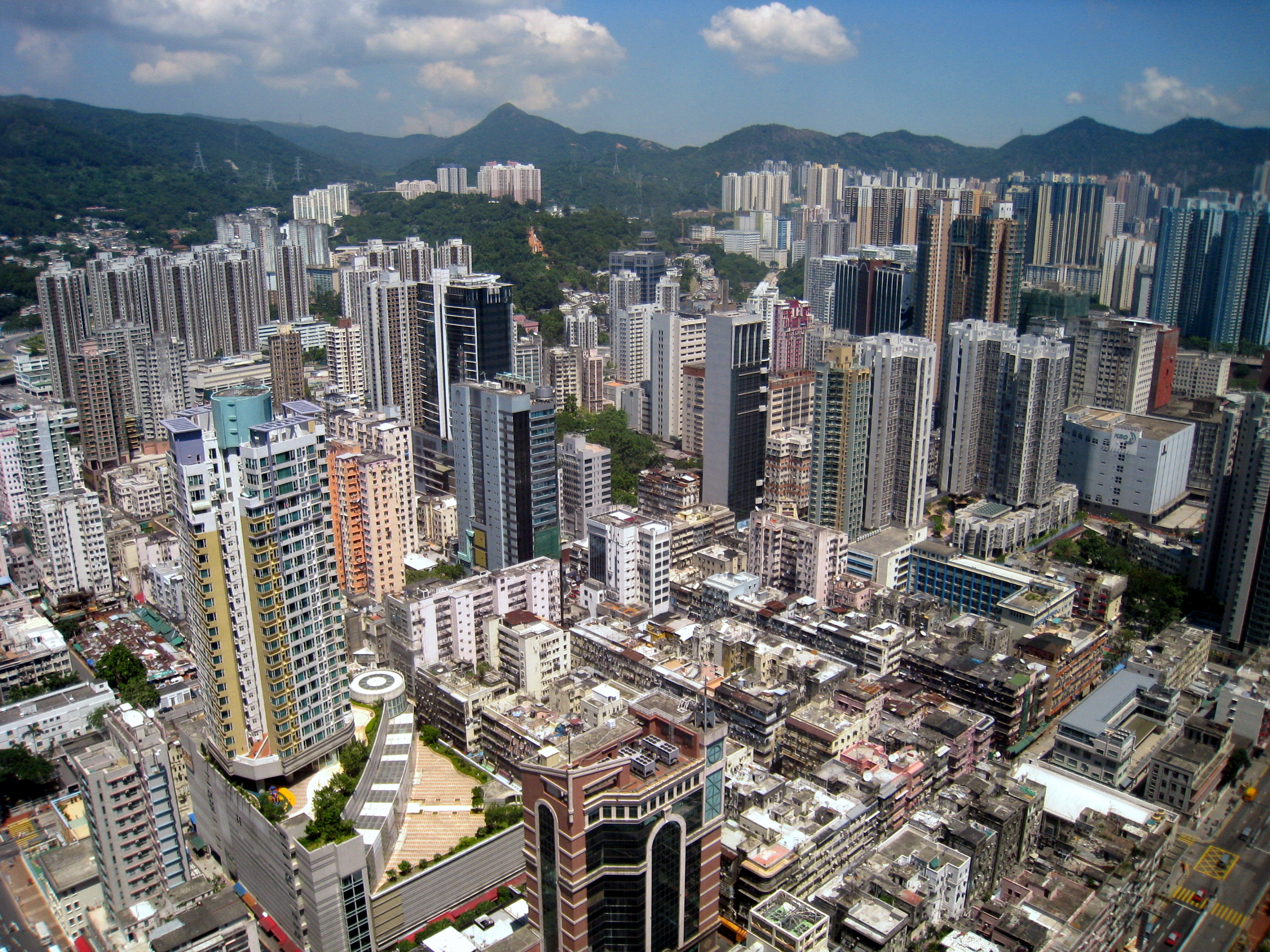
The buildings in Tsuen Wan Town

Tsuen Wan District is one of the 18 districts of Hong Kong. It is located in the New Territories and is served by the Tsuen Wan line and Tuen Ma line of the MTR metro system. Its area is 60.7 km^{2}. Its residents, who mostly live in Tsuen Wan Town, enjoy the highest income in the New Territories.

Part of the Tsuen Wan New Town is located in the Tsuen Wan District. An exclave of the district is located on the island of Ma Wan and the northeastern part of Lantau island (including Tsing Chau Tsai Peninsula and Yam O).

The Hong Kong Disneyland Resort is within the boundary of Tsuen Wan District (and partially in the neighbouring Islands District).

== History ==
The district was set up in 1982 covering the present-day Tsuen Wan District and Kwai Tsing District. Kwai Chung and the island of Tsing Yi were split from Tsuen Wan District in the mid-1980s, and subsequently formed a new district known as Kwai Tsing.

== Sights ==
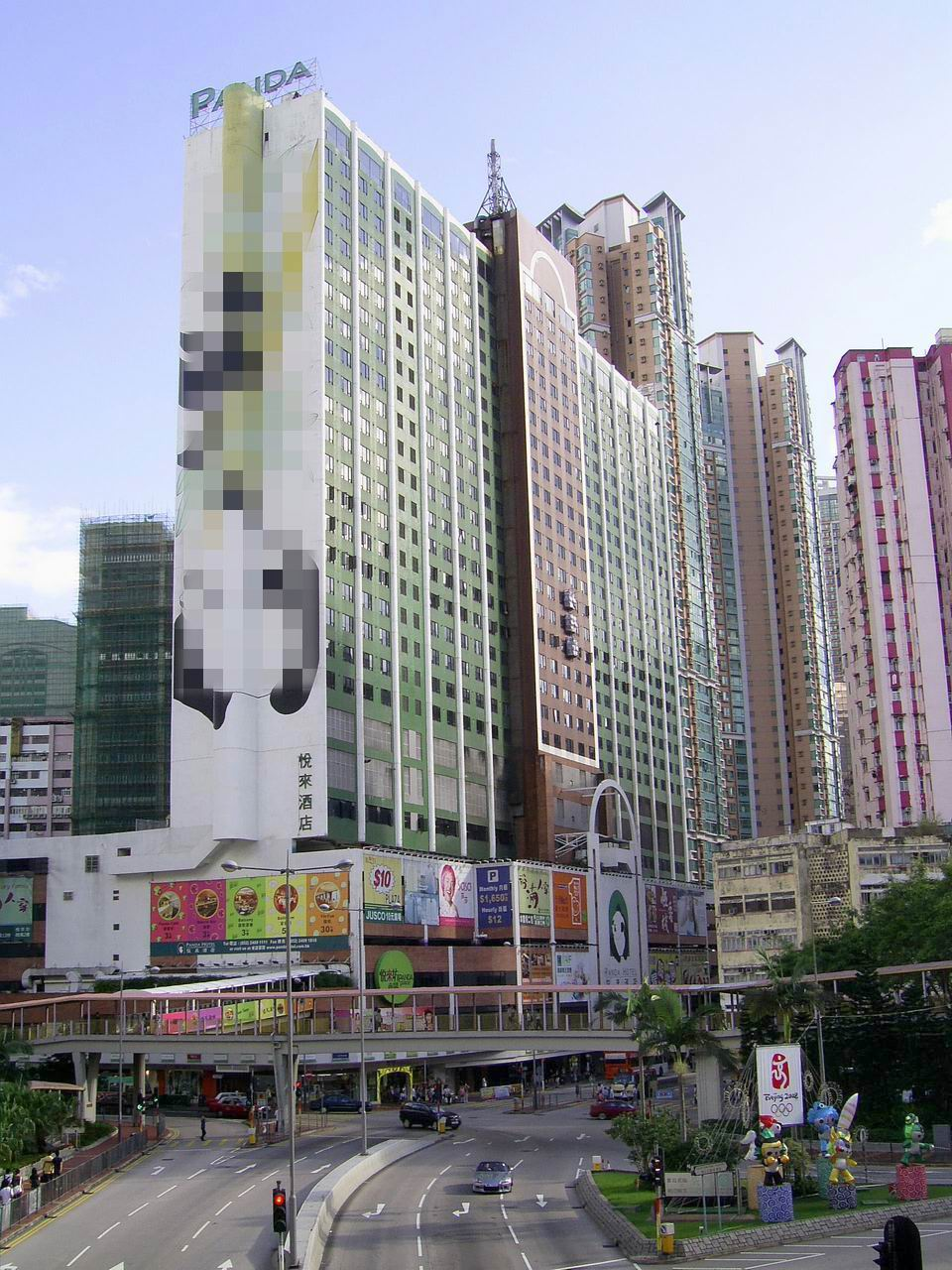
The Panda Hotel in Tsuen Wan Town

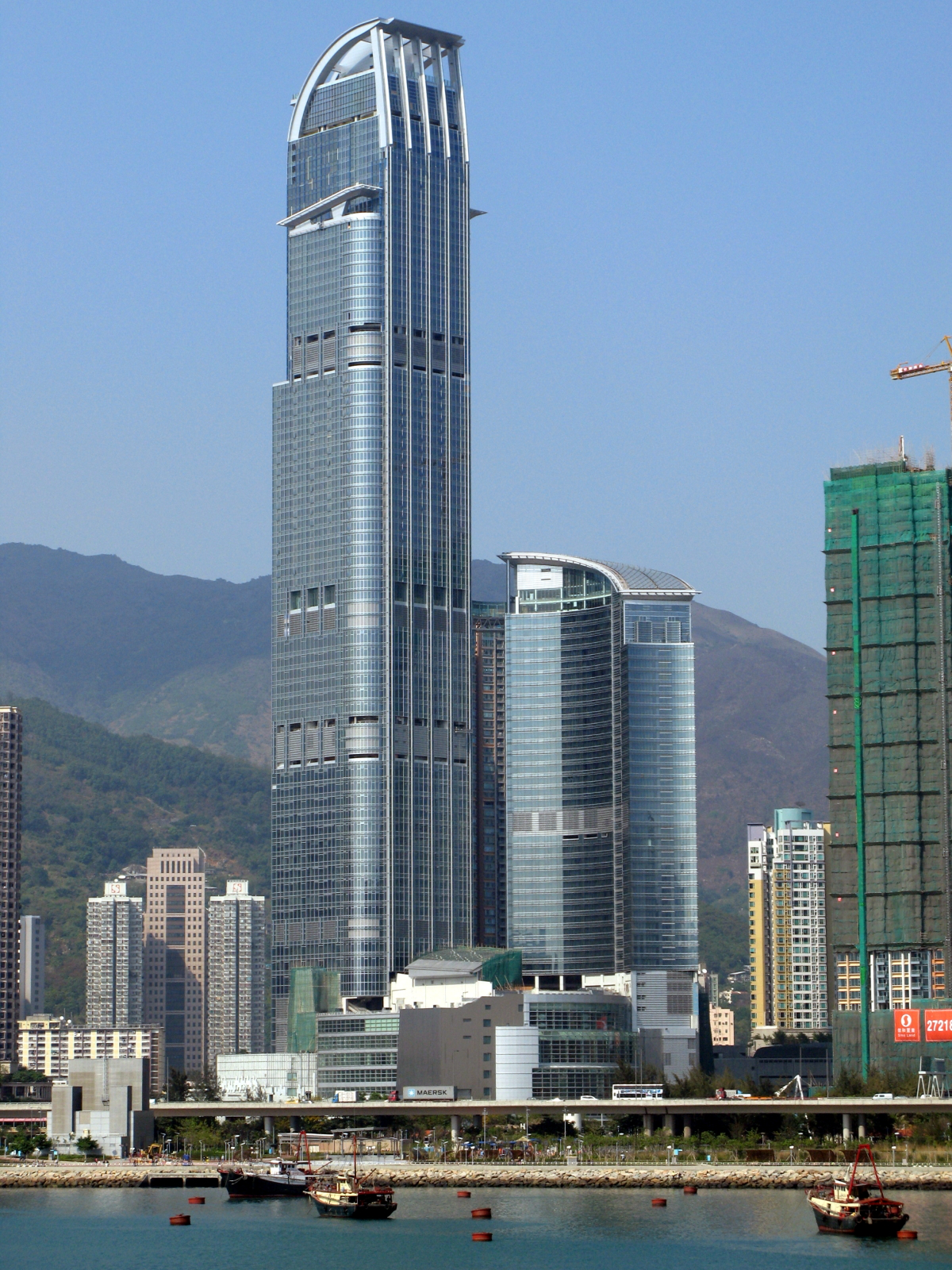
Nina Tower in Tsuen Wan West

The Sam Tung Uk Museum is a cultural and agricultural museum and was set up in a former Hakka walled village. Behind Tsuen Wan is Shing Mun reservoir, a valley that was once home to 10 villages that grew mostly pineapples. The dam that stops the reservoir is called Po Lo Pa, lit. pineapple dam. There were once disputes and fights among the Shing Mun Valley dwellers and Tsuen Wan residents during the 18th century, over the levying of taxes for pineapple sales. The reservoir valley also has a disused lead mine, where some of the residents of Tsuen Wan used to work. Behind this is Tai Mo Shan, the tallest hill in Hong Kong.

== Islands ==
The following islands of Hong Kong are administratively part of the district:

- Cheung Sok
- Ma Wan
- Ngam Hau Shek (岩口石)
- Pun Shan Shek (半山石)
- Tang Lung Chau
- Northeastern part of Lantau Island

== Transportation ==
=== MTR ===
- Tsuen Wan line of the MTR metro system. Tsuen Wan station is the terminus of the line. Tai Wo Hau station is also at Tsuen Wan District.
- Tuen Ma line also has a station at the coastal area of Tsuen Wan Town, named Tsuen Wan West station.
- Disneyland Resort line operates within the district, in the northern part of Lantau Island, consisting Sunny Bay station and Disneyland Resort station.

=== Bus ===
There are also tens of bus routes serving Tsuen Wan, mostly operated by Kowloon Motor Bus. Citybus also operates a few.

Park Island Transport Co., Ltd. operates bus services between Park Island on Ma Wan and Tsing Yi MTR station, Park Island and Kwai Fong Metroplaza, Park Island and Hong Kong International Airport; Park Island and Tsuen Wan (close to the Tsuen Wan MTR station).

=== Ferry ===
Park Island Transport Co., Ltd. operates ferry services between Park Island on Ma Wan and Central and between Park Island and Tsuen Wan Pier (next to the Tsuen Wan West MTR station).

== See also ==
- List of areas of Hong Kong
- Footbridge Network in Tsuen Wan
