= Tsung Yuen Ha =

Village in Ta Kwu Ling, Hong Kong

Coordinates: 22.552242°N 114.15706°E

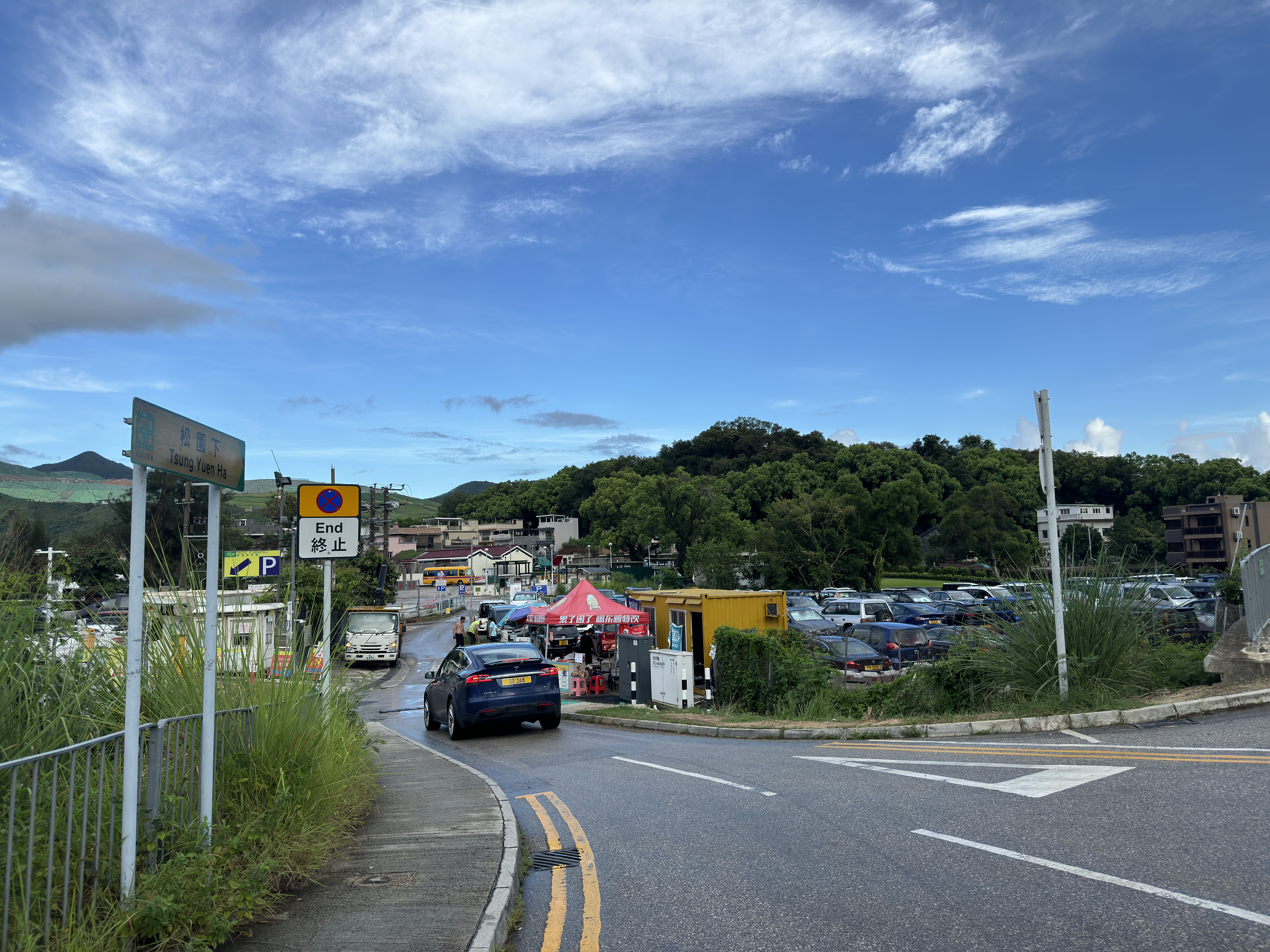
Tsung Yuen Ha viewed from Lin Ma Hang Road

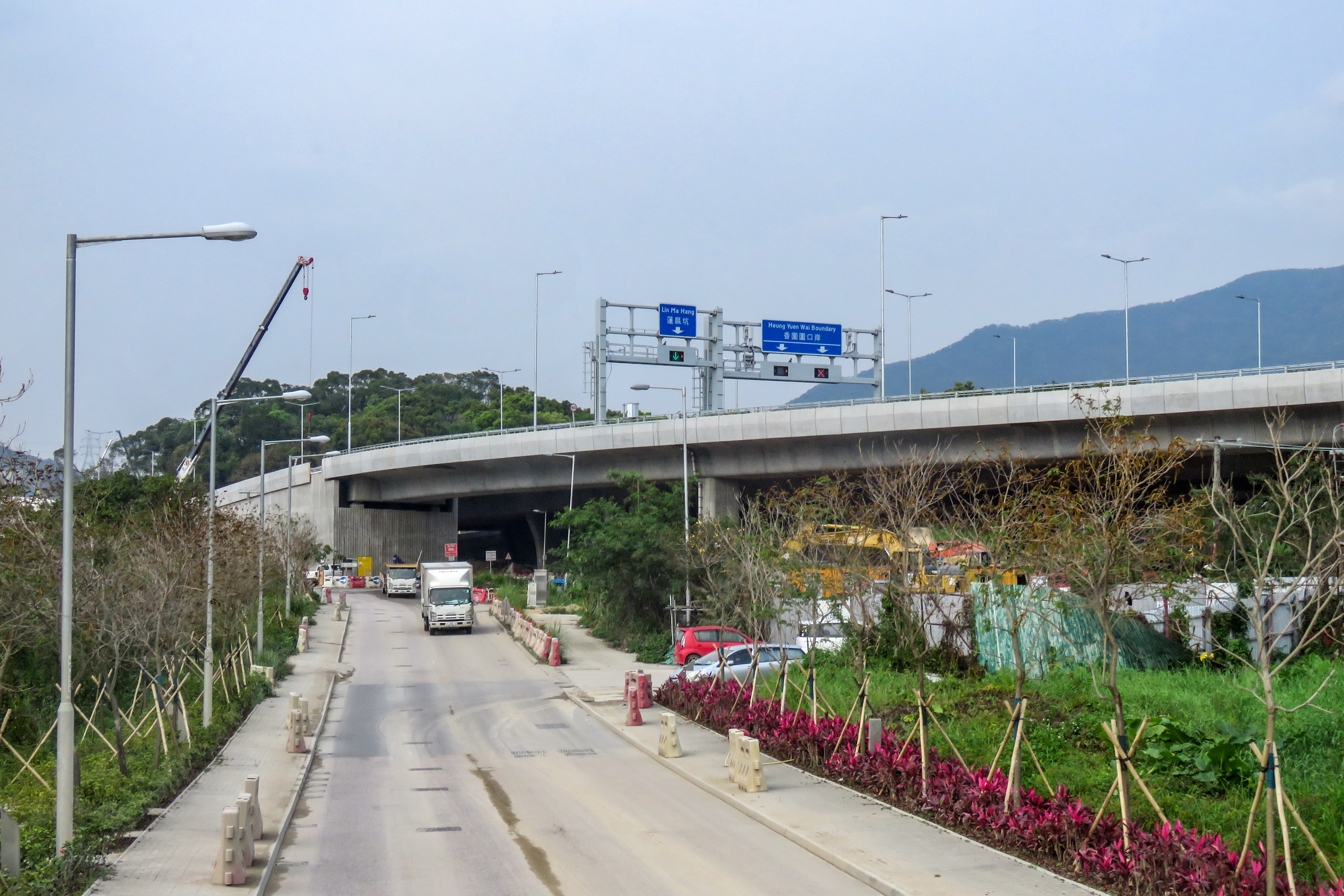
Lin Ma Hang Road and Heung Yuen Wai Highway in Tsung Yuen Ha.

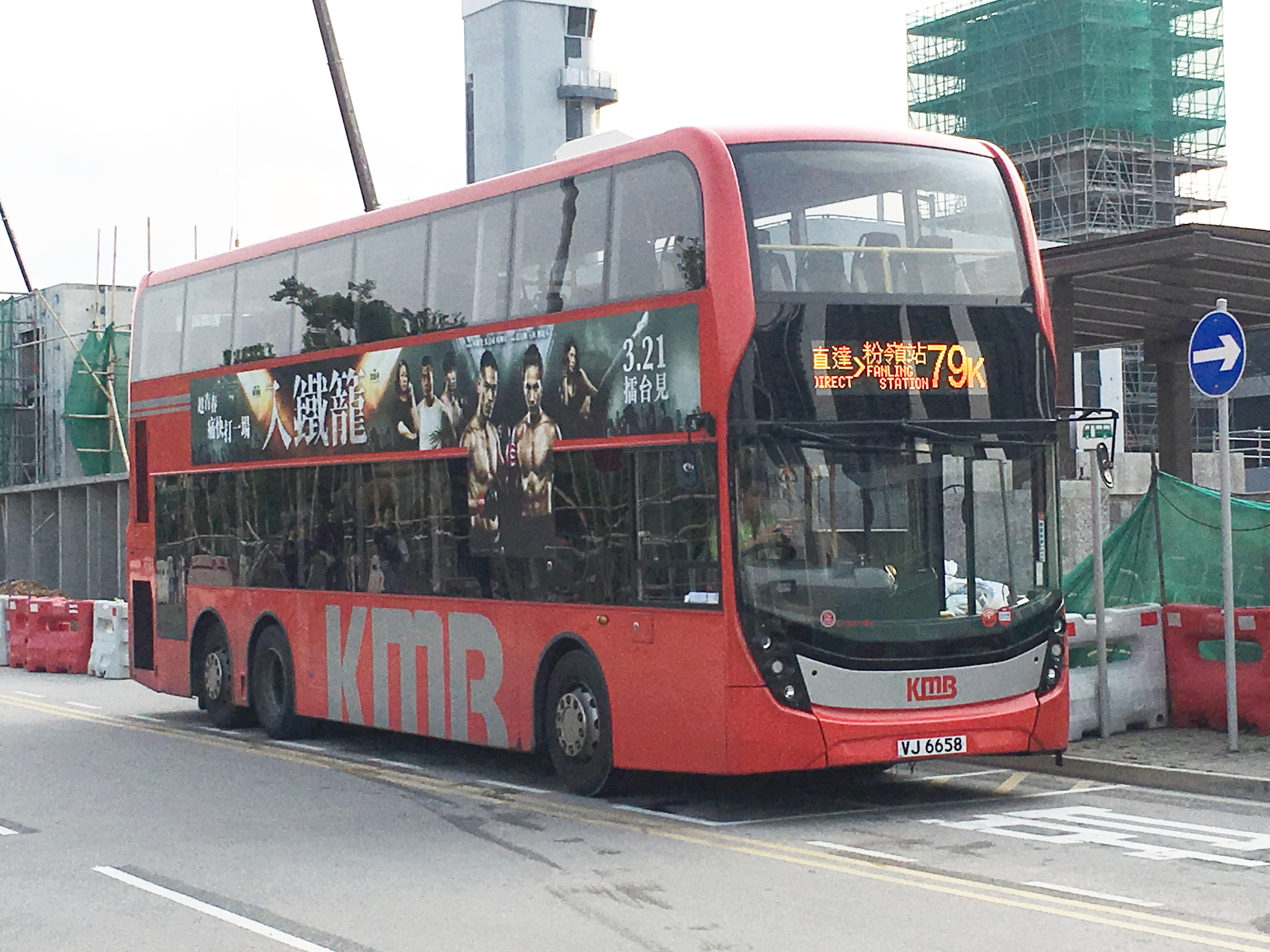
Bus KMB 79K at Ta Kwu Ling (Tsung Yuen Ha) Bus Terminus.

Tsung Yuen Ha (Chinese: 松園下) is a village in Ta Kwu Ling, North District, Hong Kong.

== Administration ==
Tsung Yuen Ha is a recognised village under the New Territories Small House Policy and represented within the Ta Kwu Ling District Rural Committee. For electoral purposes, it is in the Sha Ta constituency, currently represented by Ko Wai-kei.

== Population ==
At the time of the 1911 census, Tsung Yuen Ha had 46 females and 39 males.

== See also ==
- Heung Yuen Wai Control Point
