= Heung Yuen Wai Highway =

Highway in Hong Kong

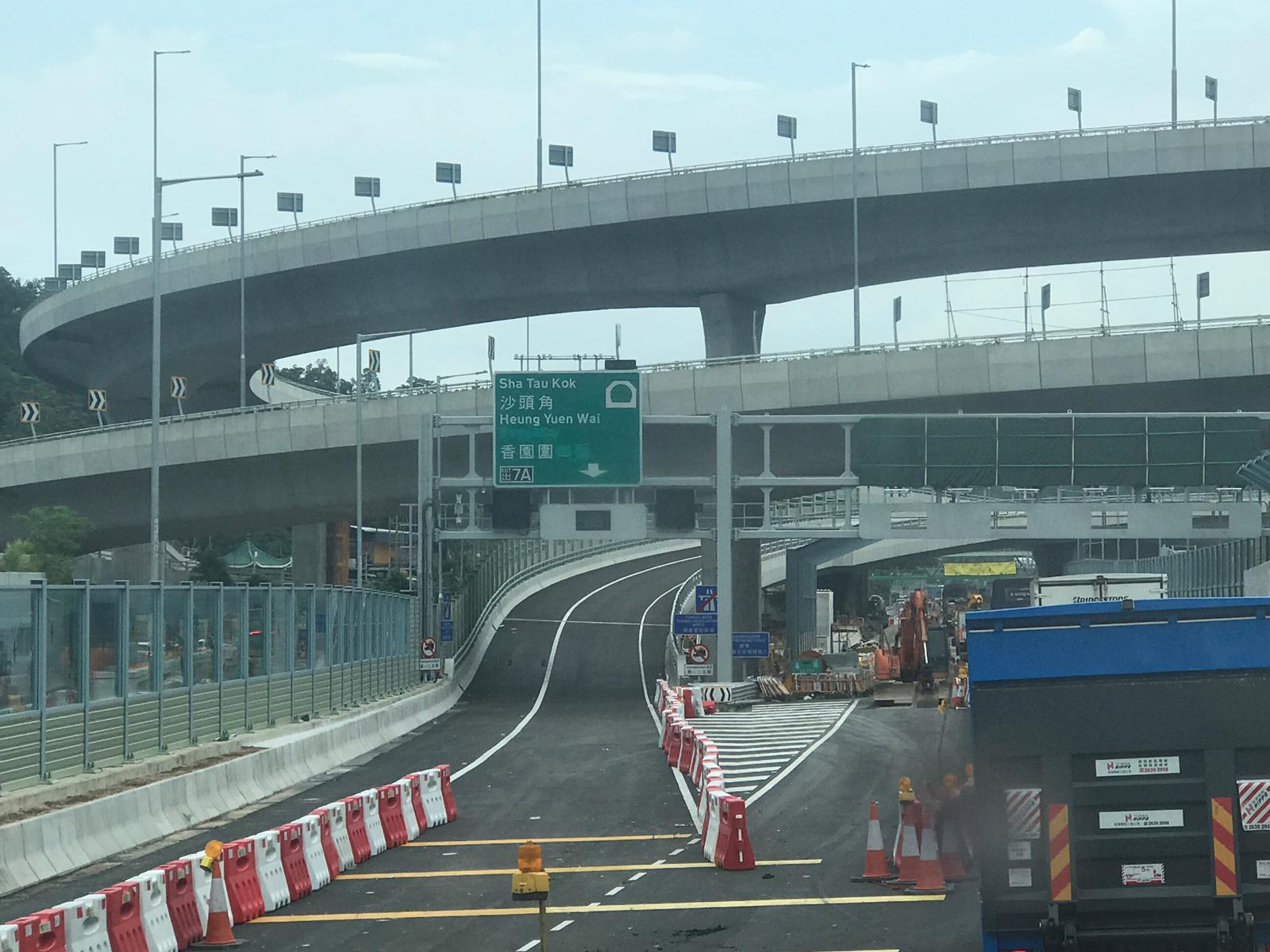
- Heung Yuen Wai Highway Cloudy Hill northbound entrance

Route information
- Maintained by the Highways Department
- Length: 11.1 km (6.9 mi)
- Existed: 26 May 2019; 7 years ago–present

Major junctions
- South end: Route 9 in Kau Lung Hang
- Sha Tau Kok Road
- North end: Heung Yuen Wai Control Point

Location
- Country: China
- Special administrative region: Hong Kong

Highway system
- Transport in Hong Kong; Routes; Roads and Streets

Heung Yuen Wai Highway, also abbreviated as HYWH, (Chinese: 香園圍公路; Jyutping: hoeng1 jyun4 wai4 gung1 lou6) is a controlled-access highway in North District, New Territories, Hong Kong. It diverges from Fanling Highway of Route 9 at Kau Lung Hang, crosses Sha Tau Kok Road and connects to Heung Yuen Wai Control Point, a border checkpoint between Hong Kong and China which opened for freight traffic on 26 August 2020.

The highway comprises three parts — Lung Shan Tunnel, Cheung Shan Tunnel, and 5.5 kilometres (3.4 mi) of viaducts and at-grade roads. At 4.8 kilometres (3.0 mi), Lung Shan Tunnel is the longest land road tunnel in Hong Kong. It boasts two lanes in each direction, with a posted speed limit of 80 kilometres per hour.

== Route description ==
The southern terminus of Heung Yuen Wai Highway, known as Fanling Highway Interchange, is where four viaducts connect the highway to Fanling Highway. Built using the balanced cantilever method, the viaducts were assembled from 1,300 pieces of precast concrete segments.

The highway travels northeastward as a dual-tube tunnel under Bird's Hill (also known as Lung Shan, Chinese: 龍山) called Lung Shan Tunnel. The 4.8-kilometre (3.0 mi) tunnel is the longest land-based road tunnel in Hong Kong, 0.85 kilometres (0.53 mi) longer than the previous record holder Tate's Cairn Tunnel. Construction of the section from Fanling Highway Interchange to Lau Shui Heung involved the drill-and-blast method, whereas the segment from Lau Shui Heung to Sha Tau Kok Road Interchange was constructed with a tunnel boring machine (TBM).

Upon leaving Lung Shan Tunnel, the highway will arrive at the Sha Tau Kok Road Interchange to the west of Loi Tung village, where it crosses Sha Tau Kok Road. It then travels northwestward in the form of a 700-metre (0.43 mi) dual-tube tunnel called Cheung Shan Tunnel, named after the hill it passes under. Leaving the tunnel at Wo Keng Shan Road, the highway continues northwestward to Ping Yeung and thence to its intersection with Lin Ma Hang Road. The highway ends at the Heung Yuen Wai Control Point.

Despite being a controlled-accessed highway with grade-separated interchanges, Heung Yuen Wai Highway has not been designated as an expressway under the Road Traffic Ordinance (Cap. 374, Laws of Hong Kong), nor does it belong to any of the territory's numbered routes.

== History ==
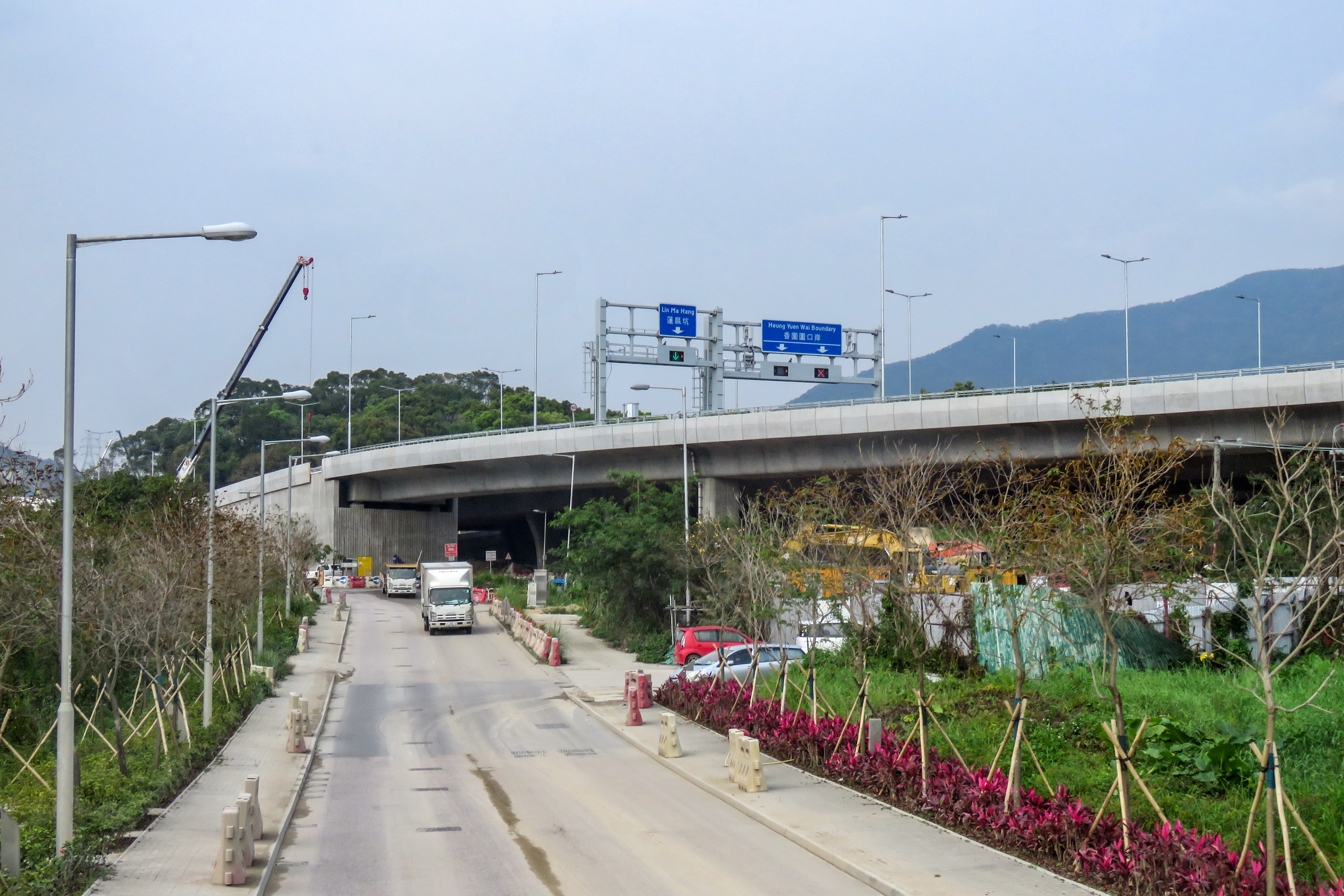
Lin Ma Hang Road Interchange where Heung Yuen Wai Highway (on the viaduct) is connected to Lin Ma Hang Road

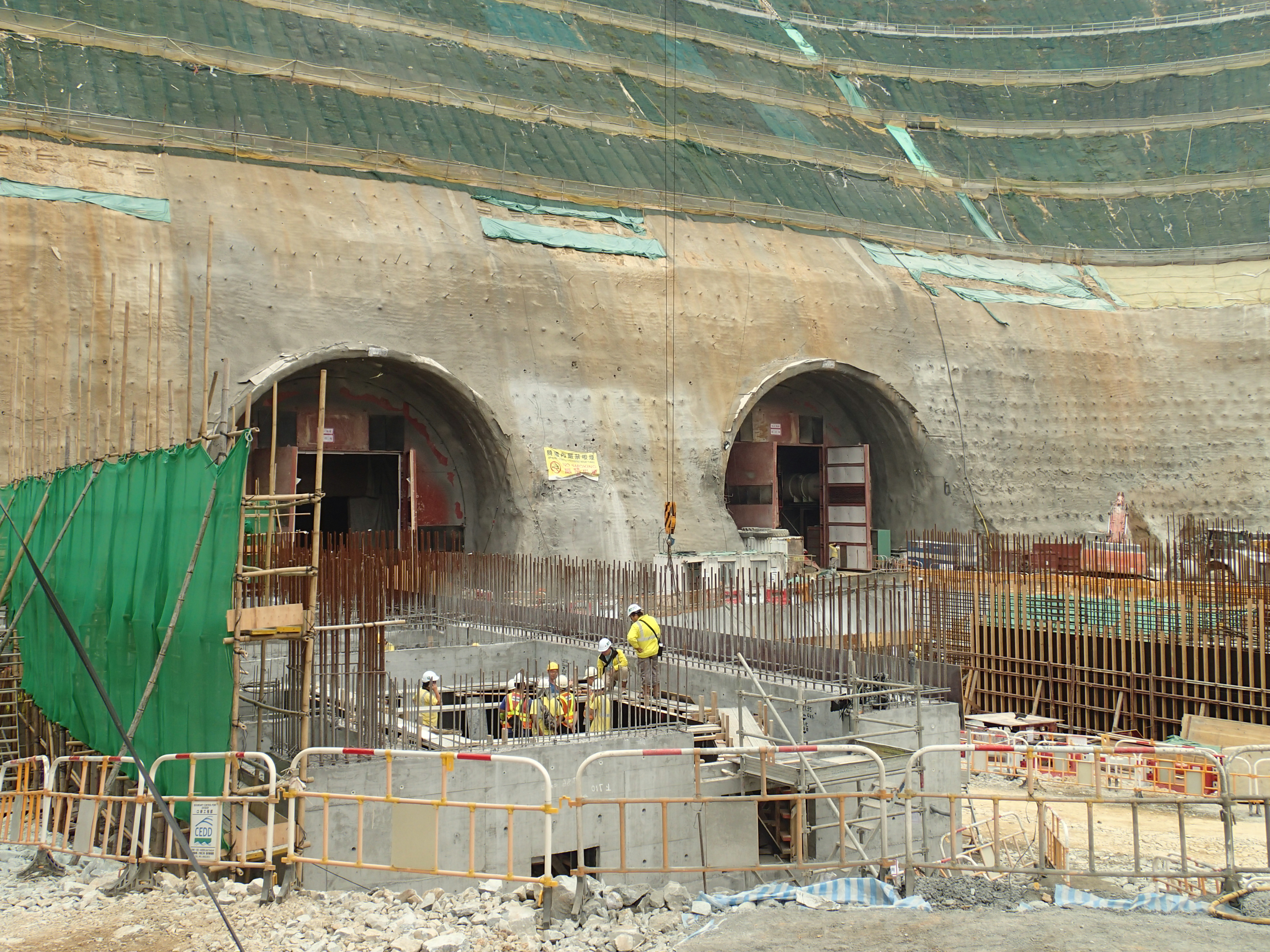
Southern portal of Cheung Shan Tunnel under construction (March 2017)

The construction of Heung Yuen Wai Highway stemmed from the signing of Memorandum on Closer Co-operation between Hong Kong and Shenzhen in 2006, which calls for an investigation into the feasibility of building a new link between Hong Kong and China known as the Shenzhen Eastern Corridor. In September 2008 a decision was made jointly by the Hong Kong and Shenzhen governments to undertake the construction of the Liantang/Heung Yuen Wai Boundary Control Point, to be connected to Hong Kong's existing highway network by way of a dual two-lane trunk Connecting Road.

The contract to construct Lung Shan Tunnel was awarded to Dragages-Bouygues Joint Venture at HK$10.314 billion. It was named Tunnelling Project of the Year in the 2019 Tunnelling Awards organized by New Civil Engineer. Meanwhile, the construction contracts for the Fanling Highway Interchange and the section between Sha Tau Kok Road and Lin Ma Hang Road were awarded to Chun Wo Construction and Engineering Company Limited and CRBC-CEC-KADEN Joint Venture respectively, at costs of HK$2.545 billion and HK$6.518 billion. Also included in the Chun Wo contract was the widening of Fanling Highway.

The highway was opened to traffic at 8 a.m. on 26 May 2019.

== Interchanges ==
District	Location	km	mi	Destinations	Notes
Tai Po	Kau Lung Hang	0.0– 1.1	0.0– 0.68	Route 9 – Tai Po, Kowloon, Fanling, Sheung Shui	Southern terminus
Tai Po – North	Kau Lung Hang – Loi Tung	1.4– 6.2	0.87– 3.9	Lung Shan Tunnel	
North	Loi Tung	6.3– 6.9	3.9– 4.3	Sha Tau Kok Road – Wo Hang / Wo Keng Shan Road – Sha Tau Kok	Roundabout
North	Cheung Shan	7.1– 7.8	4.4– 4.8	Cheung Shan Tunnel	
North	Ta Kwu Ling	9.0– 9.8	5.6– 6.1	Nga Yiu Ha / Ping Yeung	Roundabout
North	Chuk Yuen	10.7– 11.0	6.6– 6.8	Lin Ma Hang Road – Heung Yuen Wai, Lin Ma Hang	Modified diamond interchange
North	Chuk Yuen	11.1	6.9	Heung Yuen Wai Control Point	
1.000 mi = 1.609 km; 1.000 km = 0.621 mi

== See also ==
- Route 9 (Hong Kong)
