= Heung Yuen Wai =

Walled village in Ta Kwu Ling, North District, Hong Kong

Coordinates: 22.55343°N 114.16455°E

- Traditional Chinese: 香園圍
- Cantonese Yale: hēung yùhn wàih
Transcriptions
Yue: Cantonese
- Yale Romanization: hēung yùhn wàih
- Jyutping: hoeng1 jyun4 wai4

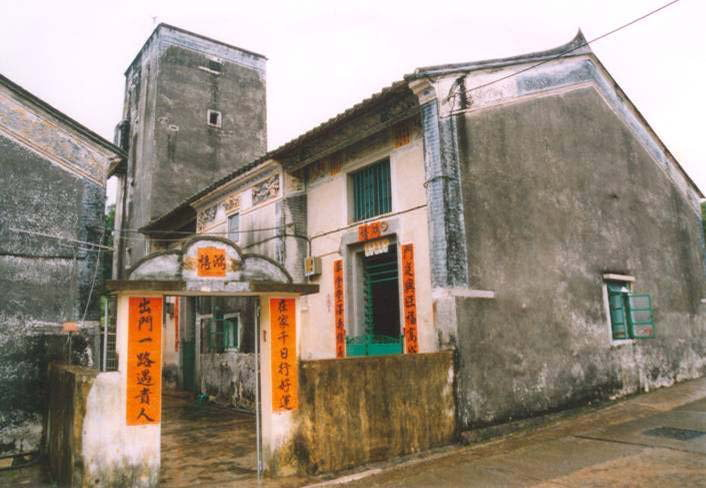
Heung Yuen Wai

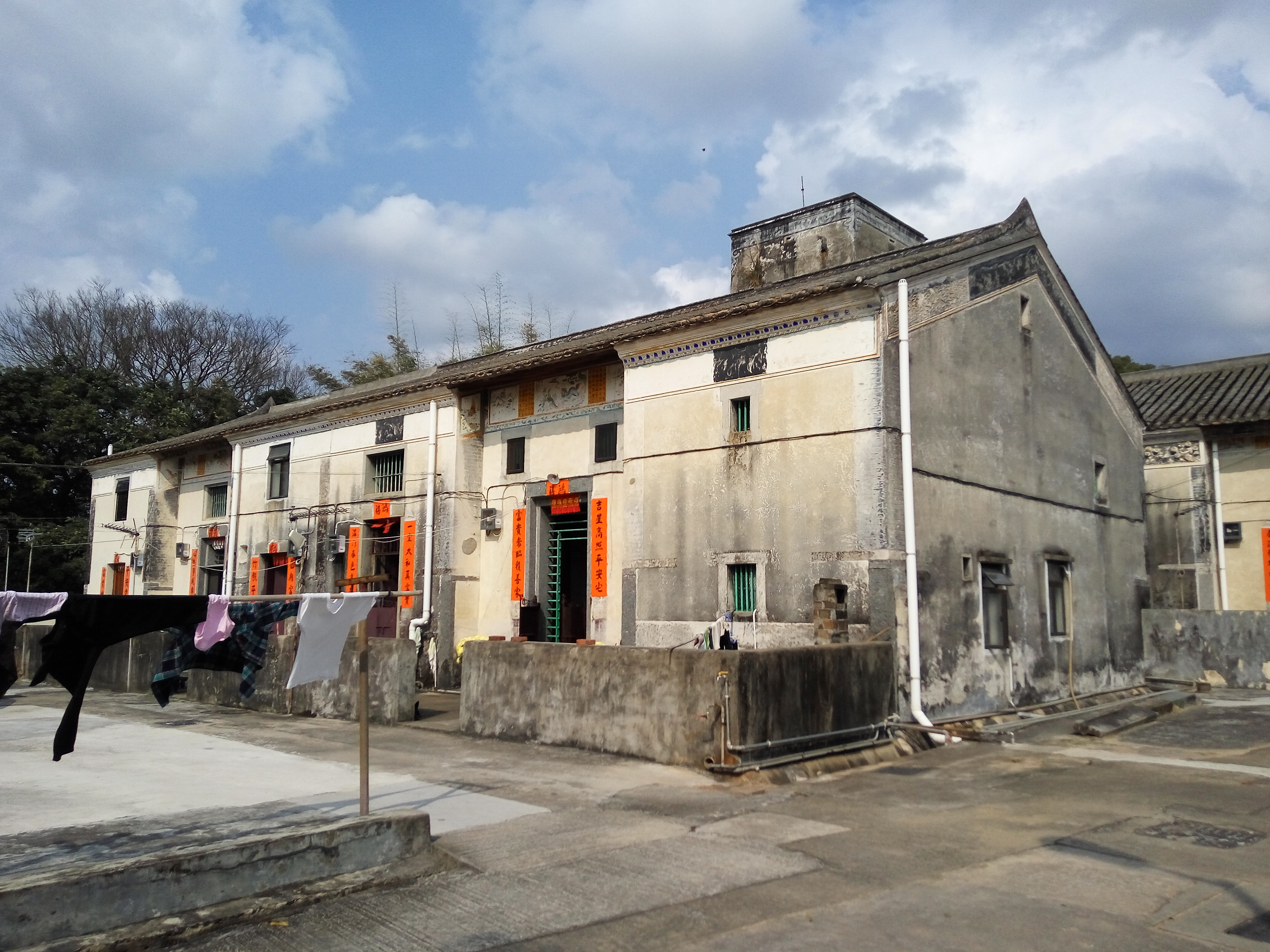
Heung Yuen Wai

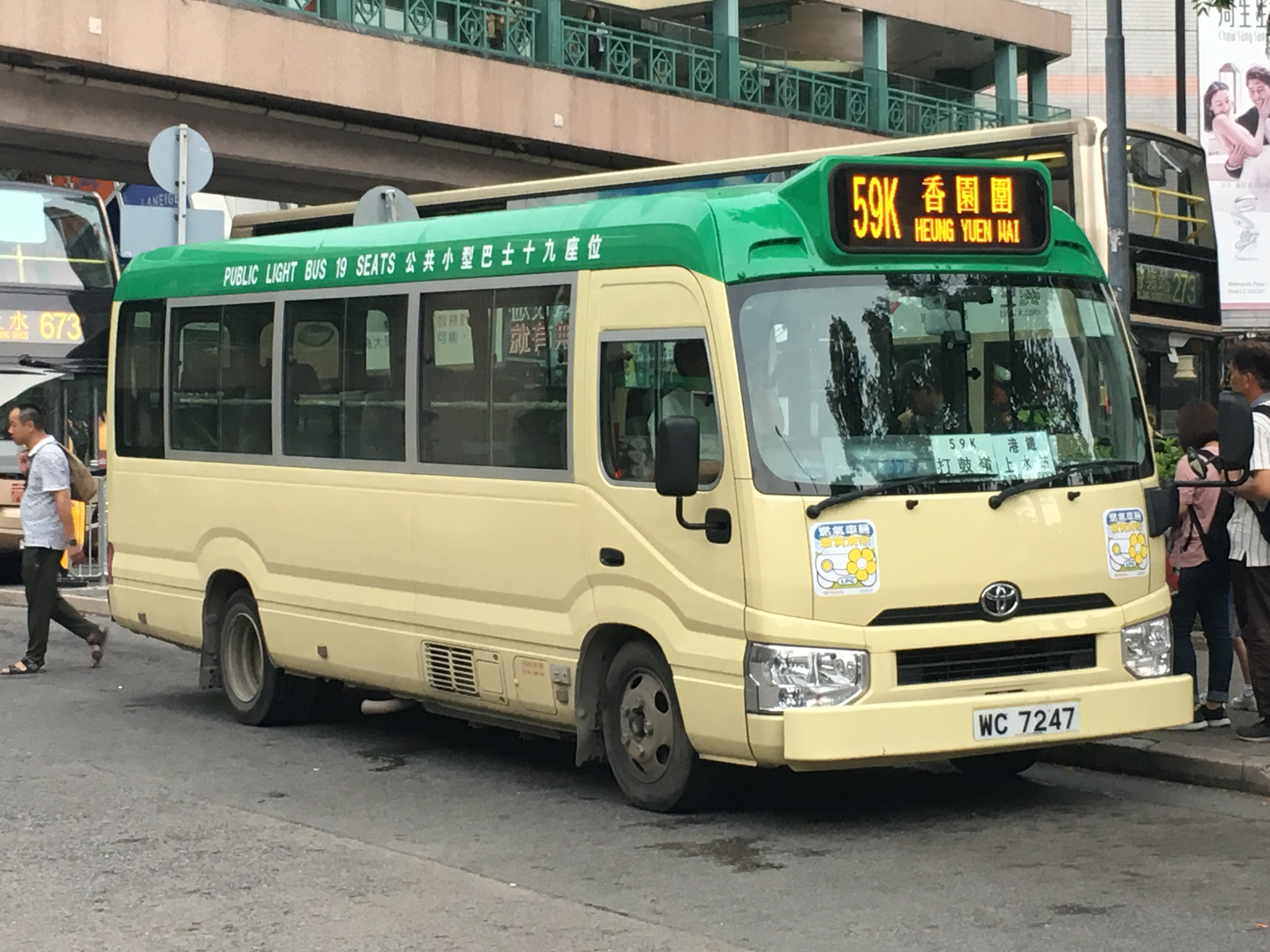
Public light bus at Sheung Shui Bus Terminus, serving Heung Yuen Wai.

Heung Yuen Wai (Chinese: 香園圍) is a walled village in Ta Kwu Ling, North District, Hong Kong.

== Administration ==
Heung Yuen Wai is a recognized village under the New Territories Small House Policy. It is one of the villages represented within the Ta Kwu Ling District Rural Committee. For electoral purposes, Heung Yuen Wai is part of the Sha Ta constituency, which is currently represented by Ko Wai-kei.

== History ==
Heung Yuen Wai is a village of the Man (萬) Clan established around 1825. It appears on the "Map of the San-On District", published in 1866 by Simeone Volonteri.

== Access ==
Road Access to Heung Yuen Wai must go through via Lin Ma Hang Road from Ping Che Road or Heung Yuen Wai Highway.

== See also ==
- Walled villages of Hong Kong
- Man Uk Pin
- Lin Ma Hang
- Heung Yuen Wai Control Point
