= Fanling Highway =

Road in Hong Kong

Coordinates: 22.491266°N 114.138828°E

Fanling Highway
- Part of Route 9

Route information
- Maintained by Highways Department
- Length: 10.0 km (6.2 mi)
- Existed: 1987–present

Major junctions
- East end: Tai Po (Tai Hang San Wai)
- 7
- West end: Yuen Long (San Tin Chau Tau)

Location
- Country: China
- Special administrative region: Hong Kong

Highway system
- Transport in Hong Kong; Routes; Roads and Streets

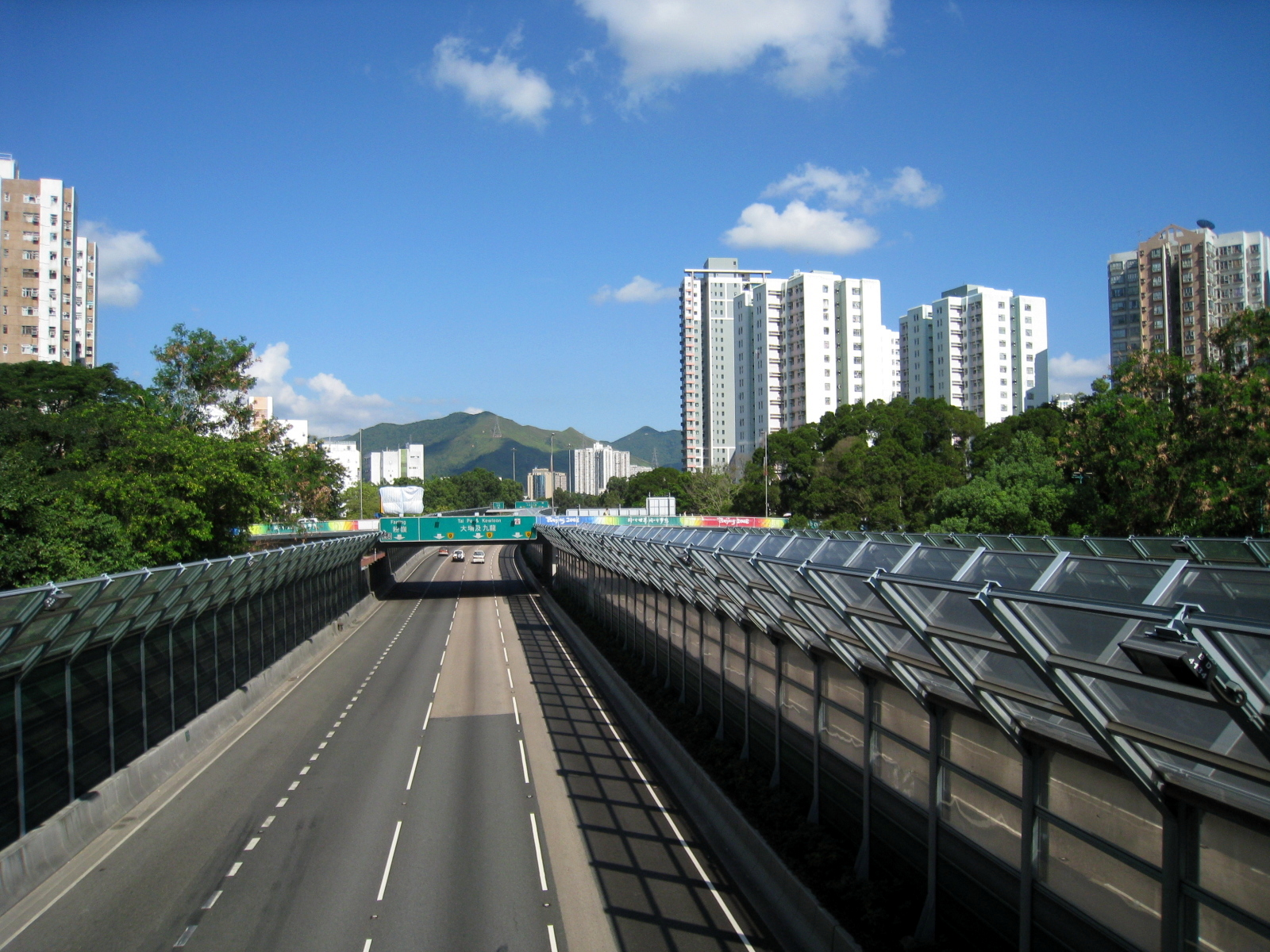
Fanling Highway

Fanling Highway (Chinese: 粉嶺公路) is a part of Route 9 in Hong Kong. It connects the new town of Tai Po and San Tin Highway, passing through Sheung Shui and Fanling on its way. The three lane expressway was constructed between 1983 and 1987.

== Alignment ==
The road succeeds the Tolo Highway at the Lam Kam Interchange where it also interchanges with Tai Wo Service Road West, Lam Kam Road and Tai Po Road. The road then runs to the west of the East Rail line and then passes through the new towns of Fanling and Sheung Shui and diverges from the MTR near Choi Yuen Estate. The road passes through the Kwu Tung area and continues as the San Tin Highway.

== Interchanges ==
Fanling Highway
District	Location	km	Interchange name	Exit	Destinations	Notes
Tai Po	Lam Tsuen Valley	20.2	Lam Kam Road Interchange		Tolo Highway – Tai Po (South), Kowloon	Southern terminus; Route 9 continues
Tai Po	Lam Tsuen Valley	21.2	Lam Kam Road Interchange	7	Lam Kam Road / Tai Wo Service Road West – Hong Lok Yuen, Tai Po (North), Shek Kong	Northbound entrance and southbound exit only
Tai Po	Lam Tsuen Valley	22.7	Fanling Highway Interchange	7A	Heung Yuen Wai Highway – Sha Tau Kok, Heung Yuen Wai Port	Northbound exit and southbound entrance
Tai Po	Lam Tsuen Valley		Fanling Highway Interchange	7A	Tai Wo Service Road East – Kau Lung Hang, Sha Tau Kok, Heung Yuen Wai Port	Northbound entrance and southbound exit Location of Fanling Highway Bus-bus Interchange
North	Fanling	23.9	Wo Hop Shek Interchange	7B	Pak Wo Road – Wo Hop Shek, Wah Ming	Northbound exit and southbound entrance only
North	Fanling	24.2	Wo Hop Shek Interchange	7C	Jockey Club Road – Fanling, Sha Tau Kok	Northbound exit and southbound entrance only
North	Sheung Shui	26.1	Kai Leng Roundabout	8	So Kwun Po Road – Sheung Shui, Fanling	
North	Sheung Shui	26.9	Po Shek Wu Interchange	9	Po Shek Wu Road – Man Kam To, Sheung Shui; Fan Kam Road – Kwu Tung, Shek Kong	
North	Kwu Tung	30.0	Pak Shek Au Interchange	9A	Castle Peak Road - Chau Tau / Kwu Tung Road – Pak Shek Au, San Tin	Northbound exit and southbound entrance only
Yuen Long	Lok Ma Chau	30.8	San Tin Interchange	10B	San Sham Road – Shenzhen (Goods vehicles only)	Northbound exit only
Yuen Long	Lok Ma Chau	31.1	San Tin Interchange	10	San Sham Road – Shenzhen (Passenger vehicles); Castle Peak Road - San Tin – San Tin	Northbound exit and southbound entrance only
Yuen Long	Lok Ma Chau	31.4	San Tin Interchange		San Tin Highway – Yuen Long, Kowloon (via Route 3)	Northern terminus; Route 9 continues
1.000 mi = 1.609 km; 1.000 km = 0.621 mi: Incomplete access; Tolled; Route transition

== See also ==
- Route 9 (Hong Kong)
- Tolo Highway

Preceded by Tolo Highway	Hong Kong Route 9 Fanling Highway	Succeeded by San Tin Highway
