= Lam Kam Road =

Road in New Territories, Hong Kong

- 林錦公路
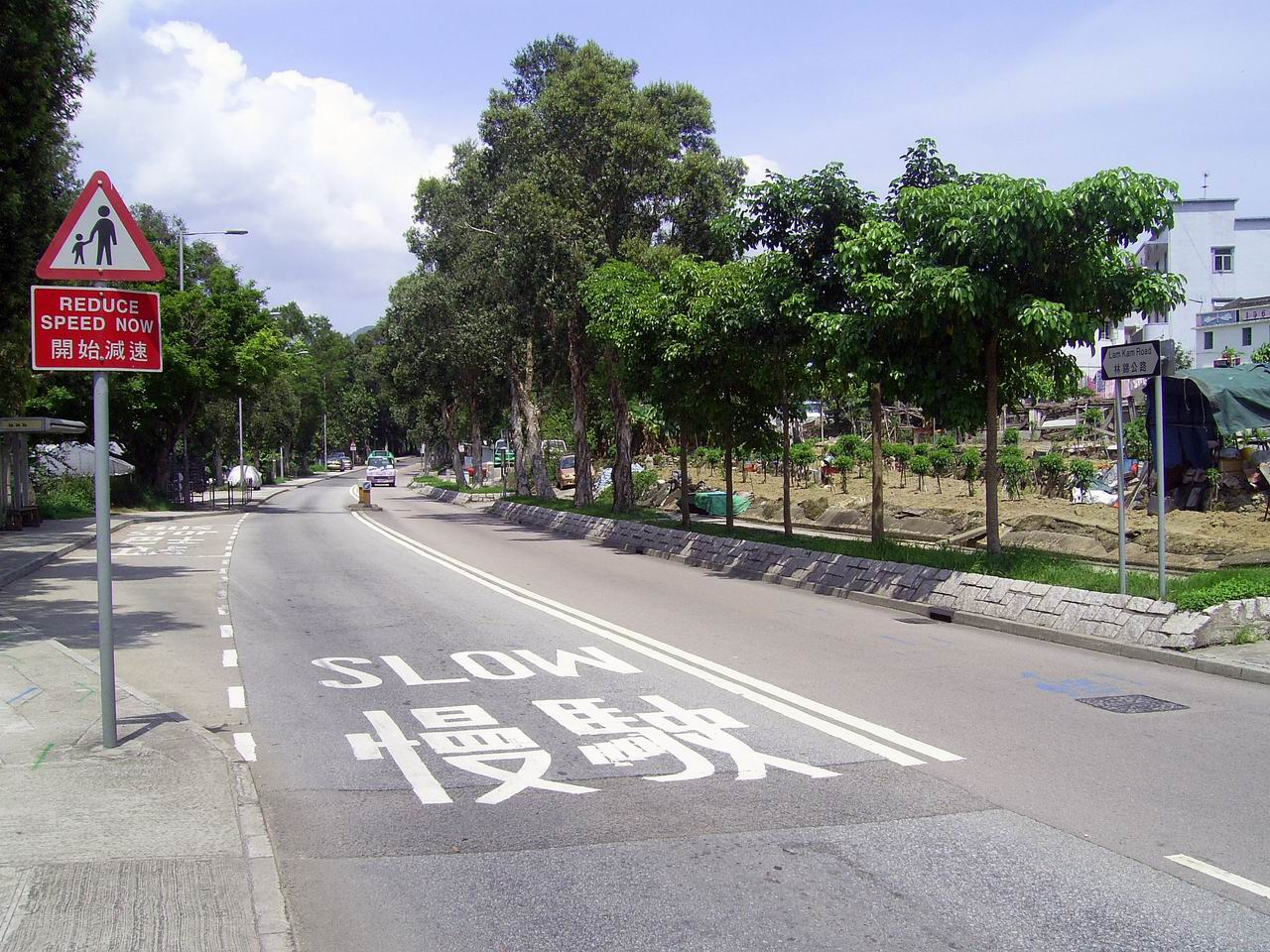
- A flat section of Lam Kam Road in Lam Tsuen Valley
- Interactive map of Lam Kam Road
- Length: 5.7 km (3.5 mi)
- Restrictions: 50 (speed limit)
- Location: New Territories
- East end: Lam Tsuen (Tai Po) interchange with Fanling Highway / Tolo Highway / Tai Wo Service Road West / Tai Po Road – Tai Wo Section
- West end: Kam Tin roundabout with Kam Tin Road / Tsuen Kam Road

Construction
- Inauguration: 29 September 1978 (naming date)

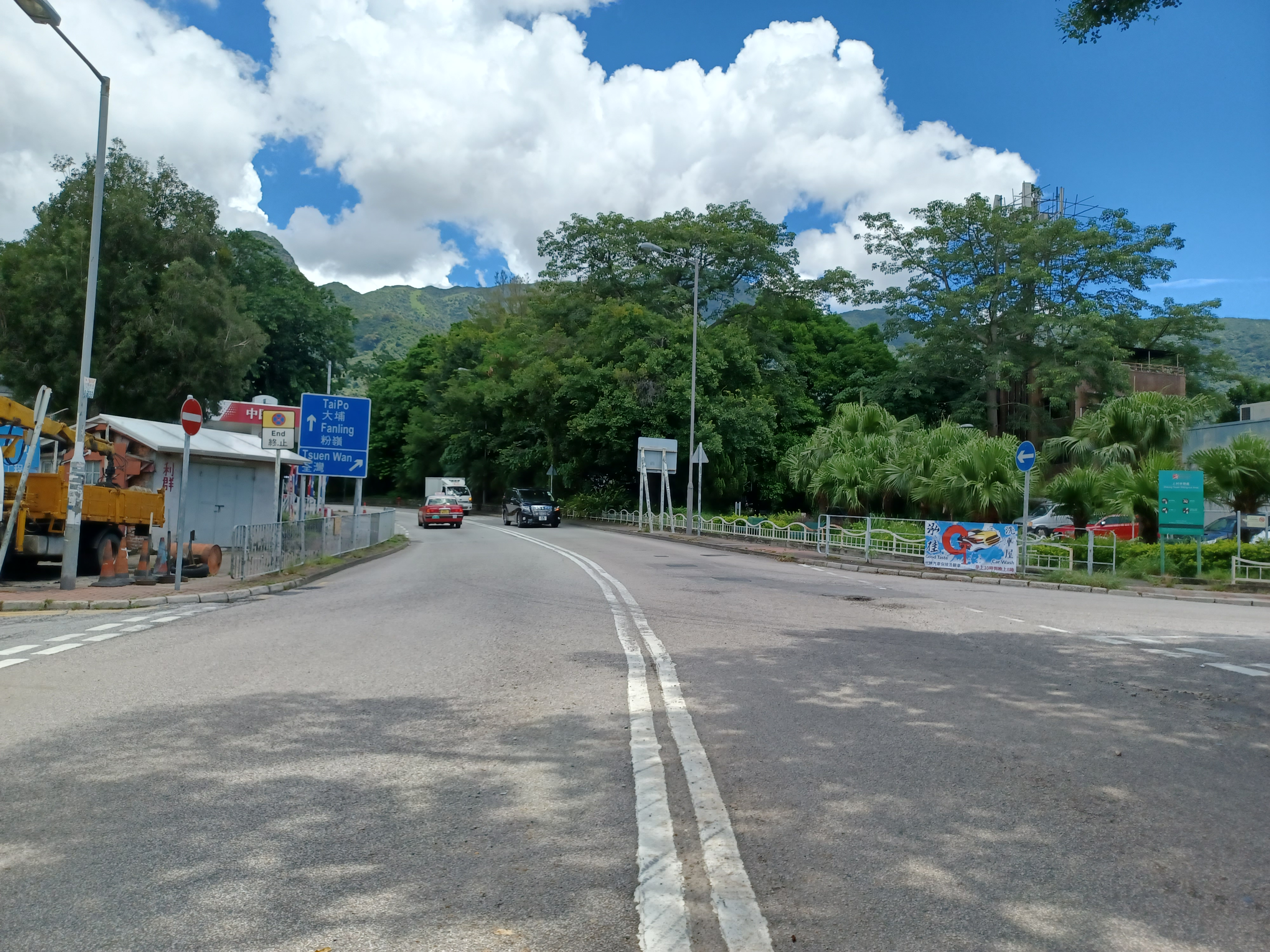
Lam Kam Road near Sheung Tsuen roundabout with Kam Tin Road and Tsuen Kam Road.

Lam Kam Road (Chinese: 林錦公路; pinyin: Línjǐn Gōnglù) is a road in Hong Kong's New Territories connecting Lam Tsuen in Tai Po District with Kam Tin in Yuen Long District. The road is 5.7 kilometres (3.5 mi) long.

Lam Kam Road starts at the Lam Kam Road interchange on Route 9 (Fanling Highway and Tolo Highway), passes through Tai To Yan, and ends at the roundabout in Sheung Tsuen connecting Kam Tin Road and Tsuen Kam Road. The entire route is an undivided two-lane road. To traverse the mountainous section between Tai To Yan and Kwun Yam Shan, the road features two steep gradients known locally as "long life slopes": a 1:8 section between Tsuen Kam Road and Kadoorie Farm and Botanic Garden, and a 1:10 section between Kadoorie Farm and Ng Tung Chai. The eastern portion through Lam Tsuen Valley is mostly flat.

Originally a major route between Yuen Long and Tai Po districts, its importance declined significantly after the completion of the New Territories Circular Road (now part of Route 9) in the 1990s. Today, traffic mainly consists of vehicles accessing nearby villages and attractions. Lam Kam Road is one of the roads accessible to New Territories taxis. Vehicles longer than 11 metres are prohibited except those with special permits.

== History ==
In the 1950s, the British Hong Kong garrison constructed Lam Kam Road, Fan Kam Road, Hou Wan Road (now part of Ping Ha Road), and Tsuen Kam Road to improve transport links in the New Territories for military purposes. Construction began on 15 July 1949, and the road opened to traffic on 28 July 1950.

Initially restricted to military and emergency vehicles, civilian vehicles without permits were prohibited and occasionally intercepted by the Royal Hong Kong Police Force. After persistent requests from local residents, the colonial government fully opened the road to the public on 9 March 1952.

Public transport did not serve the road until 1 April 1953, when the first generation of KMB Route 23 (now 64K) began operations—the only bus route to traverse the entire road to date. The western terminus was originally at Fan Kam Road until 29 September 1978, when that section was incorporated into Kam Tin Road and the current western end at Tsuen Kam Road was established.

In 1988, to support development in Kam Tin and Pat Heung, the government announced widening works for Lam Kam Road and sought over HK$60 million from the Legislative Council Finance Committee. The section from Hong Lok Yuen to Kadoorie Farm was completed in 1994, widening the carriageway from about 5.5 m to 7.3 m to current highway standards and adding a 600 m climbing lane on the steep section between Pak Ngau Shek and Kadoorie Farm.

== Route ==
Lam Kam Road runs roughly northeast–southwest between Ng Tung Chai and Lam Tsuen Valley, and east–west near Ling Wan Monastery. It is about 5.7 km long, starting at the Lam Kam Road interchange, passing through Lam Tsuen Valley and Ng Tung Chai, climbing the 1:10 long life slope to Kadoorie Farm and Botanic Garden, descending the 1:8 slope past Ling Wan Monastery, and ending at the roundabout with Tsuen Kam Road and Kam Tin Road.

=== Junctions ===
The road lies within Tai Po District and Yuen Long District, with Kadoorie Farm and Botanic Garden as the approximate boundary. Minor unnamed roads are omitted.

Distance (km)	Destination	Notes
0.0	Lam Kam Road interchange: Route 9 to Tolo Highway & Fanling Highway, Tai Wo Service Road West, Tai Po Road – Tai Wo Section	Roundabout. Route 9 A direction (clockwise) to Tolo Highway; B direction (counter-clockwise) to Fanling Highway.
0.16	Hang Ha Lei	
0.45–0.6	Lam Tsuen Rural Committee Road	
1.2	She Shan Road	
2.3	Tai Um Road	
2.7	Tai Po Shui Wo Road	
3.0	Chai Nga Road	
3.4	Ng Tung Chai Road	Roundabout
5.7	Tsuen Kam Road / Kam Tin Road	Roundabout

== Present status ==
=== Annual average daily traffic ===
The following 2021 annual average daily traffic (AADT) figures are classified as "Rural Road" by the Transport Department.

Section	AADT (vehicles/day)	Estimated
Lam Kam Road interchange to Kadoorie Farm	21,060	No
Kadoorie Farm to Kam Tin Road	20,420	Yes

=== Vehicle length restrictions ===
Since 15 December 1987, vehicles longer than 11 metres have been prohibited except with permits due to road conditions. This restriction prevents many coaches serving Kadoorie Farm from using the road without permits, leading to occasional prosecutions and industry complaints. It also prevents larger buses on KMB Route 64K, though the route is near capacity. District councillors have called for lifting the restriction. The Transport Department has indicated it will study solutions, including bus turning areas and full road condition review.

In the 2022–2023 Bus Route Planning Programme, the Transport Department announced improvement works on the Ng Tung Chai section of Lam Kam Road. Upon completion, a bus terminus will be established there to extend the Tai Po terminus of KMB Route T74 to Ng Tung Chai. In July 2023, after trial runs at the Ng Tung Chai roundabout, the department found 12 m buses feasible east of the roundabout and proposed lifting the 11 m restriction there, subject to public consultation. Effective 19 February 2025, buses of any length are permitted without permit east of the Ng Tung Chai roundabout.

=== Widening works ===
During 1990s widening, the section near Ling Wan Monastery was not upgraded like the Lam Tsuen Valley portion, as a 1997 study found the steep gradient made widening and curve improvements insufficient to meet modern safety standards, and low traffic volumes meant the existing design was adequate.

In 2007, the Highways Department planned to upgrade the Ling Wan Monastery section to modern two-lane standards under the "Kam Tin Road and remaining section of Lam Kam Road Improvement Works", starting preliminary design, land survey and impact assessment, aiming for construction in 2011. The project stalled. In 2013, Yuen Long District Council chairman Leung Che-cheung and councillor Lai Wai-hung questioned progress; the department cited high cost and low priority compared to other projects as reasons for deferral. A working group was formed in 2014 to press for widening to support Yuen Long development.

In July 2019, the Highways Department revived the proposal for the Yuen Long section—identical to the 2007 plan. Councillors urged additional lanes and curve/gradient fixes; the department said designs would consider site conditions and consult Rural Committees and the District Council before seeking funding.

== See also ==
- Route Twisk
