= Nga Yiu Ha =

Village in Ta Kwu Ling, Hong Kong

Coordinates: 22.540743°N 114.160484°E

Nga Yiu Ha (Chinese: 瓦窰下) is a village in Ta Kwu Ling, North District, Hong Kong.

== See also ==
- Heung Yuen Wai Highway
