= Ng Tung Chai =

Village in Lam Tsuen, Tai Po District, Hong Kong

Coordinates: 22.437389°N 114.127917°E

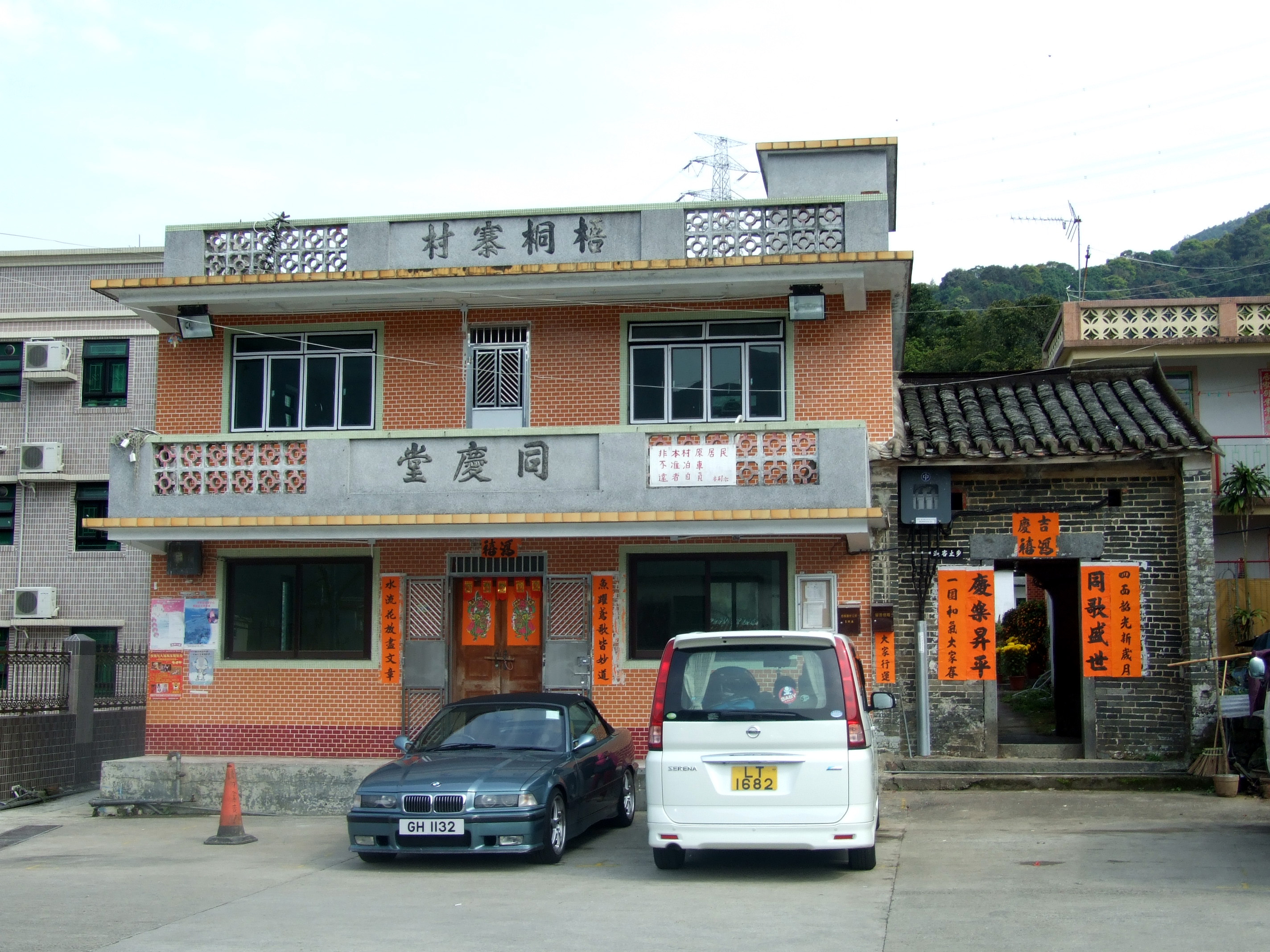
Tung Hing Tong (同慶堂) and village office (centre) and entrance gate of Ng Tung Chai (right).

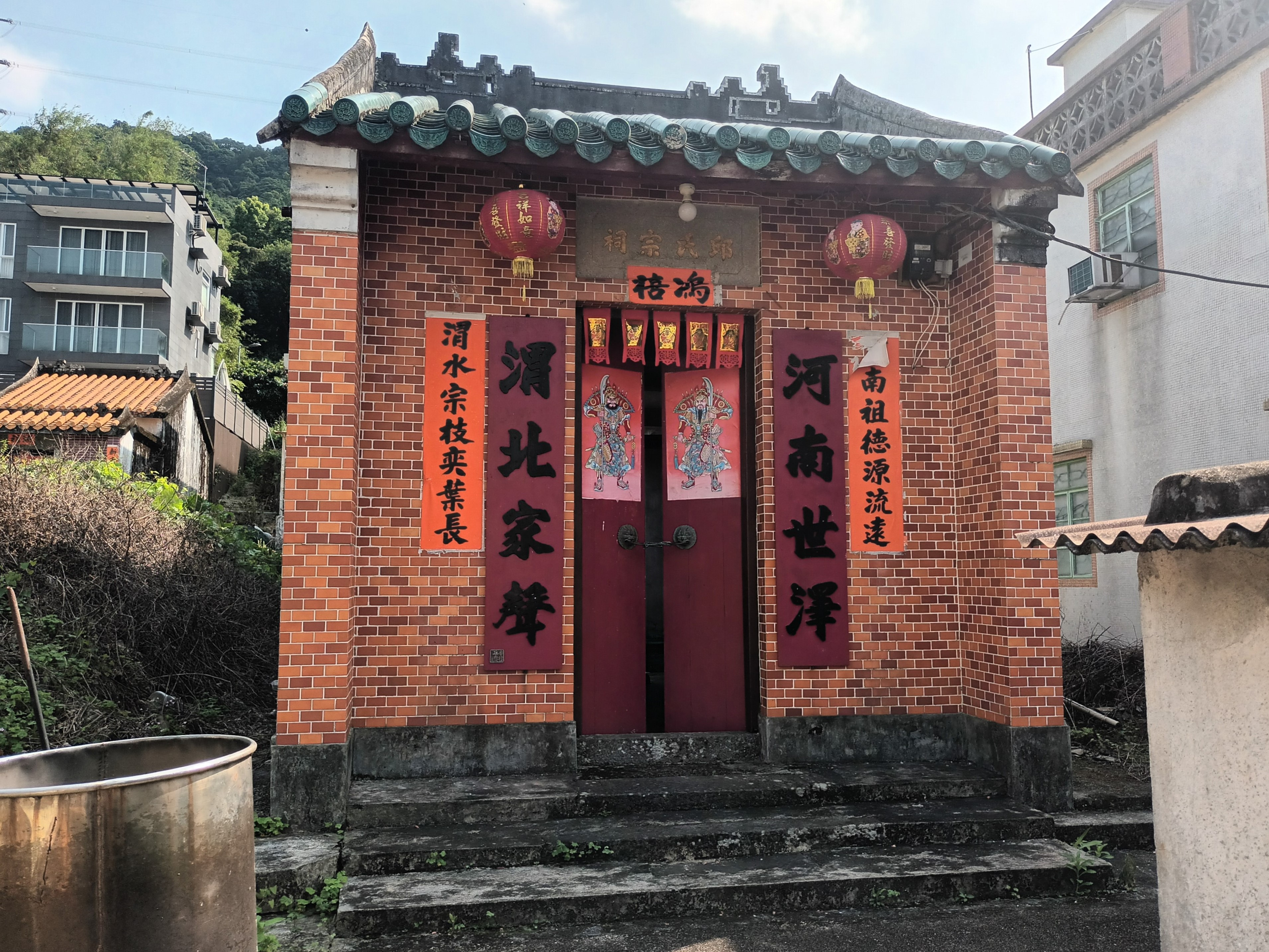
Yau Ancestral Hall (邱氏宗祠), Ng Tung Chai.

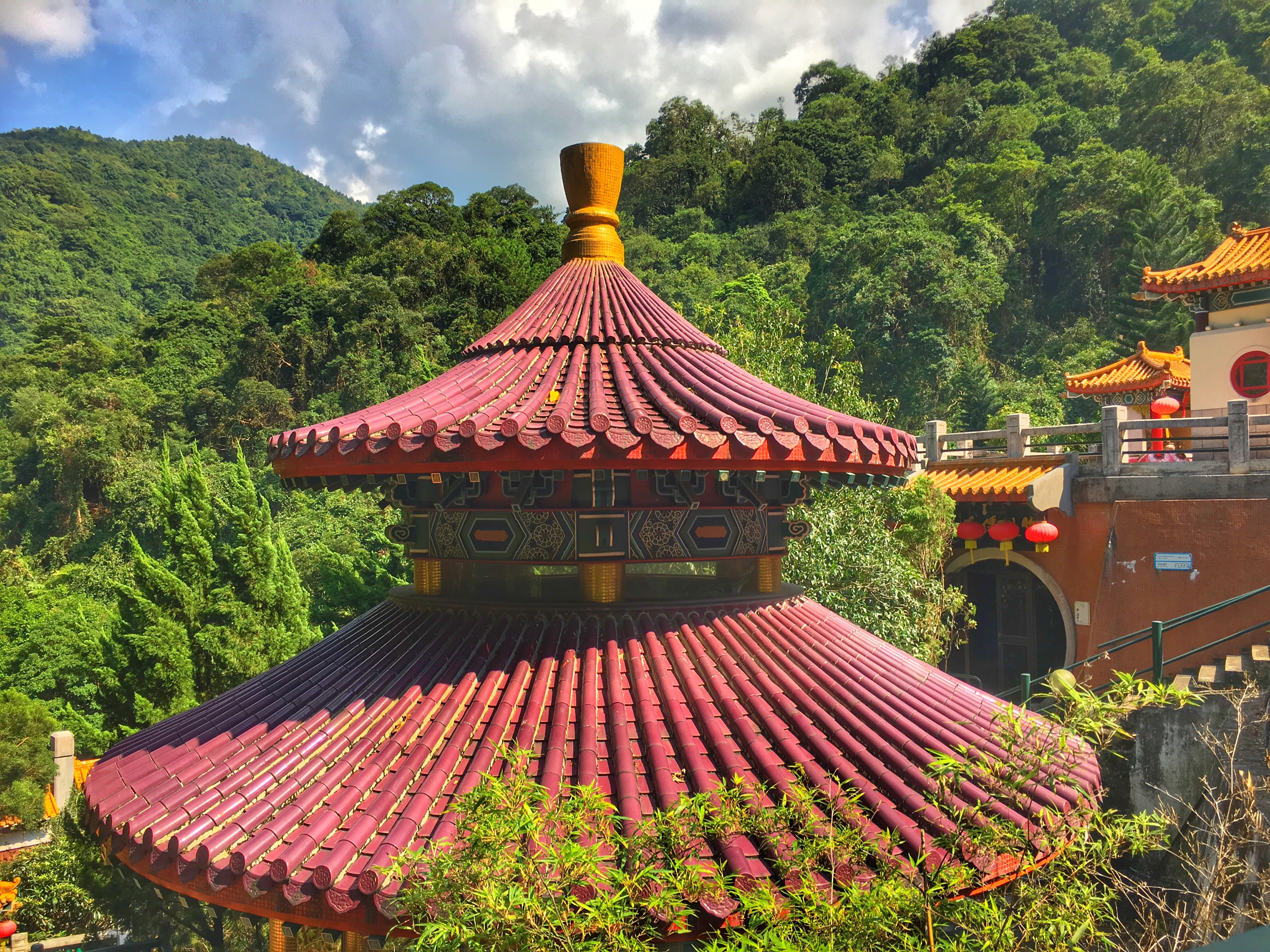
Man Tak Yuen, a Taoist temple near Ng Tung Chai.

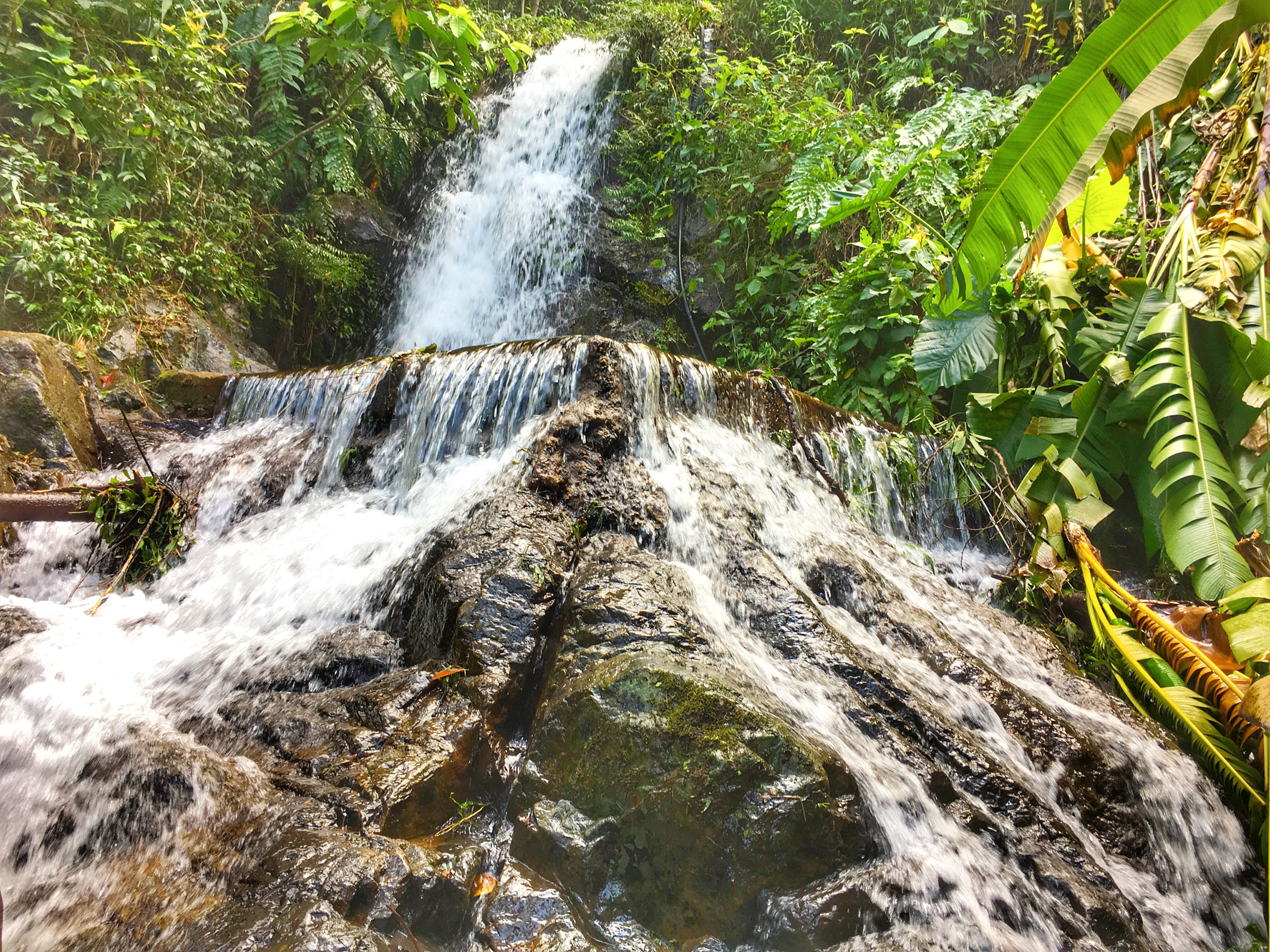
Ng Tung Waterfall

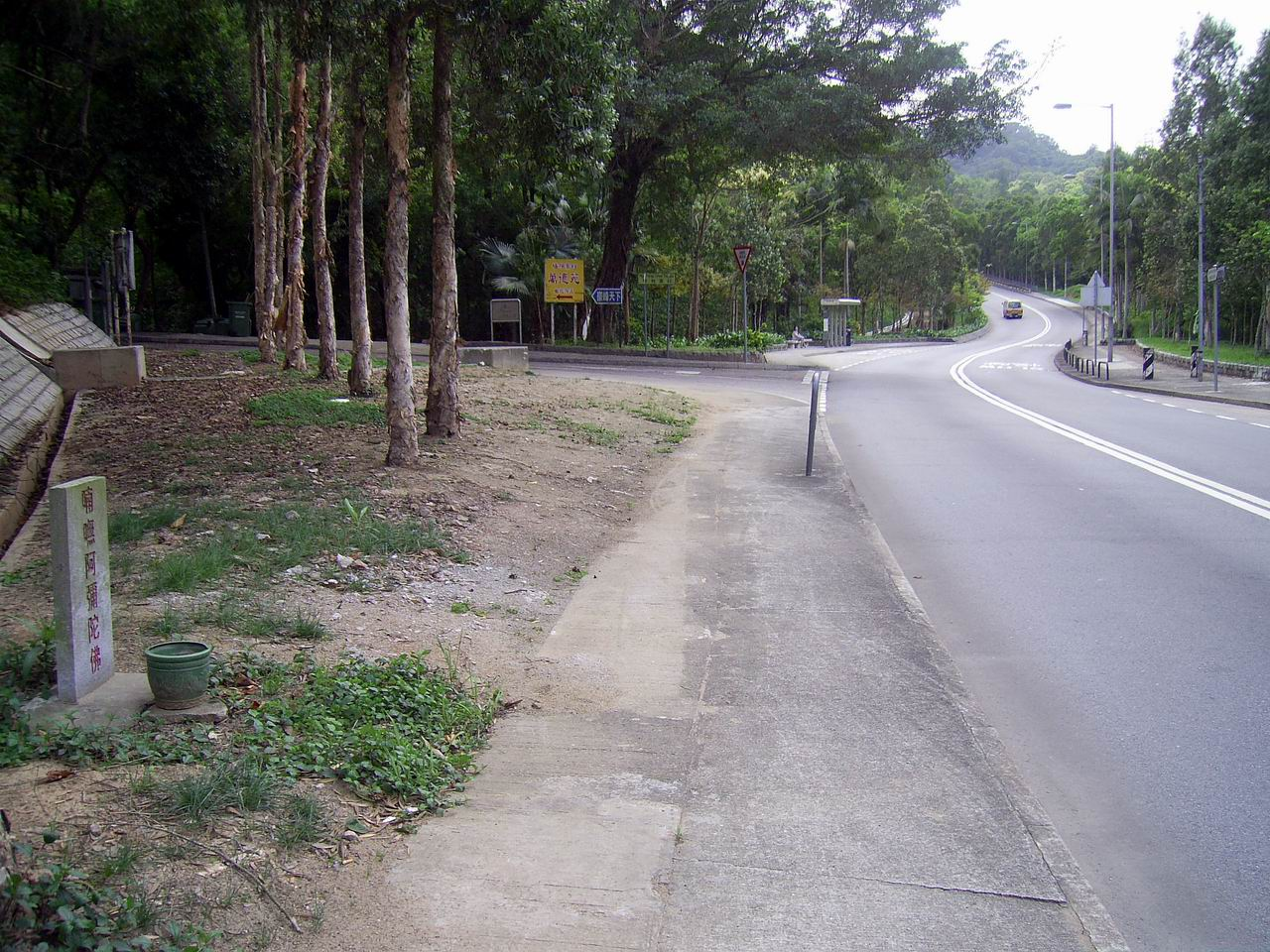
Lam Kam Road at Ng Tung Chai.

Ng Tung Chai (Chinese: 梧桐寨; lit. 'Parasol Tree Village'), also known as Wong Fung Chai (黃峰寨), is a village in Lam Tsuen, Tai Po District, Hong Kong. It is the departure point of a trail leading to a group of waterfalls, on the northern slope of Tai Mo Shan.

== Recognised status ==
Ng Tung Chai is a recognised village under the New Territories Small House Policy.

== History ==
Ng Tung Chai was established in 1739, or possibly earlier. It was historically a Hakka village, mainly inhabited by members of the Yau (邱), Sham (沈) and Koo (古) families.

At the time of the 1911 census, the population of Ng Tung Chai was 129. The number of males was 61.

== Built heritage ==
There are three ancestral halls in Ng Tung Chai, namely the Koo Ancestral Hall (古氏家祠), the Shum Ancestral Hall (沈氏家祠) and the Yau Ancestral Hall (邱氏宗祠). The Yau Ancestral Hall was built around 1800. It has been listed as a Grade III historic building.

There were also two study halls, the Shum Study Hall (沈氏家塾), now ruined, and the Tung Hing Tong (同慶堂). The Shum Study Hall, which has a history of about 100 years, provided night school for the children and adults of the village. It closed in 1950 due to the opening of the Lam Tsuen Public School. The Tung Hing Tong was built by the trust of the village and was rebuilt in 1983.

== Man Tak Yuen ==
Man Tak Yuen (萬德苑) is a Taoist temple located to the south of Ng Tung Chai village, along the path leading to the waterfalls. Man Tak Yuen was established in the mid-1970s by Man Tak Chi Sin Seh (萬德至善社). Man Tak Chi Sin Seh had been founded in 1951 in Kowloon, worshipping Lu Tsu (呂祖). Lu Tsu Hall (呂祖殿) of Man Tak Yuen was completed in 1977. Jik Dak Pavilion (積德亭; 'Good Deeds Pavilion'), built in 1981, is intended to be used to pray for rain. Several additional halls were built during the 1990s.

== Waterfalls ==
Ng Tung Chai Waterfalls form a group of four waterfalls, located south of Ng Tung Chai Village and within Tai Mo Shan Country Park. They are, in ascending order, Bottom Fall (aka. Well Falls), Middle Fall (aka. Horse-tail Falls), Main Fall (aka. Long Fall) and Scatter Fall. Main Fall features a drop of 35 metres and is considered the highest waterfall in Hong Kong.

== Flora ==
The Ng Tung Chai ravine on the north-west of Tai Mo Shan, covering an area of 226 hectares, is floristically one of the richest places in Hong Kong. Species found there include dysoxylum hongkongense, dendrobenthamia hongkongensis, machilus, asplenium nidus, cyathea spinulosa and paris chinensis. The area was designated as a Site of Special Scientific Interest in 1979.

Aquilaria sinensis, sometimes referred to as 'Incense Tree', can also be found in Ng Tung Chai. The tree is said to usually occur in Hong Kong in natural woodland on lower hill slopes and in fung shui woods behind villages.

== Access ==
Ng Tung Chai is served by KMB Route 64K and green minibus Route 25K. Both routes have stops at Ng Tung Chai, along Lam Kam Road.
