= Fan Kam Road =

Road in Hong Kong's New Territories

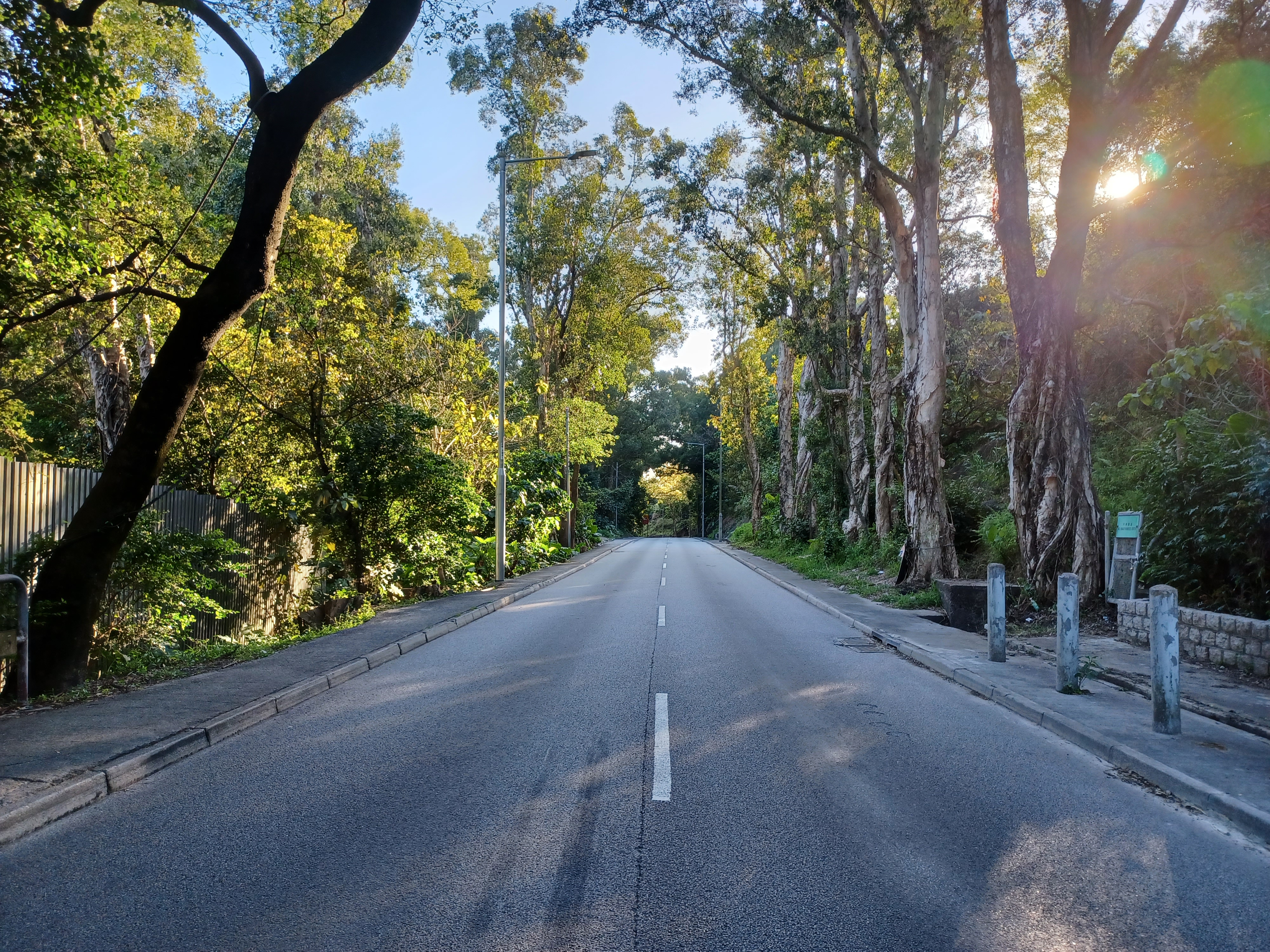
- Former name: Fan Kam Road (粉錦路)
- Length: 7.8 km (4.8 mi)
- Restrictions: 50 km/h (speed limit)
- Location: Yuen Long District, North District, Hong Kong
- East end: Junction with Po Shek Wu Road / Fanling Highway in Sheung Shui; 22.4999°N 114.1236°E
- West end: Junction with Kam Tin Road beside Pat Heung Police Station in Pat Heung; 22.4413°N 114.0888°E

Construction
- Inauguration: 24 August 1979 (naming date - Hong Kong Government Gazette)

Fan Kam Road (Chinese: 粉錦公路; pinyin: Fěnjǐn Gōnglù), formerly known as Fan Kam Road (粉錦路), is a road connecting Sheung Shui in North District with Pat Heung in Yuen Long District, in the New Territories of Hong Kong. It is 7.8 kilometres long. Its eastern terminus is at the junction of Po Shek Wu Road and Fanling Highway in Sheung Shui, and its western terminus is beside Pat Heung Police Station in Pat Heung, at its junction with Kam Tin Road.

The road was built by the Hong Kong Government in the early 1950s, together with Route Twisk and Lam Kam Road, to form a road network connecting the eastern and northern parts of the New Territories.

== History ==
Following the early opening of Lam Kam Road in April 1953 for the convenience of residents, Fan Kam Road opened to traffic in July of the same year, connecting Sheung Shui with Kam Tin and Pat Heung; at the time it was named Fan Kam Road (粉錦路). When the road first opened, residents living along it who wished to drive on it had to apply to the government for a permit, at a cost of one dollar per application. As a result, traffic on the road was initially sparse, with only vehicles of the British Hong Kong garrison and the police passing through. In September 1953, residents of the villages along Fan Kam Road wrote to Kowloon Motor Bus requesting that the company provide them with bus services. In November 1955, the then KMB Route 18 (now KMB Route 77K) was rerouted via Fan Kam Road, and remains to this day the only bus route to travel along the road. On 24 August 1979, the road was renamed Fan Kam Road (粉錦公路).

The section of Fan Kam Road opposite the Pat Heung Siu Shun Centre

== Junctions ==
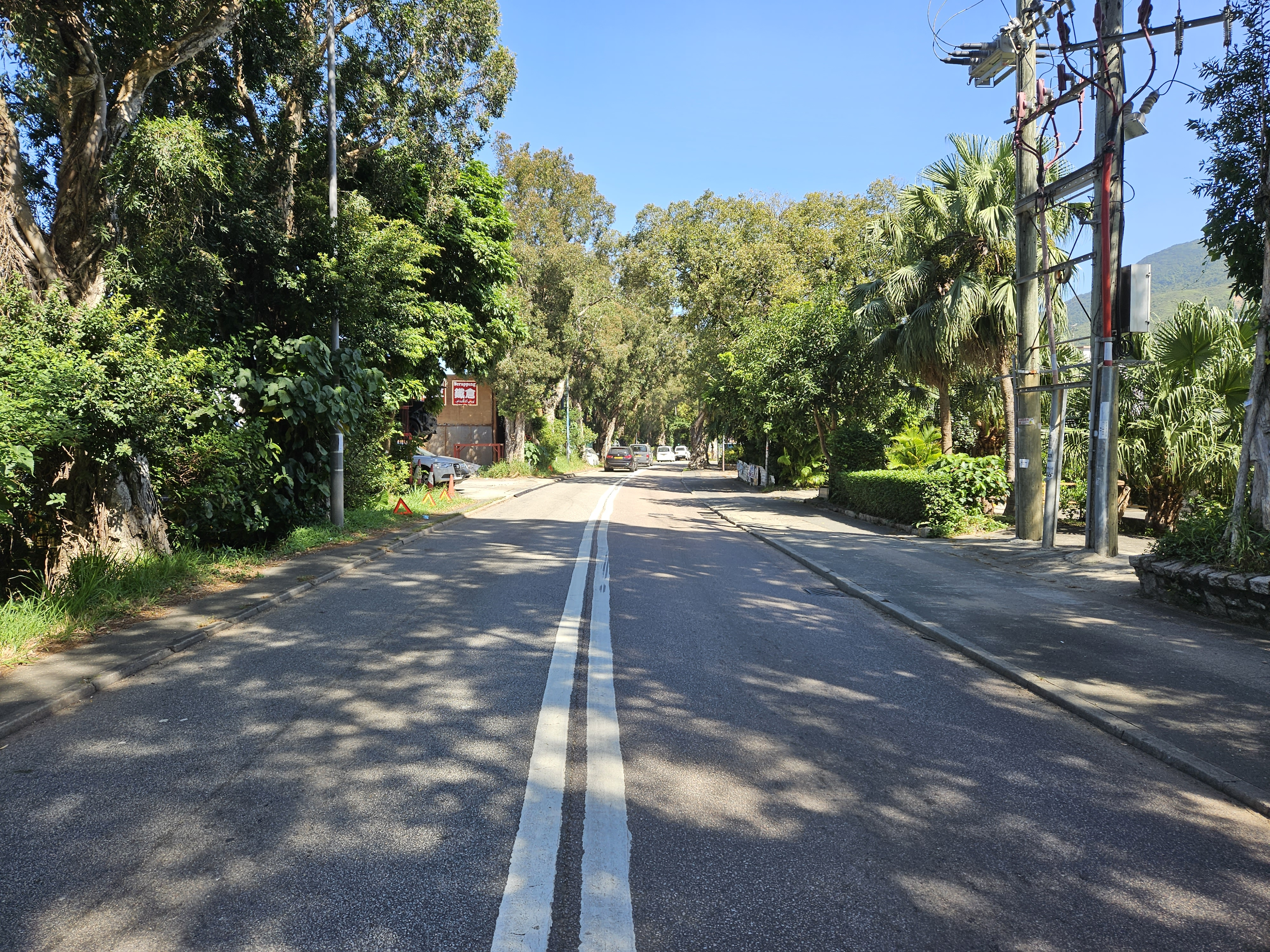
Fan Kam Road – Wang Toi Shan section

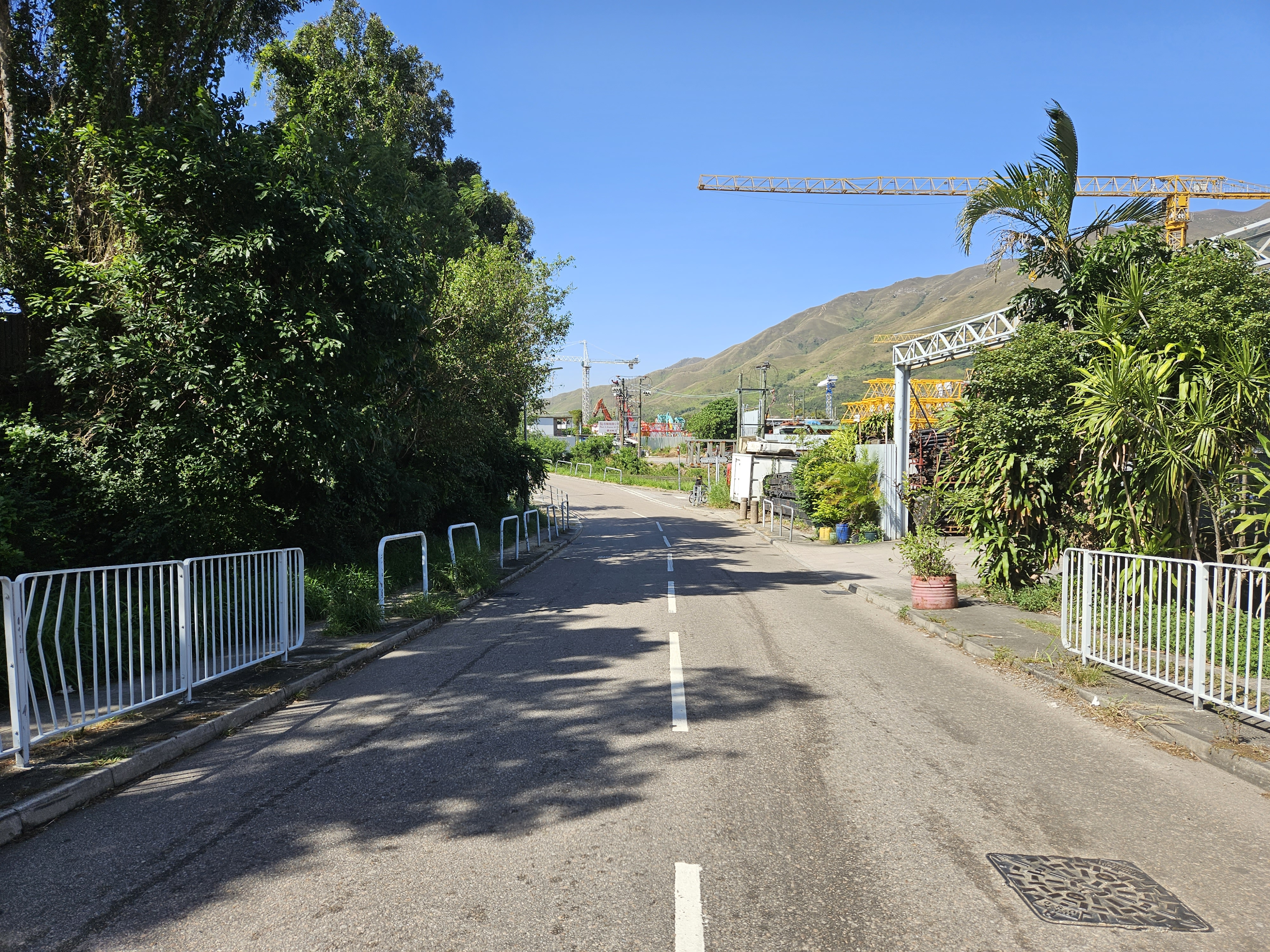
Wang Toi Shan Shan Tsuen Road

- Kam Tin Road
- Wang Toi Shan Shan Tsuen Road
- Tsiu Keng Road
- Po Kin Road
- Castle Peak Road – Kwu Tung Section
- Fanling Highway
- Po Shek Wu Road
