= Heung Yuen Wai Control Point =

Immigration control point on the Hong Kong-Shenzhen Border

Heung Yuen Wai Control Point Liantang Port
- 香園圍管制站 莲塘口岸
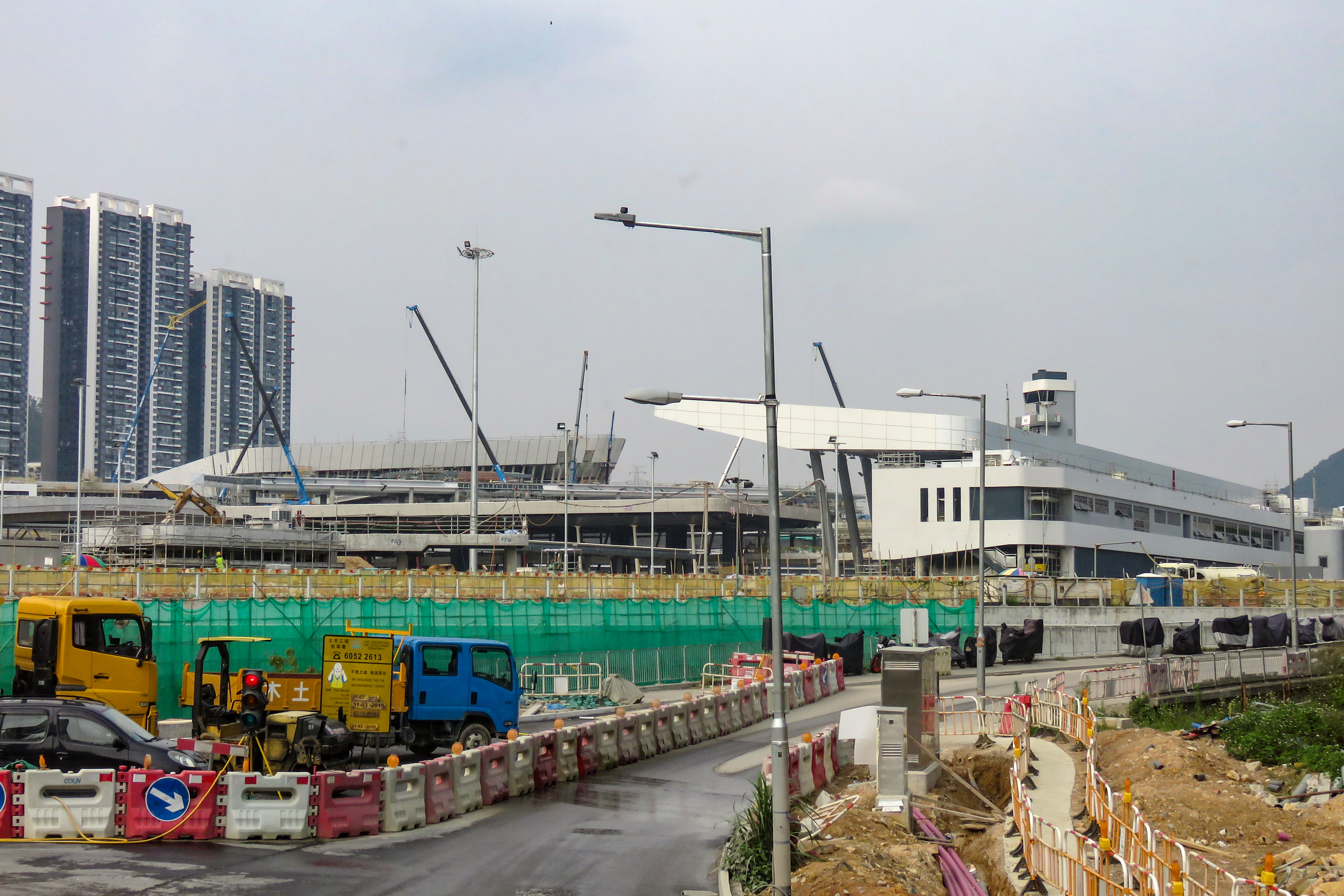
- Heung Yuen Wai Control Point under construction in March 2019, view from Hong Kong towards Shenzhen
- Interactive map of the Heung Yuen Wai Control Point; Liantang Port area

General information
- Type: Border control
- Location: Heung Yuen Wai, New Territories, Hong Kong
- Coordinates: 22°33′15.43″N 114°9′8.72″E
- Opened: 26 August 2020 (cargo); 6 February 2023 (passenger)
- Operator: Customs and Excise Department, Immigration Department

Website
- td.gov.hk (Hong Kong)
- Coordinates: 22°33′15″N 114°09′09″E
- Crosses: Frontier Closed Area

Statistics
- Toll: No toll

Location
- Interactive map of Heung Yuen Wai Control Point

Heung Yuen Wai Control Point
- Traditional Chinese: 香園圍管制站
- Simplified Chinese: 香园围管制站
- Hanyu Pinyin: Xiāngyuánwéi guǎnzhìzhàn
- Jyutping: hoeng1 jyun4 wai4 gun2 zai3 zaam6
Transcriptions
Standard Mandarin
- Hanyu Pinyin: Xiāngyuánwéi guǎnzhìzhàn
- Wade–Giles: Hsiang-yüan-wei Kuan-chih-chan
Yue: Cantonese
- Yale Romanization: hēung yùhn wàih gún jai jaahm
- Jyutping: hoeng1 jyun4 wai4 gun2 zai3 zaam6

Liantang Port
- Traditional Chinese: 蓮塘口岸
- Simplified Chinese: 莲塘口岸
- Hanyu Pinyin: Liántáng kǒuàn
- Jyutping: lin4 tong4 hau2 ngon6
Transcriptions
Standard Mandarin
- Hanyu Pinyin: Liántáng kǒuàn
- Wade–Giles: Lien-tʻang Kʻou-an
Yue: Cantonese
- Jyutping: lin4 tong4 hau2 ngon6

Heung Yuen Wai Control Point (Chinese: 香園圍管制站) is a land border control point at the border at Heung Yuen Wai in North District, New Territories, Hong Kong. Its counterpart across the border is Liantang Port (Chinese: 莲塘口岸) in Shenzhen, Guangdong. The control point opened for freight trucks on 26 August 2020 and to passengers since 6 February 2023.

== History ==
According to the government, the border control point was needed to relieve the heavily used border control points (like Lo Wu Control Point) to the west. The control point was chosen to be built between Lo Wu Control Point and Sha Tau Kok Control Point.

== Opening ==
Its opening was reported in at least one outlet in May 2019 as scheduled for September 2019. Other reports claimed it would open by the end of 2019.

The opening of the control point was further delayed due to the COVID-19 pandemic, as Hong Kong shut down all border crossings with Shenzhen except the Shenzhen Bay Control Point to control the spread of the virus.

On 21 August 2020, it was announced that the Control Point would be opened on 26 August 2020, albeit for cross-boundary trucks only.

On 6 February 2023, with the lifting of COVID-19 control measures in China, the control point opened to passenger traffic.

== Transport ==
A new dual-carriageway access highway, Heung Yuen Wai Highway, was built to link the control point from Fanling Highway, connecting with the Eastern Corridor roadway on the mainland side. The highway comprises viaducts and two tunnels (Cheung Shan Tunnel and Lung Shan Tunnel); the main viaduct was completed on 14 March 2018. The road was expected to open by the end of 2018, but its opening was delayed until 26 May 2019. 3 new bus routes were set up by Citybus and KMB when the control point became open to passengers in 2023, connecting the control point with Sheung Shui, Shatin via Tai Po, and Tuen Mun via Yuen Long respectively. At the bus terminus outside, there is also an existing KMB bus route to Sheung Shui via Ta Kwu Ling and Ping Che, as well as a minibus route.

The Control Point is also the first border crossing between Hong Kong and Shenzhen that is accessible to both pedestrians and bicycles.

Liantang Control Point in Shenzhen became further accessible from October 2020 onwards via an extension of Shenzhen Metro Line 2. It is located very near Liantang Checkpoint station's exit A3.
