= Kau Lung Hang =

Village in Hong Kong

Coordinates: 22.480088°N 114.158986°E

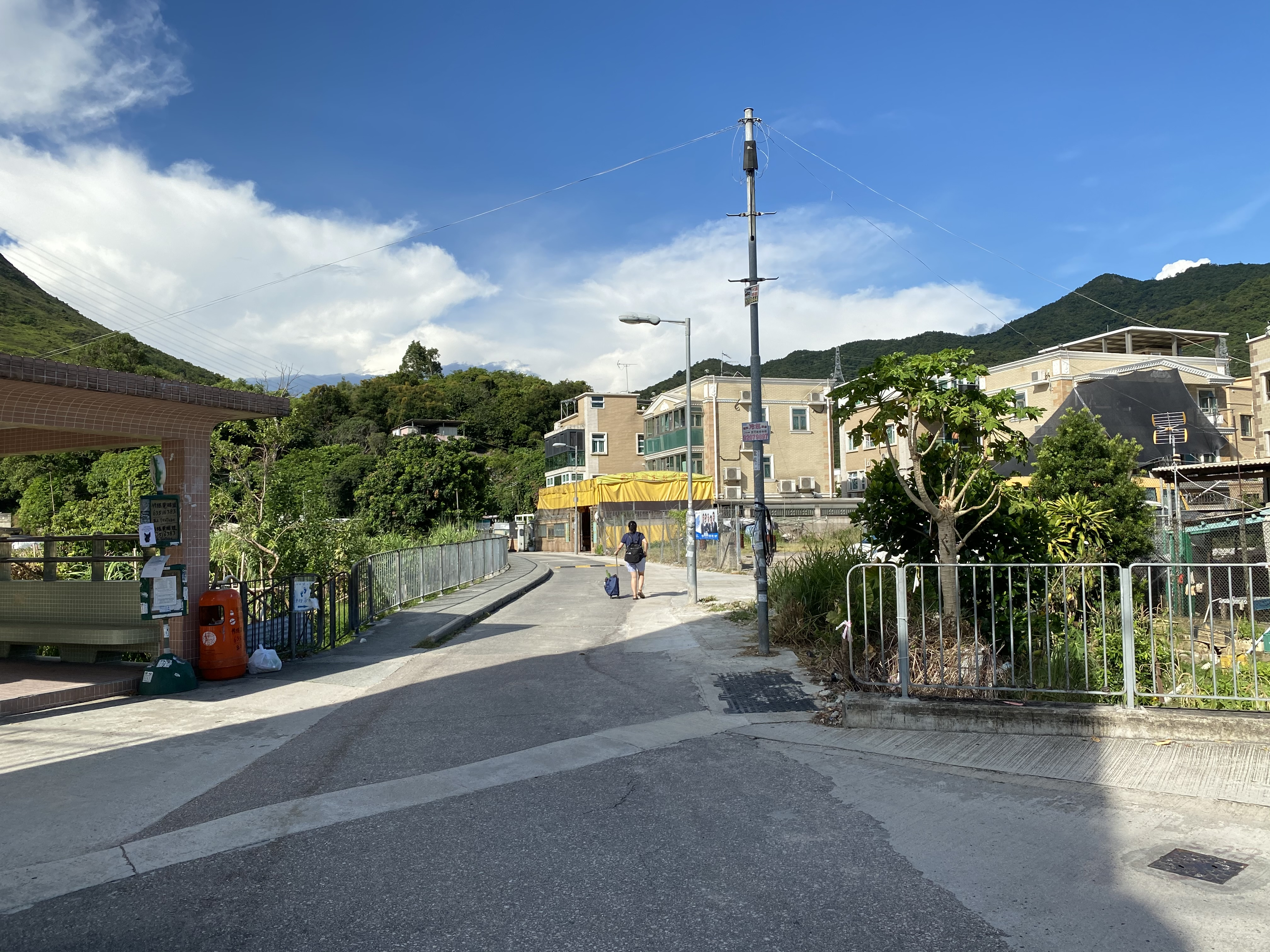
Kau Lung Hang

Kau Lung Hang (Chinese: 九龍坑) is a village in Tai Po District, Hong Kong.

== Administration ==
Kau Lung Hang is a recognized village under the New Territories Small House Policy. It is one of the villages represented within the Tai Po Rural Committee. For electoral purposes, Kau Lung Hang is part of the Hong Lok Yuen constituency, which was formerly represented by Zero Yiu Yeuk-sang until May 2021.

== Education ==
Kau Lung Hang is in Primary One Admission (POA) School Net 84. Within the school net are multiple aided schools (operated independently but funded with government money) and Tai Po Government Primary School (大埔官立小學).
