= Lin Ma Hang Road =

Road in Hong Kong

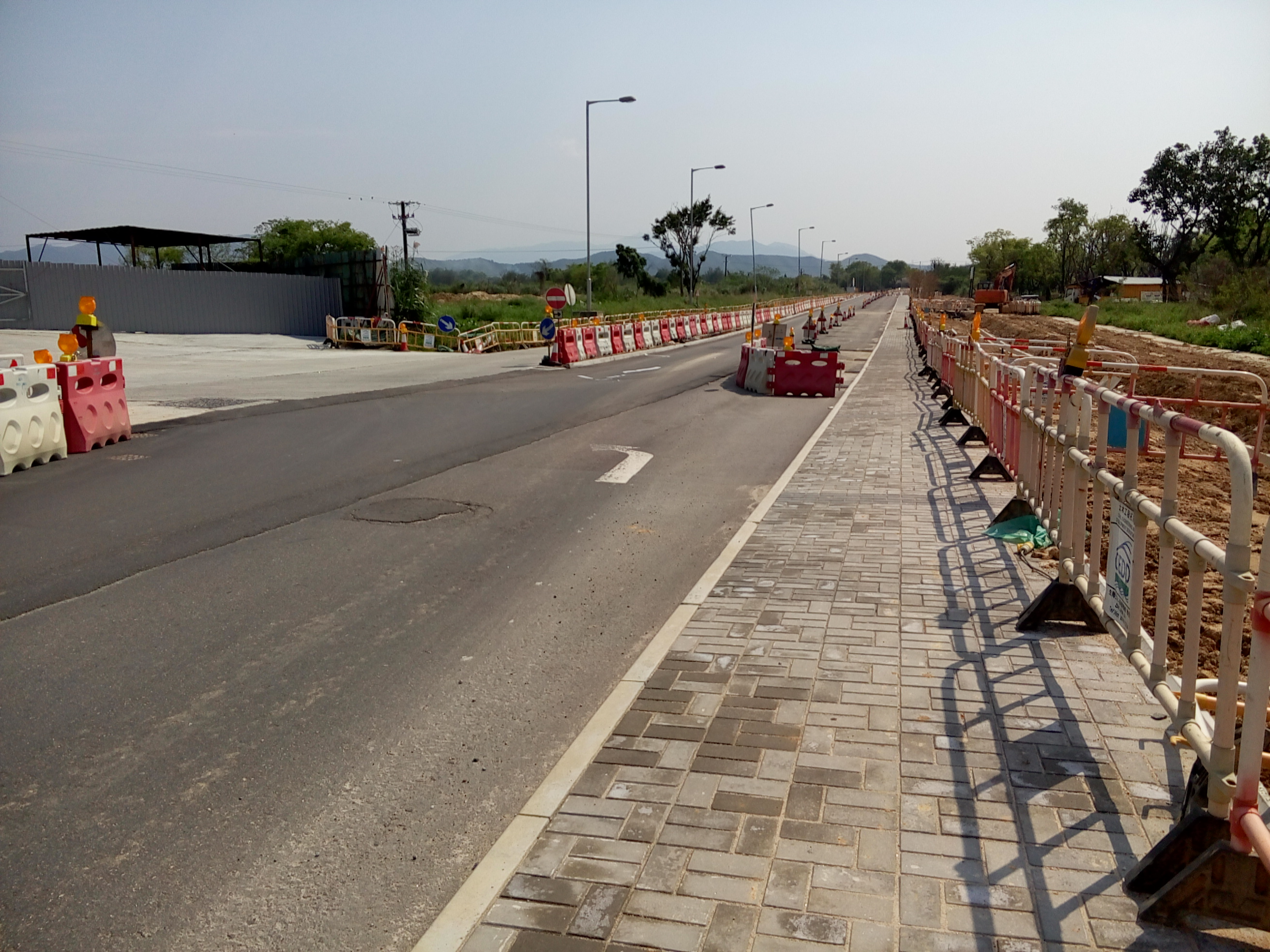
Lin Ma Hang Road near Ta Kwu Ling

Lin Ma Hang Road (Chinese: 蓮麻坑路) is one of the northernmost roads in Hong Kong. Most of the road was built along the border with mainland China along the Sham Chun River.

The road spans from Man Kam To to Sha Tau Kok. The entire length of the road fell within the Frontier Closed Area until 4 January 2016. Currently, about 6.2 kilometres (3.9 mi) of the 13.2 kilometres (8.2 mi) long road near Lin Ma Hang and Sha Tau Kok is inaccessible. The project for widening the road was completed in November 2023.

Part of Lia Ma Hang Road in Hongkong.

== See also ==
- Border Road
