= Tsuen Wan footbridge network =

Footbridge network in Hong Kong

The Tsuen Wan pedestrian bridge network (traditional Chinese: 荃灣行人天橋網絡; simplified Chinese: 荃湾行人天桥网络) is located in the New Territories of Hong Kong and is the longest continuous pedestrian bridge network system in Hong Kong. After Tsuen Wan was gazetted as a satellite town in 1961, the first proposal to build footbridges in Tsuen Wan appeared in a special report in the Overseas Chinese Daily News on 29 October 1962, which discussed the need to build footbridges in satellite towns. The first footbridge in Tsuen Wan was completed in 1979. In the early stages of development, Tsuen Wan's pedestrian bridge network was divided into a northern section centred on Tsuen Wan MTR Station and a southern section centred on Tsuen Wan Pier (later known as KCR Tsuen Wan West Station). It wasn't until 2013, as part of the Tsuen Wan pedestrian bridge network extension project, that Footbridge A, built along Tai Ho Road, was completed, linking the northern and southern sections of the network.

The Tsuen Wan pedestrian bridge network consists of several pedestrian bridges built by various government agencies and developers, as well as overhead walkways connecting shopping malls, residential buildings and public buildings. It is centred around Tsuen Wan station and Tsuen Wan West station and stretches from Panda Hotel in the east to Discovery Park in the west and down to Indi Home in the south. It directly connects more than 20 shopping malls with various locations in Tsuen Wan, allowing residents to reach their destinations without going down to the ground and providing access to most public transport services. Tsuen Wan is also nicknamed "Sky City", "K.L. City" and "Streetless City" due to its extensive pedestrian bridge network. Tsuen Wan's pedestrian bridge network attracts a large volume of pedestrian traffic, as well as street vendors and others. Many of the footbridges in Tsuen Wan are built and managed by developers, resulting in different management for each footbridge.

== History ==
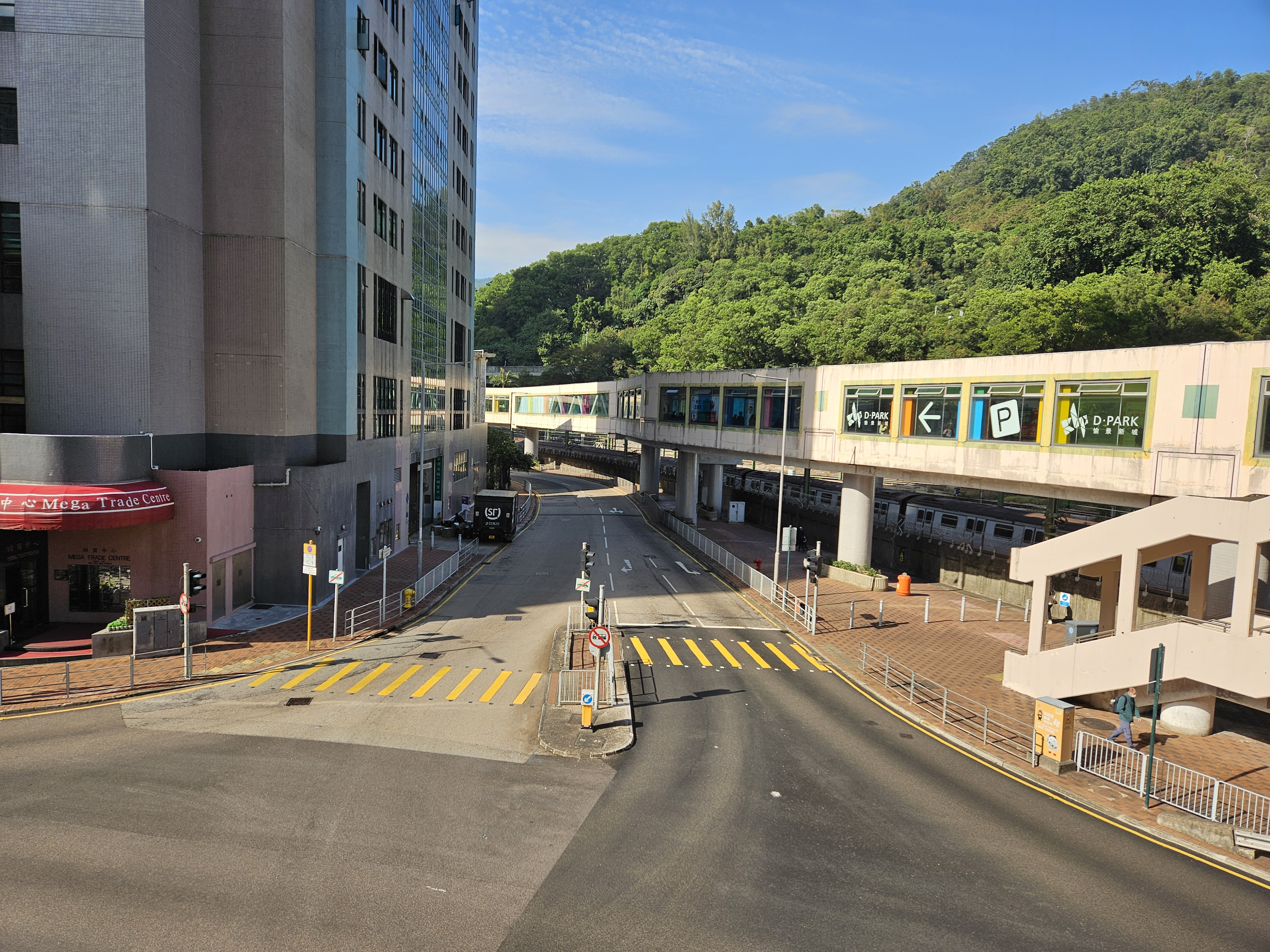
On the right is the Discovery Park footbridge, which, because of its rare scale, has become the prototype for pedestrian bridges linking large shopping malls in various districts of Hong Kong.

After the development of Tsuen Wan as a satellite town was gazetted by the British Hong Kong government in 1961, the Overseas Chinese Daily News published a special report on 29 October the following year discussing the need for pedestrian bridges in satellite towns, including Tsuen Wan, in an attempt to raise public awareness of the construction of pedestrian bridges on arterial roads. The pedestrian bridge at the junction of Castle Peak Road - Tsuen Wan section and Tai Chung Road, which crosses the traffic lanes, was completed in 1979 as the first pedestrian bridge in Tsuen Wan, providing a passage for villagers migrating from the coastal area of the Northern Mountain to travel between the China Dyeing Factory and the southern Fuk Loi Estate and market. As the MTR Tsuen Wan line followed a route along the northern foothills of Tai Mo Shan, the underground railway project, which began in the 1980s, disrupted the villagers' routes up and down the mountain. As a result, two pedestrian bridges were built over the railway tracks to connect to the Fu Yung Shan area.

With the opening of the Tsuen Wan Line in 1982, Tsuen Wan Station and the nearby pedestrian bridge network, including the footbridge over Sai Lau Kok Road and Castle Peak Road, also opened, marking the beginning of the development of the northern section. The Tsuen Wan Transport Complex, completed the following year, adopted a platform design and was connected by several pedestrian bridges, initiating the development of the southern section. The Tsuen Kam Centre, which opened in 1986, was a continuation of the pedestrian bridge network linked to the Nan Fung Centre, which was completed almost simultaneously with Tsuen Wan Station. The four private residential complexes (Tsuen Fung Centre, Waldorf Centre, Tsuen Cheong Centre and Ho Fai Commercial Centre) opened their base shopping malls in 1987 and were linked by pedestrian bridges to create a chain effect. Citistore opened in 1989, also connected to the northern section network by a pedestrian bridge outside Tsuen Fung Centre. Later, in 1988, the government filled in the Tai Chung Road culvert and built a new Tai Chung Road with a total of eight lanes and three pedestrian bridges crossing it. In 1991, the northern section of the network was extended to Kwan Mun Hau Street.

With the completion of Discovery Park in 1998, a 600-meter-long pedestrian bridge connecting Tsuen Wan Station and Discovery Park (Discovery Park Footbridge) was also opened, becoming the precursor to large shopping malls connected by pedestrian bridges in various districts of Hong Kong due to its rare scale. The pedestrian bridge across Sha Tsui Road leading to the Tsuen Wan Government Office was completed in 2001, branching from the Discovery Park Footbridge. The KCR Tsuen Wan West Station was opened in 2003, initially connecting to the pedestrian bridge network via a composite building; however, this link was temporarily severed in 2013 due to the demolition of the composite building and the development of residential projects. In 2007, the Hong Kong government announced the expansion of the Tsuen Wan pedestrian bridge network and began construction of "Pedestrian Bridge A along Tai Ho Road," which was originally scheduled for completion in 2011 but was ultimately completed and opened in 2013, connecting the northern and southern segments of the network. Additionally, "Pedestrian Bridge D connecting Tsuen Wan Plaza, Bay View Plaza, and adjacent landscaped areas," which began construction in 2015, was also completed in 2019.

In 2019, the Highways Department initiated consultancy contracts for "Pedestrian Bridge C along Kwan Mun Hau Street and Luen Yan Street" and "Pedestrian Bridge E along Ma Tau Pa Road and Wing Shun Street." Phase II of Nina Mall and five nearby pedestrian bridges were also completed and opened that same year, allowing Tsuen Wan West Station to reconnect to the pedestrian bridge network. With the completion of The Aurora and its shopping mall Plaza 88 in 2020, both projects included pedestrian bridges connecting Tsuen Shing Street and other existing bridges, further expanding the pedestrian bridge network to include areas like Chelsea Court, H Cube, Indi Home, and Texaco Road Industrial Area. On July 15, 2021, the government announced the connection of "Pedestrian Bridge B along Tai Chung Road and Hoi Shing Road," which connects with three existing pedestrian bridges crossing Tai Chung Road. Tsuen Wan residents can now utilize the pedestrian bridge network to access various locations in Tsuen Wan town center and connect to most public transport services.

== Overview ==
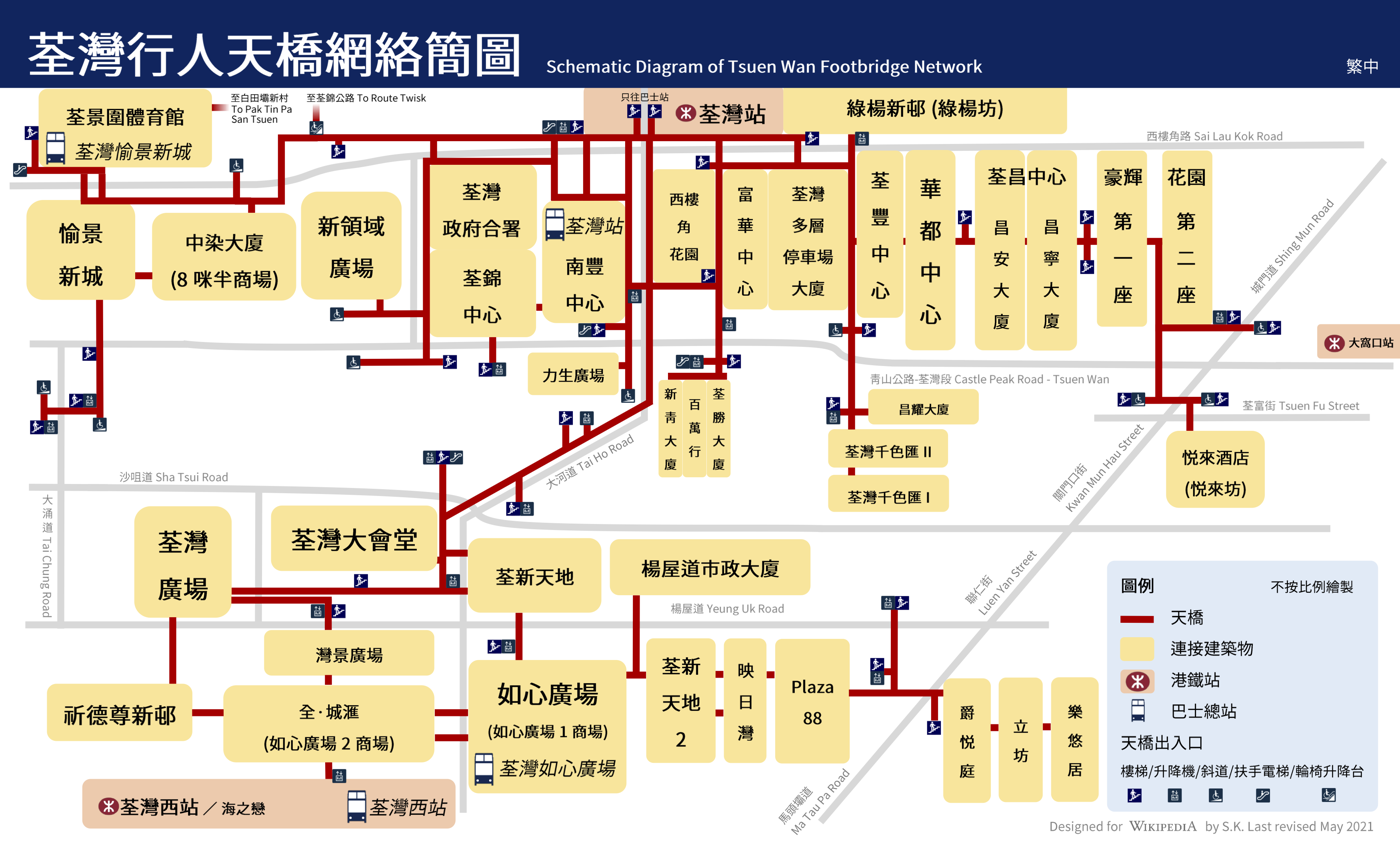
Tsuen Wan Pedestrian Footbridge Network diagram.

The Tsuen Wan Pedestrian Footbridge Network is Hong Kong's longest covered, seamless pedestrian footbridge network. It is composed of a series of pedestrian footbridges constructed by multiple government and developer groups, connecting shopping malls, residential buildings, and public structures through elevated pathways. The network is centered around Tsuen Wan Station and Tsuen Wan West Station, extending from Indi Home in the east to Discovery Park in the west, and to Chelsea Court in the south. Due to its vast size and extensive coverage, directly linking more than 20 shopping malls and various parts of Tsuen Wan's city center, residents of Tsuen Wan can reach their destinations without ever needing to walk on the ground. This has earned Tsuen Wan the nicknames "Sky City," "Off-the-Ground City," and "City Without Streets."

=== Northern Section ===
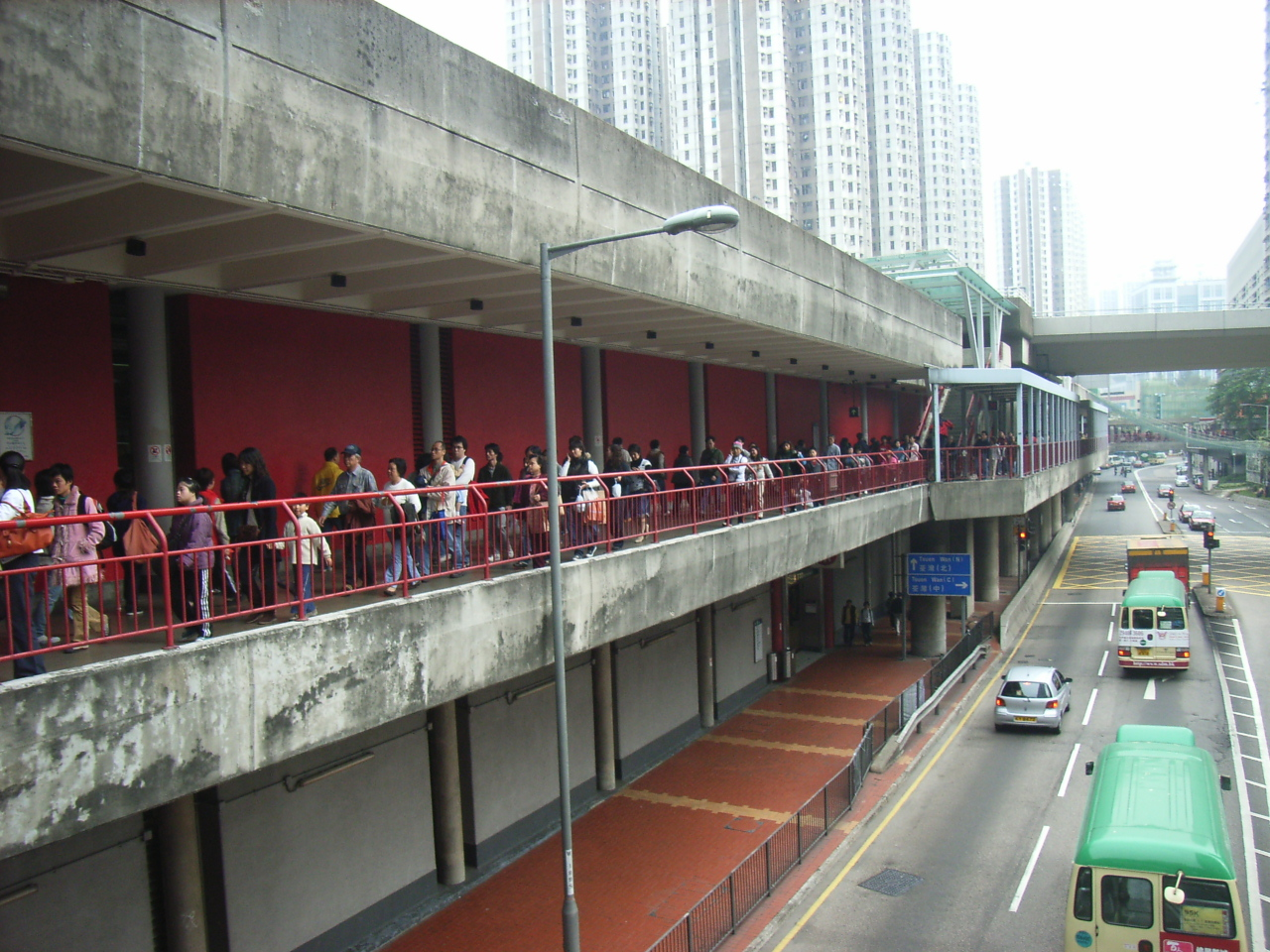
Pedestrian bridges outside Tsuen Wan Station connect Nan Fung Centre and Luk Yeung Galleria.

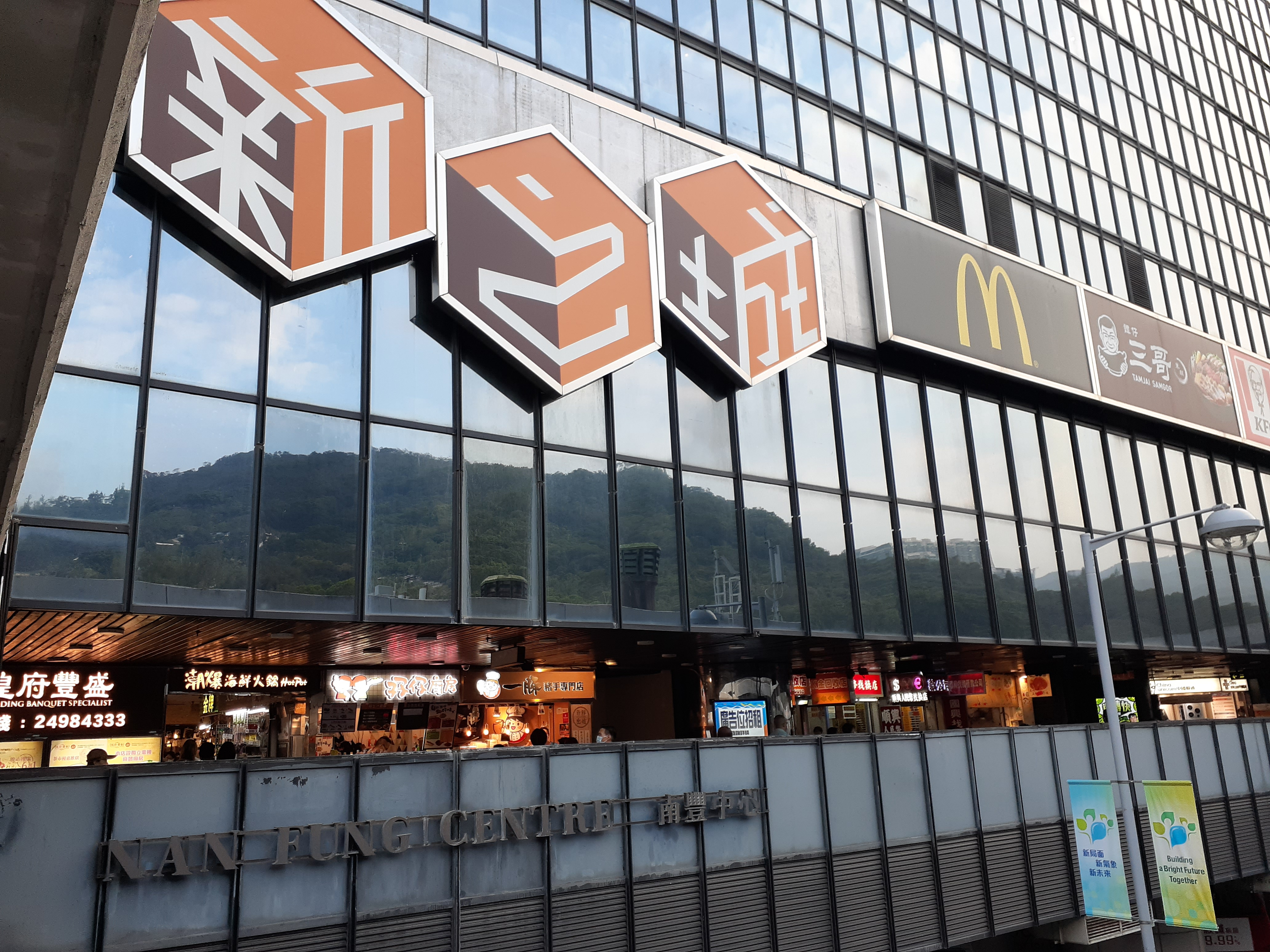
A semi-outdoor elevated passage at Nan Fung Centre.

The first pedestrian bridge in Tsuen Wan was built at the intersection of Castle Peak Road - Tsuen Wan Section and Tai Chung Road. This bridge spanned the traffic lanes of Castle Peak Road - Tsuen Wan Section and was completed in 1979. It provided a passage for villagers who had relocated from the coastal area to the hills in the north, connecting them to the China Dyeing Factory and southern Fuk Loi Estate and markets. When the MTR Tsuen Wan Line was constructed through the northern side of Castle Peak Road at the foot of Tai Mo Shan in the 1980s, the railway project cut off the villagers' access to the mountains, necessitating the construction of two pedestrian bridges over the tracks to connect the Fu Yung Shan area. These two pedestrian bridges now link Tsuen King Circuit Sports Centre and Pak Tin Pa Village, as well as the Discovery Park footbridge and Route Twisk.

With the opening of the Tsuen Wan Line in 1982, the pedestrian bridge network near Tsuen Wan Station, including bridges across Sai Lau Kok Road and Castle Peak Road, was also inaugurated, marking the start of the northern section of the network. Almost completed at the same time, Nan Fung Centre became part of this network. As a ground-level station, Tsuen Wan Station serves as a transfer hub for commuters from Tuen Mun, Yuen Long, and the suburbs of Tsuen Wan. The station's concourse is located on the first floor and is connected by footbridges. The west exit leads to Lik Sang Plaza via Nan Fung Centre. However, the footbridge outside Lik Sang Plaza, managed by the mall's owners' committee, was found to be at risk of collapse due to neglect in 2018-2019. The east exit connects to Luk Yeung Galleria, the Fou Wah Centre, and the Tsuen Wan Multi-Storey Car Park, leading to Chung On Street. This formed the early structure of the Tsuen Wan pedestrian network.

The ground level of Nan Fung Centre serves as a bus terminal, or the Tsuen Wan Station Public Transport Interchange. The first and second floors are shopping malls focused on local businesses, with some shops facing the semi-outdoor elevated passage, resembling street-level retail spaces. The pedestrian bridges bring heavy foot traffic to Nan Fung Centre, and in 1986, the Tsuen Kam Centre was connected to the network, expanding the northern section. However, Tsuen Kam Centre did not continue the semi-outdoor passage design of Nan Fung Centre. In 1987, four shopping malls—Tsuen Fung Centre, Waldorf Centre, Tsuen Cheong Centre, and Ho Fai Commercial Centre, built on the podium of four private residential estates—were connected to the northern network via Tsuen Fung Centre, integrating with the Tsuen Wan Multi-Storey Car Park Building. These four malls are also connected by pedestrian bridges, creating a chain effect. In 1989, the popular small business shopping mall Citistore joined the northern network through a pedestrian bridge connected to Tsuen Fung Centre, allowing residents to shop without setting foot on the ground.

The northern section of the network expanded again in the 1990s. In 1991, the government built a 200-meter-long pedestrian bridge over Castle Peak Road and Kwan Mun Hau Street, connecting it to Indi Home in 1997. Discovery Park, completed in 1998, was developed by the developer who constructed a 600-meter-long pedestrian bridge connecting Tsuen Wan Station to D·PARK. This completed the 1.5-kilometer-long northern section of the network. The 8½ Shopping Mall also has a passage connected to the footbridge. The size of the Discovery Park footbridge was rare in Hong Kong at the time, becoming a model for covered footbridges connecting large shopping malls in other districts. The branch of the Discovery Park footbridge leading to the Tsuen Wan Government Offices High Block was completed and opened in 2001. After New World Development completed the renovation of Tsuen Kam Centre, they began researching the construction of a pedestrian bridge connecting their Grand City Plaza in 2004. The Grand City Plaza is now part of the Tsuen Wan Pedestrian Footbridge Network.

=== Southern Section ===
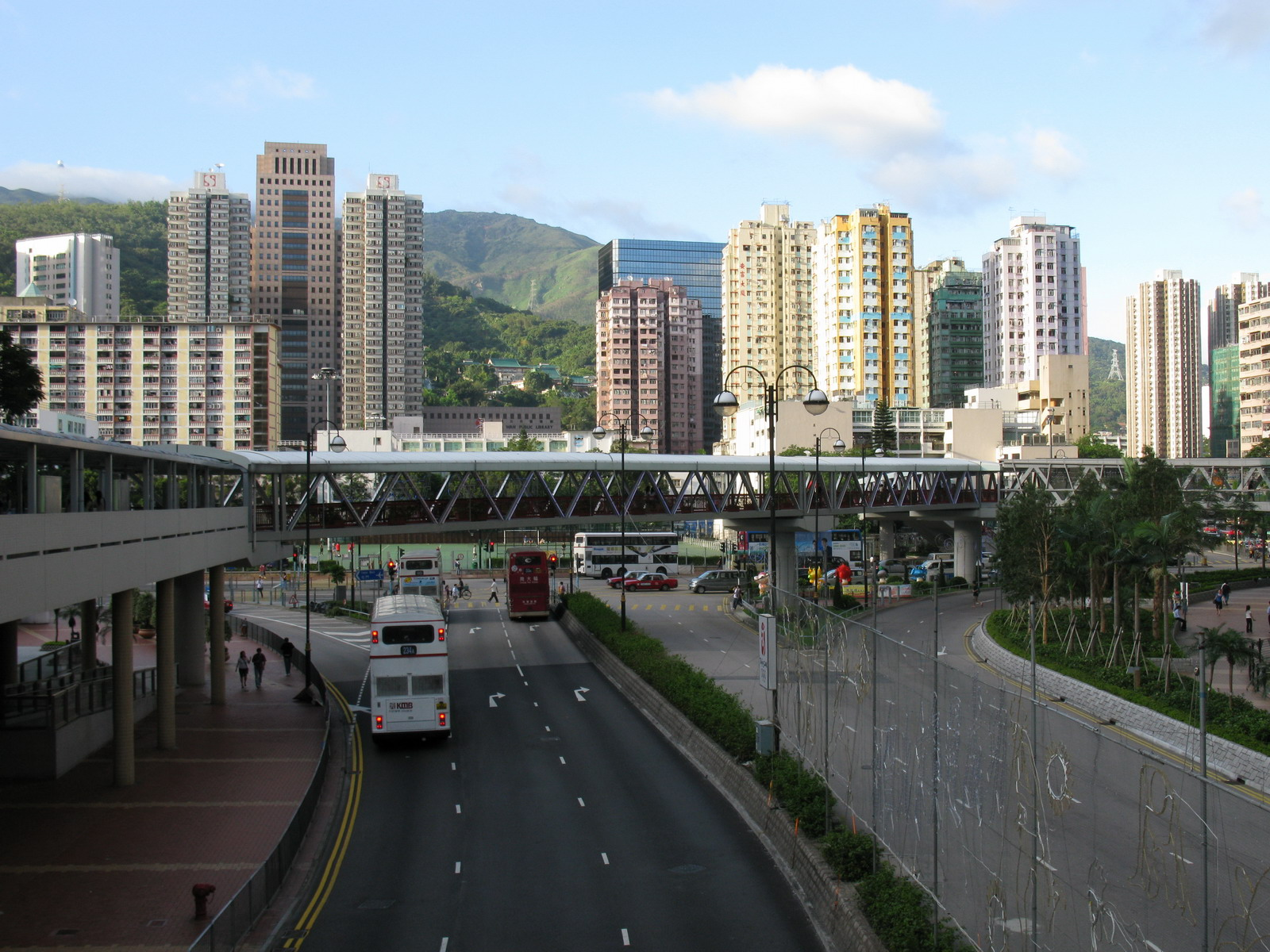
The pedestrian bridge connecting the Tsuen Wan Town Hall pedestrian platform (near the left side), the Tai Ho Road near the Princess Alexandra Community Centre, and Citywalk (not shown in the picture).

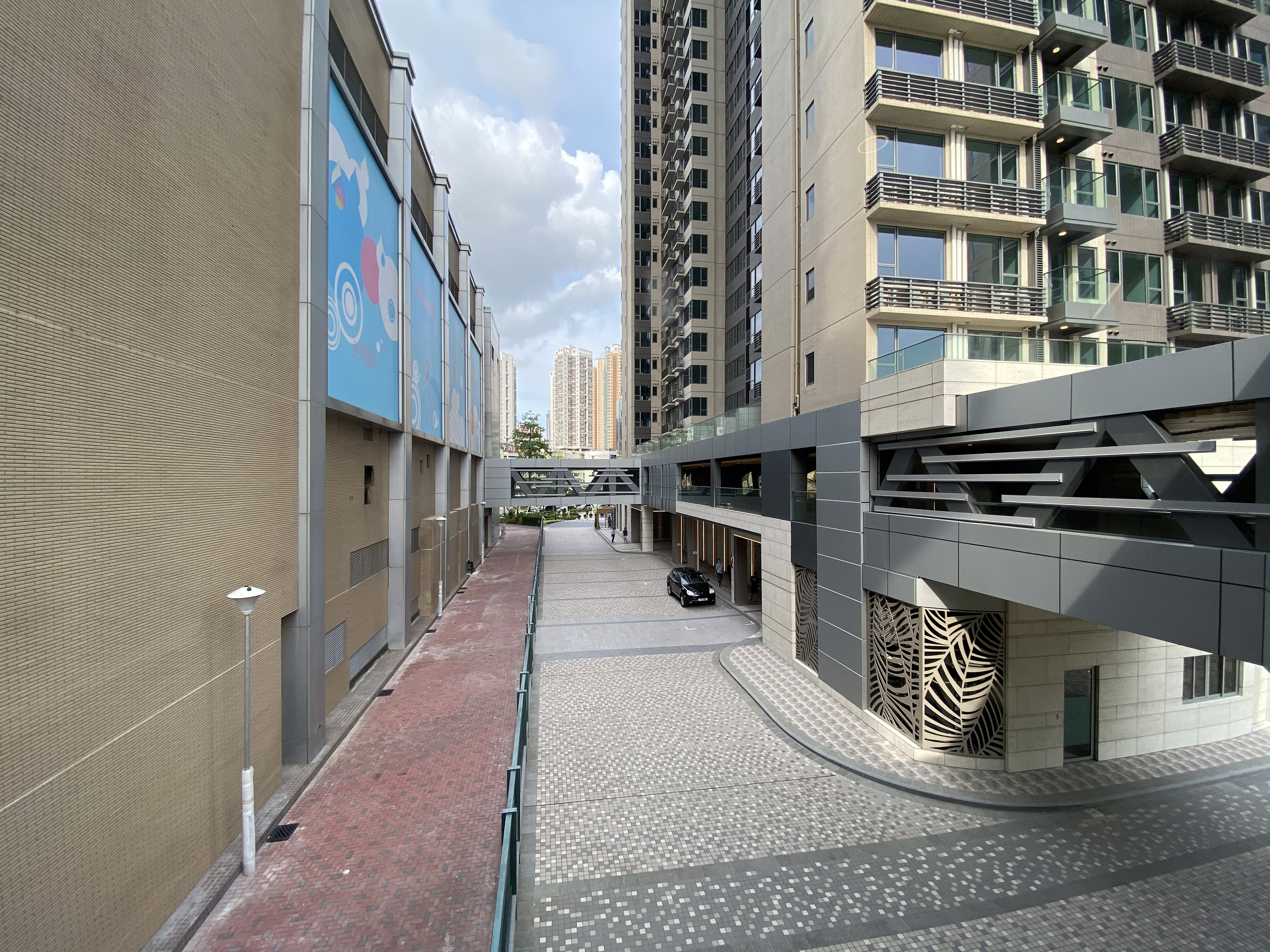
The pedestrian bridge connecting Phase 2 of Citywalk and The Aurora.

Tsuen Wan Town Hall, which opened in 1980, drew from the experience of Hong Kong City Hall and improved upon it, offering residents of Tsuen Wan a quality yet relatively affordable venue for cultural activities. It was integrated with other public facilities to emphasize the importance of public buildings in new towns. Tsuen Wan Town Hall has a dedicated pedestrian platform, which is now part of the pedestrian bridge network. Originally, this platform was part of the overall public building plan, and adjacent land was initially designated for the construction of a government complex. This complex was intended to integrate with the Town Hall via a large platform, and a pedestrian bridge was planned to connect to the Four Seasons Estate (now Vision City). As such, when Tsuen Wan Town Hall was built, a small portion of the pedestrian platform within the Town Hall's boundary was constructed alongside it. The government complex was initially expected to begin construction after the relocation of the Tsuen Wan Ferry Bus Terminus. However, the complex was never built there, and the land eventually became the Tsuen Wan Town Hall Plaza.

In 1983, due to land reclamation, the Tsuen Wan Ferry was relocated to the newly built Tsuen Wan Transport Complex. The complex included a bus terminal, minibus station, taxi stand, public parking, government offices, and a few retail and dining spaces. When it was completed, the surrounding land was still awaiting development, and apart from the waterfront side where the ferry was located, the area was surrounded by roads. Therefore, users needed to utilize the pedestrian bridge on the platform level to reach the town center. The complex was designed almost exclusively for vehicles, with a bold and futuristic design, particularly evident in the bus terminal, where each platform had a separate staircase leading to the platform, resembling 15 sets of red columns rising upward. Surrounding residential projects, such as Clague Garden Estate (completed in 1989), Tsuen Wan Plaza (1990), and Skyline Plaza (1995), were connected to the complex via pedestrian bridges. Although the Hong Kong government hoped the complex would become a major transportation hub along the Tsuen Wan waterfront, delays in waterfront development and changes in transportation policy led to low foot traffic, with the complex being taken over by the homeless and facing security issues.

In 1998, a pedestrian bridge from Tsuen Wan Town Hall's pedestrian platform connected to Tsuen Wan Plaza, and in 2001, another bridge crossing Sha Tsui Road was added, preparing for the future construction of a pedestrian bridge along Tai Ho Road. The first phase of the Citywalk shopping mall and Nina Tower Phase 1 were connected to the pedestrian bridges of Tsuen Wan Town Hall and Citywalk Phase 2 Mall, and Yeung Uk Road Municipal Services Building in 2007 and 2009, respectively, gradually shaping the southern section network. Additionally, in 1998, the Hong Kong government decided to build the West Rail. Due to further reclamation, the Tsuen Wan Ferry was once again relocated, and the transport complex was eventually connected to Tsuen Wan West Station after the West Rail was operational. However, this reduced foot traffic on the complex’s platform. The complex was eventually demolished in 2013 for residential development, meaning it never fully served its role as a transport hub.

The demolition of the complex also temporarily disconnected Tsuen Wan West Station from the pedestrian bridge networkuthern section network entered a new phase after the completion of the Ocean Pride and nearby Nina Tower Phase 2, above Tsuen Wan West Station, in 2019. Nina Tower Phase 2 was built on the site of the former transport complex, with a land lease requirement to construct five pedestrian bridges connecting Tsuen Wan West Station and nearby public transport interchanges and buildings, restoring the original connectivity of the complex. Tsuen Wan West Station thus became the starting point of the southern section network. The surrounding projects near Tsuen Wan West Station covered a large area, and the internal layout of Ocean Pride’s mall emphasized the shopping experience over traditional linear connectivity. As a result, pedestrians found it harder to identify the direction of exits, often needing to look for signs when entering the mall from one pedestrian bridge and searching for another. Vision City and Plaza 88 were completed the following year, both featuring pedestrian bridges connecting Citywalk and the existing bridge network, allowing pedestrians to access Chelsea Court, H Cube, Indi Home, and the Texaco Road Industrial Area via the bridge system.

=== Expansion Project ===
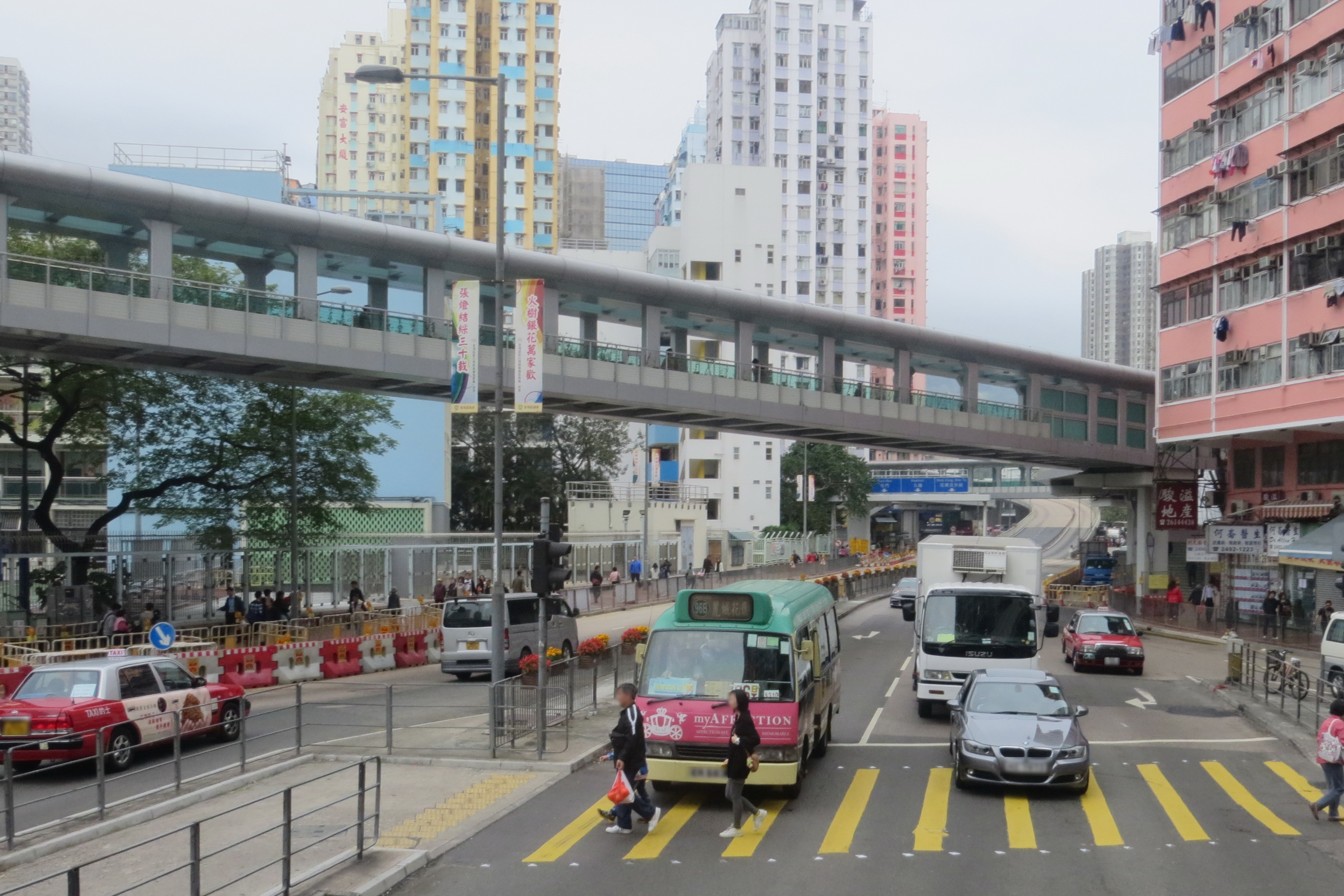
The Tsuen Wan Pedestrian Bridge Network Expansion Project includes pedestrian bridge "A" (Bridge A) along Tai Ho Road, near Sha Tsui Road.

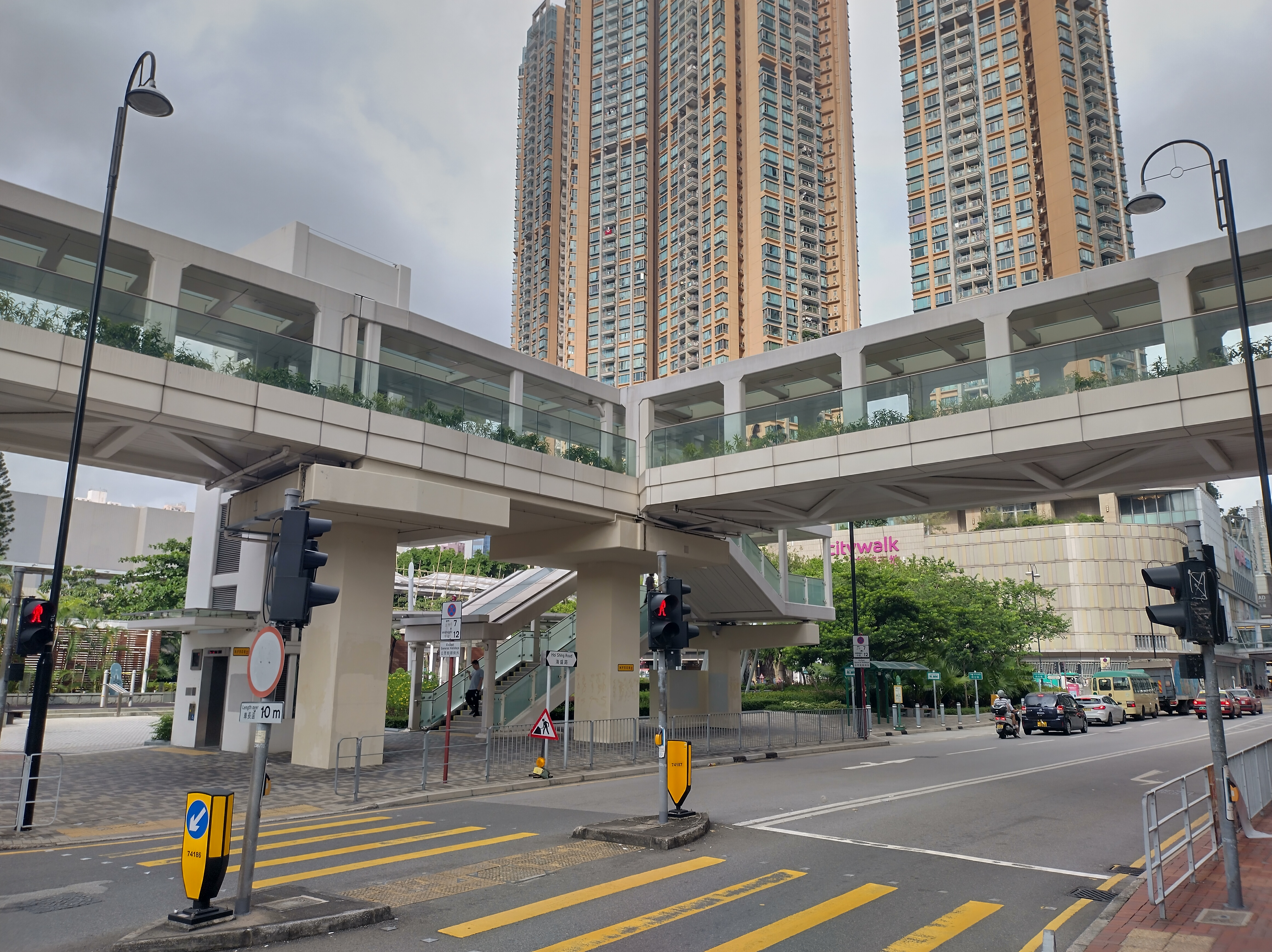
The Tsuen Wan Pedestrian Bridge Network Expansion Project includes Pedestrian bridge "D" (Bridge D), which connects Tsuen Wan Plaza, Skyline Plaza, and the nearby landscaped area.

The Tsuen Wan District Council once attributed the slow development along Tsuen Wan’s waterfront to a lack of pedestrian facilities, viewing pedestrian bridges as a potential solution to stimulate development. In the early days of Tsuen Wan Plaza's opening in 1990, it relied on shuttle buses between the mall and Tsuen Wan Station to bring in foot traffic. At that time, the developer, Sun Hung Kai Properties, expressed willingness to build a pedestrian bridge connecting to Tai Ho Road, but the plan did not materialize. Meanwhile, the Territory Development Department had begun studying the construction of a pedestrian bridge along Tai Ho Road in 1989.

The earliest proposals for the expansion of the Tsuen Wan Pedestrian Bridge Network included pedestrian bridge "A" along Tai Ho Road, pedestrian bridge "B" along Tai Chung Road and Hoi Shing Road, and pedestrian bridge "C" along Kwun Mun Hau Street and Luen Yan Street. However, the original plan for Bridge A, which required crossing Tai Ho Road and running along residential buildings, also involved removing pedestrian safety islands in the middle of the road. In a 2002 meeting of the Tsuen Wan District Council’s Traffic and Transport Committee, Bridge A was described as "the least acceptable" proposal. As a result, the Highways Department revised the design of Bridge A, routing it from On Lok Tsuen No. 3 near Hau Tei Square to a pedestrian bridge across Sha Tsui Road, avoiding the two planned safety islands and Tin Po Building.

In 2007, the Hong Kong government gazetted the Tsuen Wan Pedestrian Bridge Network Expansion Project and began construction of Bridge A. It was originally scheduled for completion in 2011 but was delayed until 2013. The bridge has branches leading to Tsuen Wan Station and Fu Wah Centre, providing additional traffic dicrease for the existing network. The pedestrian bridge along Tai Ho Road took more than 20 years from planning to completion.

To accommodate the access points on both sides of Tai Ho Road, Bridge A was designed in a zigzag pattern, crossing the road twice and significantly altering the landscape. The bridge incorporates skylights to allow more natural light and includes green decorations on both sides. In some sections, opaque panels were installed to protect the privacy of nearby residents. Since the buildings on both sides of Tai Ho Road are mostly older structures, Bridge A seems somewhat out of place in the area, relying on stairs to connect pedestrians to the bridge, while nearby residents' activity spaces remain focused at ground level. Before the bridge opened, cracks had appeared in parts of it, and some netizens reported feeling vibrations while walking on it, describing the sensation as "shaking" or "wobbling."

After its opening, Bridge A connected the northern and southern segments of the network, creating an unprecedentedly large elevated pedestrian network. Walking from Tsuen Wan West Station to Panda Hotel via the pedestrian bridge network takes about half an hour. Due to heavy foot traffic in the northern network, many shops near Tsuen Wan Station are concentrated on the bridge level, leaving the adjacent Sai Lau Kok Garden surrounded by roads and difficult for pedestrians to access. Sai Lau Kok Garden was rebuilt with funding from the Tsuen Wan District Council in 2013 and has become more popular since its completion in 2019.

In addition, the proposal to build a pedestrian bridge connecting Tsuen Wan Plaza, Skyline Plaza, and the nearby landscaped area (Bridge D) was first raised in 2004. At that time, Sun Hung Kai Properties expressed a willingness to donate funds for the bridge linking Tsuen Wan Plaza and Skyline Plaza, but technical difficulties prevented the project from moving forward. The Highways Department submitted the design plan for Bridge D to the Tsuen Wan District Council’s Traffic and Transport Committee in 2007, and the plan received widespread support from council members. However, the construction plan for Bridge D was not gazetted until 2015. Construction began soon after, and the bridge was completed in 2019.

== Current condition ==
The Tsuen Wan pedestrian footbridge network experiences heavy foot traffic, especially in areas surrounding Tsuen Wan Station, which has attracted street vendors and other gatherings. The pedestrian bridge in front of Exit A of Tsuen Wan Station connects to the footbridge of Citywalk and nearby bus stations, as well as being close to Nan Fung Centre, resulting in a constant flow of people. The footbridge leading to Luk Yeung Galleria is one of the busiest spots. A 1994 report, Compilation of Tsuen Wan Traffic Conditions, mentioned the issue of vendors gathering in the semi-open skyway at Nan Fung Centre, and to this day, the pedestrian bridges near Tsuen Wan Station remain popular locations for telecom companies setting up booths, advertising banners, promotional personnel distributing leaflets, street performers, and beggars. Since the opening of Bridge A, this phenomenon has spread to the entrances and exits of this bridge as well.

Due to the large volume of pedestrian traffic on the footbridges, people tend to walk at a faster pace on narrower bridges like the one in front of Luk Yeung Galleria, and slower on wider ones like the footbridge of Citywalk. In 2015, Hong Kong Legislative Council member Ben Chan mentioned the high usage rate of the Tsuen Wan pedestrian footbridge network, noting that during peak hours, pedestrians often brush shoulders. However, not all bridges within the network experience high traffic. For example, during peak hours in 2017, the two-way pedestrian flow on Bridge A was around 1,700 people per hour, which is less than half of the Transport Department's 2007 estimate of around 4,000 people per hour. The pedestrian bridges and internal passageways leading to Chelsea Court, Indi Home, H Cube, and Texaco Road Industrial Zone are isolated areas carved out of buildings, with minimal connection to the outside streets, resulting in lower pedestrian flow.

== Management and maintenance ==
Although most of the pedestrian bridges are open for public use, many of them in the Tsuen Wan network were not built as public facilities by the government but by developers. Former president of the Hong Kong Institute of Surveyors, Vincent Ho Kui-yip, stated that around the 1980s, the Hong Kong government began including requirements in land lease agreements for private development projects to build pedestrian bridges. Many of the bridges in the Tsuen Wan network were constructed by developers according to such lease clauses. For example, the bridge in front of Tsuen Wan Station is managed by the MTR, while the corner of Bridge A is managed by the government. Some developers, including the MTR, will expel those engaging in promotions, street performances, or begging on bridges under their management. Some internal passageways connected to the pedestrian bridge network, such as those in Tsuen Wan Plaza, are not open to the public 24 hours a day, raising issues concerning management authority and responsibility for opening hours.

== Future development ==
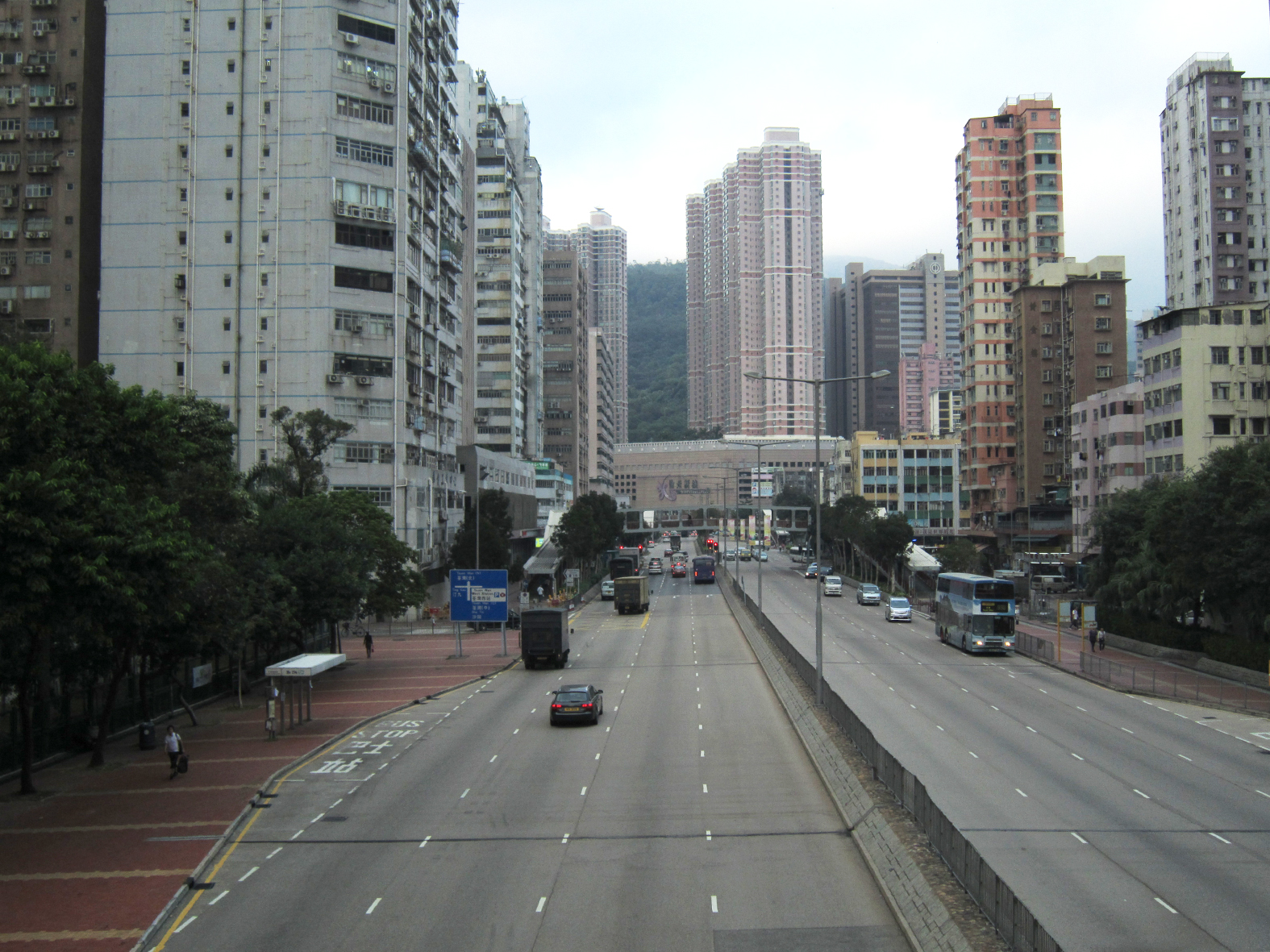
One of the three pedestrian bridges crossing Tai Chung Road. In the future, it will be connected to the pedestrian bridge network via 'Pedestrian Bridge B' (Bridge B), which runs along Tai Chung Road and Hoi Shing Road.

The Tsuen Wan pedestrian footbridge network is set to expand, with the Hong Kong government gazetting the expansion project in 2007. In addition to Bridge A, completed in 2013, and Bridge D, completed in 2019, the expansion plan includes Bridge B (along Tai Chung Road and Hoi Shing Road), Bridge C (along Kwan Mun Hau Street and Luen Yan Street), and Bridge E (along Ma Tau Pa Road and Wing Shun Street). Bridge B aims to connect the three existing pedestrian bridges over Tai Chung Road, while Bridges C and E will link pedestrian bridges over Kwan Mun Hau Street, Sha Tsui Road, Luen Yan Street, and Ma Tau Pa Road. The earliest expansion plan only included Bridges A, B, and C, and the project was downgraded to a Category C public works plan in 2003. It was not reinstated to Category B until September 2005.

Of the three pedestrian bridges crossing Tai Chung Road, two, along with the bridge over Luen Yan Street, are among the few isolated bridges in Tsuen Wan that are not connected to the network. The former is the only way to cross Tai Chung Road from the Chai Wan Kok industrial area due to the nearby exit of Route 5, while the latter exists because of the construction plans for Bridge C. The government plans to connect these isolated bridges through Bridges B, C, and E. The proposal for Bridge B, which will connect to the existing footbridge at Citywalk to the north and Tsuen Wan Plaza to the south, was recommended for gazettal in March 2021. Meanwhile, the Highways Department awarded consultancy contracts for Bridges C and E in 2019. However, the construction of Bridges C and E faces significant challenges, such as narrow roads on Kwan Mun Hau Street and underground drainage systems preventing construction at the center of Tai Chung Road. This would result in obstructed views for nearby residents. Bridge B’s alignment near Po On Commercial Association Wong Siu Ching Secondary School and adjacent residential areas was supported by the Tsuen Wan District Council’s Traffic and Transport Committee in 2002 but faced opposition from locals. The Highways Department revised the alignment to the industrial area side based on local consultations. As of 2024, Bridge B is awaiting funding approval and tendering procedures from the Legislative Council, while the alignment and connection arrangements for Bridge E are under review. Plans for Bridge C have been suspended due to strong opposition from residents along its proposed route.

== Bibliography ==
- 胡, 漢傑; 陳, 智峰 (2022). 天空之城：香港行人天橋的觀察與想像 (in Chinese). 三联书店(香港)有限公司. pp. 144–177. ISBN 978-962-04-4994-9.
