= Sai Lau Kok Garden =

Urban public park in Hong Kong

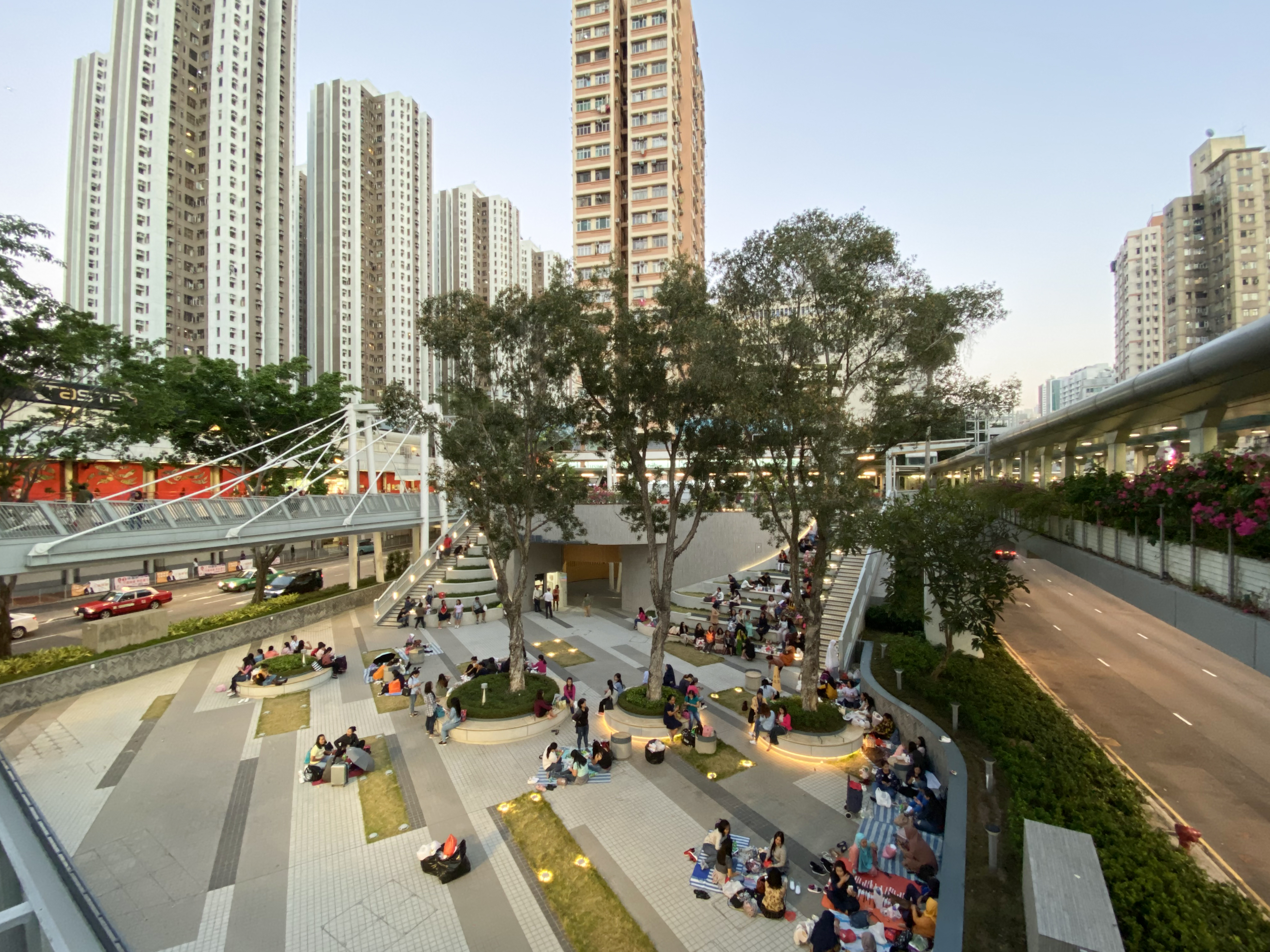
- Interactive map of Sai Lau Kok Garden
- Type: Public park
- Location: Hong Kong New Territories Tsuen Wan
- Coordinates: 22°22′23″N 114°07′04″E22.3731207|114.1178401

Sai Lau Kok Garden is a public park located in Tsuen Wan, New Territories, Hong Kong. Managed by the Leisure and Cultural Services Department, the garden covers an area of approximately 2,748 square meters. It is situated adjacent to the Tsuen Wan MTR station and remains open 24 hours a day. The upper level of the garden is connected to the Tsuen Wan footbridge network, while the lower level houses a multi-purpose activity center.

Originally constructed in 1987 as part of the Hong Kong Development Department’s environmental beautification initiatives, the garden underwent a major redevelopment under the Community Signature Project Scheme (Tsuen Wan District), coordinated by the Home Affairs Department (Project No.: 461RO). The redevelopment, which cost approximately HK$95 million, sparked public controversy. Critics referred to it as a potential “white elephant” project, citing concerns over large-scale tree removal, premature commencement of works, and disturbances to nearby residents. The garden was officially closed for reconstruction on November 7, 2016, and redevelopment work commenced on November 11, 2016. Upon completion, Sai Lau Kok Garden was reopened to the public on September 25, 2019.

== History ==
Sai Lau Kok Garden is located in the center of Tsuen Wan, covering an area of approximately 2,748 square metres. It was originally constructed in 1987 as part of a landscaping initiative by the former Territory Development Department. Situated at ground level near Tsuen Wan MTR Station, the garden initially lacked direct access to the station exits, resulting in relatively low usage—particularly on weekdays. At the time, its primary features included a symmetrical fountain design, seating areas, and a total of 73 trees planted throughout the garden. Additional facilities such as pavilions and benches were also available.

In conjunction with the Hong Kong Government’s Signature Community Project Scheme, the Tsuen Wan District Council proposed a redevelopment plan to transform Sai Lau Kok Garden into a podium-style garden. The project aimed to introduce multiple new access points—including barrier-free passages—linking the garden to the existing elevated pedestrian bridge network surrounding Tsuen Wan Station. A multi-purpose activity center was also planned for the ground level to accommodate small to medium-sized community events. These changes were intended to address accessibility issues and optimize the use of the space by adding a range of community-friendly features.

The Tsuen Wan District Council approved the reconstruction proposal on 26 March 2013, followed by approval from the Legislative Council Public Works Subcommittee on 30 June 2015. The garden was officially closed on 7 November 2016 to make way for construction, which began on 11 November 2016.

The redevelopment incorporated a variety of energy-saving and renewable energy technologies, such as a fresh air supply monitoring system with carbon dioxide sensors and solar-powered lighting. During construction, some design modifications were made—for instance, the original canopy design consisting of three canvas structures was later revised to use three mesh panels instead.

In an interview with Hong Kong 01 on 17 July 2019, then Tsuen Wan District Councillor Law Siu-kit stated that the reconstruction was nearing completion. Sai Lau Kok Garden officially reopened to the public on 25 September 2019. Following its reopening, the garden became a venue for various community events, including documentary screenings such as The Thick Earth and the High Sky and The Lost Archives. The reconstruction significantly boosted the garden’s popularity, making it more actively used than ever before.

=== Reconstruction Project Details ===
The detailed scope of the Sai Lau Kok Garden redevelopment project includes the following components:

1.A portion of the site near Fu Wah Centre, occupying approximately half of the original garden area, was elevated to footbridge level to create a podium garden that seamlessly connects to the existing elevated pedestrian walkway at Fu Wah Centre.

2.Beneath the newly constructed podium garden, a multi-purpose activity centre was built, comprising a multi-functional activity room and other essential ancillary facilities.

3.The project also involved landscaping with elements such as small lawns, flowers, and ornamental plants to enhance the garden’s role as a public open space.

4.On the opposite side of the garden, a green platform was constructed, along with a pedestrian suspension bridge that links to the existing footbridge and podium garden along Castle Peak Road – Tsuen Wan.

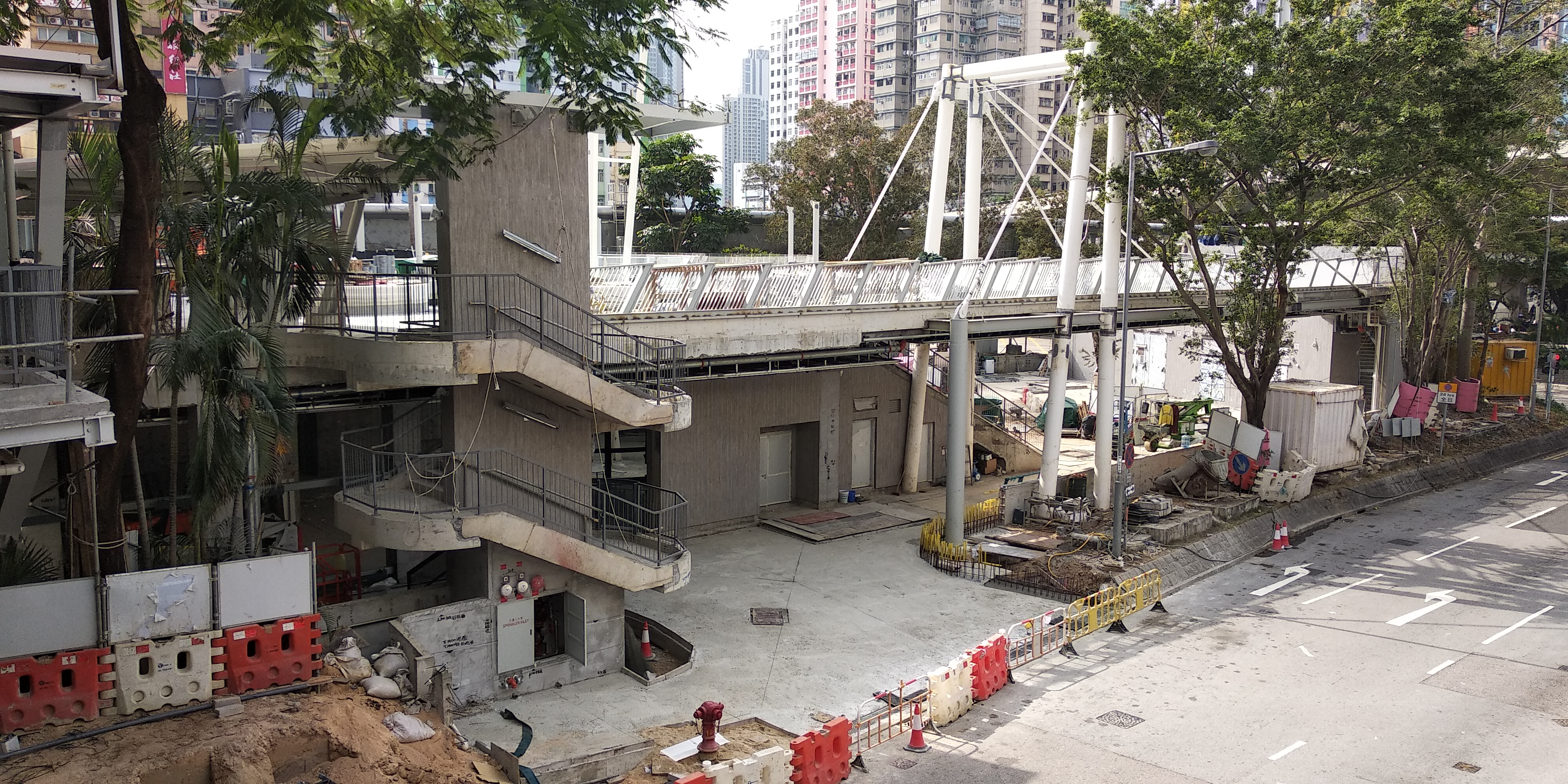
The West Building Corner Garden under reconstruction (photo taken on

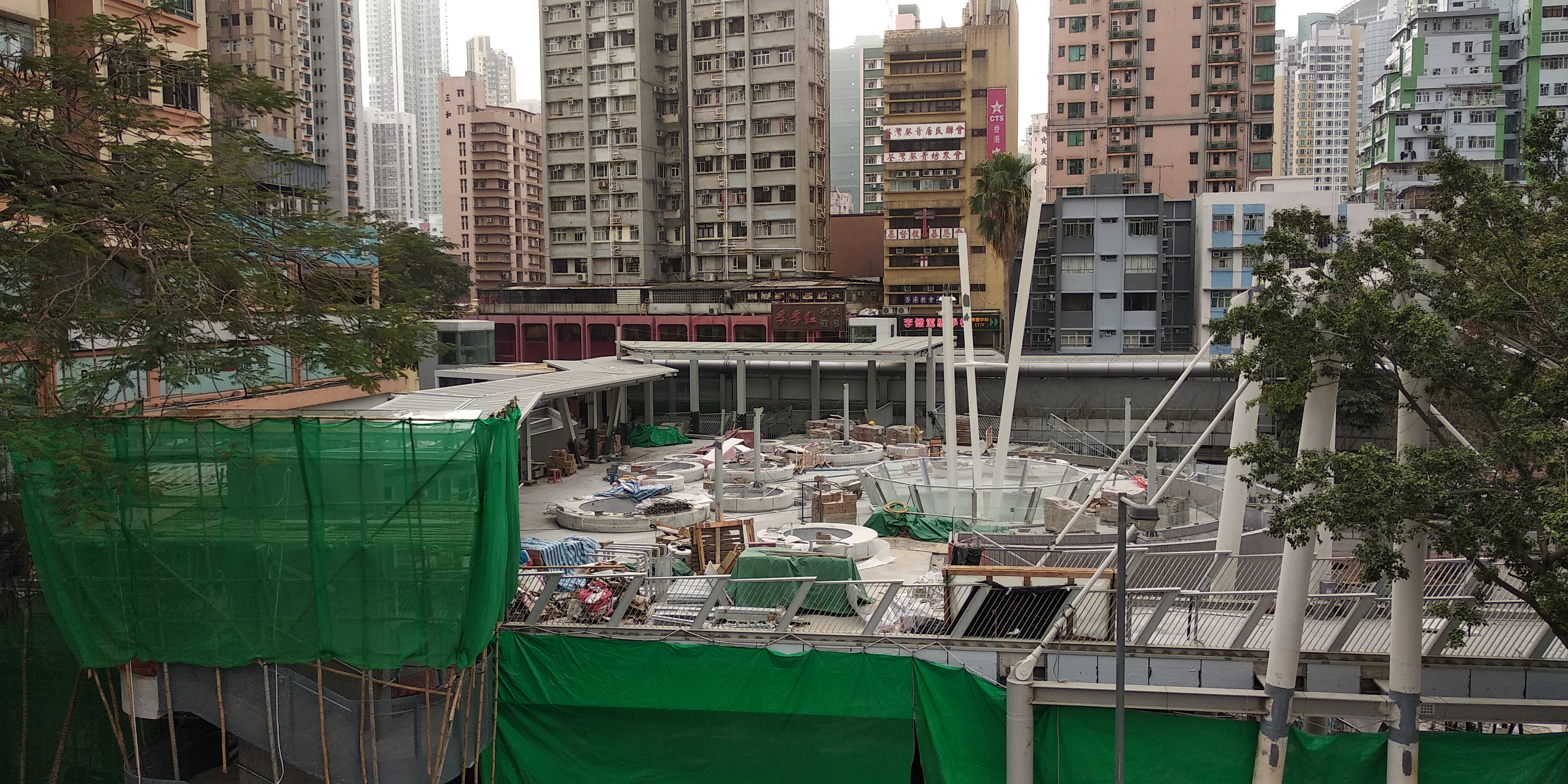
The West Building Corner Garden under reconstruction (photo taken on February 8, 2019)

5.Additionally, several auxiliary facilities, including a power transformer room, main switch room, and pump room, were installed beneath the new green platform to support the operation of both the multi-purpose activity centre and the garden itself.

== Design and facilities ==
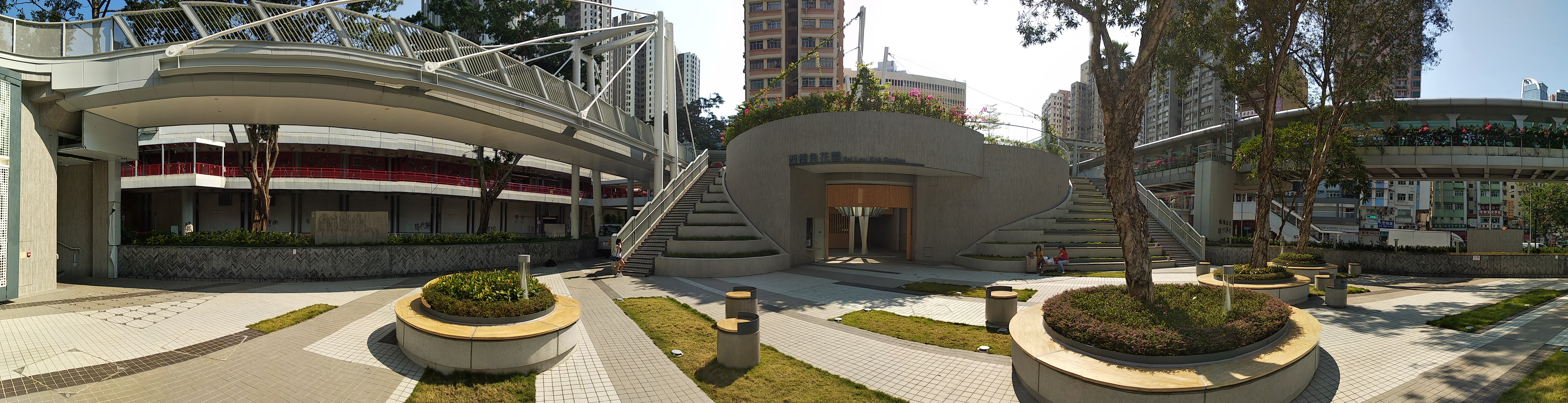
Panoramic view of the lower level of the West Building Corner Garden

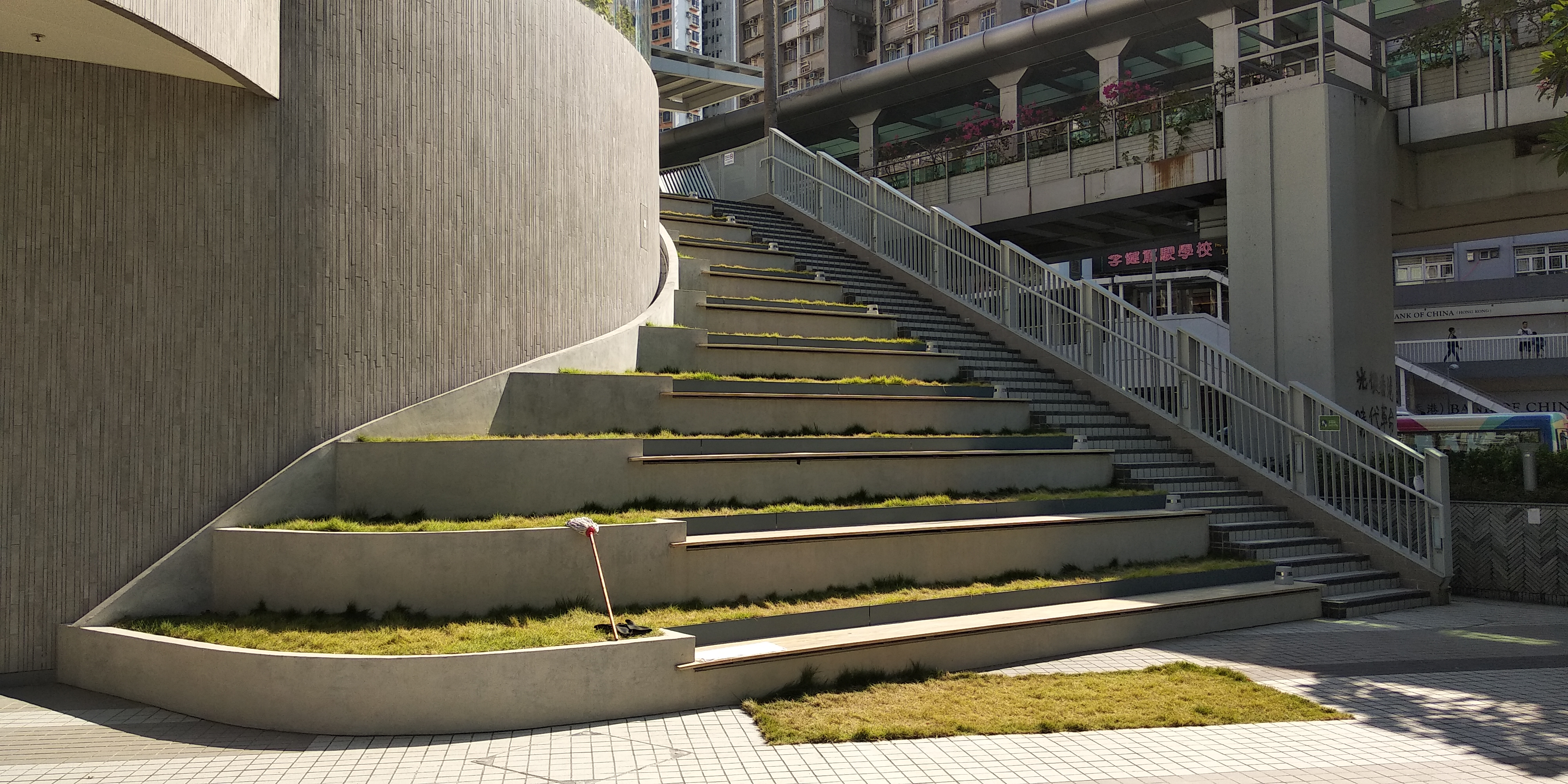
The stepped design of the West Building Corner Garden

The redevelopment of Sai Lau Kok Garden was planned by Dooley Planning Consultants Ltd. The garden is structured on two levels—upper and lower—which are connected through a stepped architectural design. Landscaped features are incorporated on both the elevated platform and parts of the ground level to promote environmental sustainability and aesthetic enhancement. Additionally, the exterior wall of the plant room facing the river has been decorated with vertical greenery as part of the beautification initiative. The garden also includes several popular photo spots or “check-in points” designed to engage visitors and enhance their experience. In a 2015 interview with Stand News, then Chairman of the Tsuen Wan District Council, Chan Yiu-sing, noted that the redesigned garden adopts an open-plan layout to encourage public activities such as exercise and Tai Chi practice.

=== Pedestrian Bridge ===
The redeveloped Sai Lau Kok Garden features three connecting bridges designed to enhance accessibility between the surrounding area and the garden itself. One of the bridges links the ground level near HSBC at Fu Wah Centre to Castle Peak Road–Tsuen Wan, the garden, and the nearby town hall. Another is a covered walkway that provides direct access between Fu Wah Centre and Tsuen Wan MTR Station. The third is a suspension bridge that connects the existing pedestrian network with the podium garden along Castle Peak Road–Tsuen Wan. A suspension design was chosen for this structure due to the presence of underground drainage systems in the area, which made it impossible to construct supporting piles.

=== Multi-purpose Activity Center ===
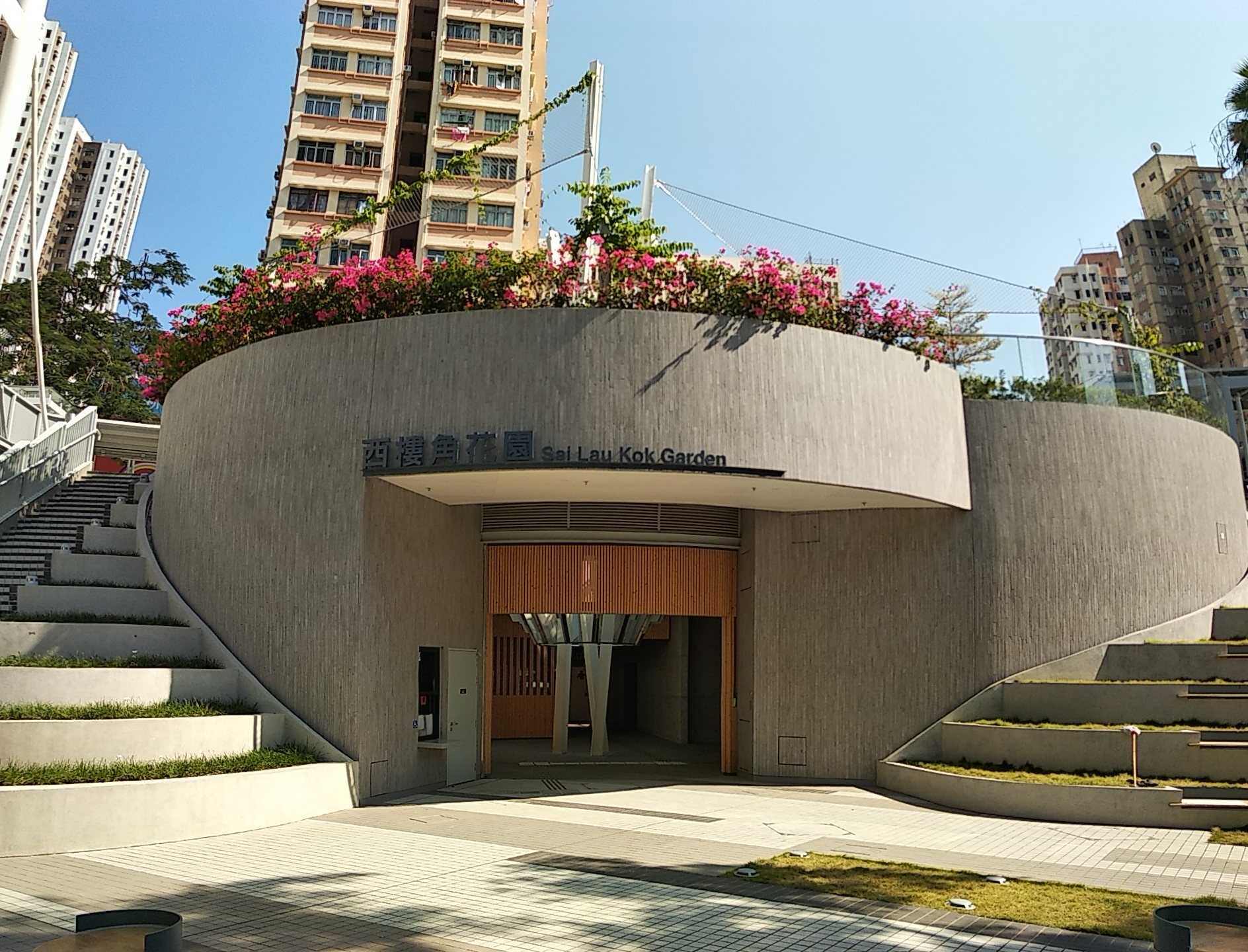
Multi-purpose Activity Center

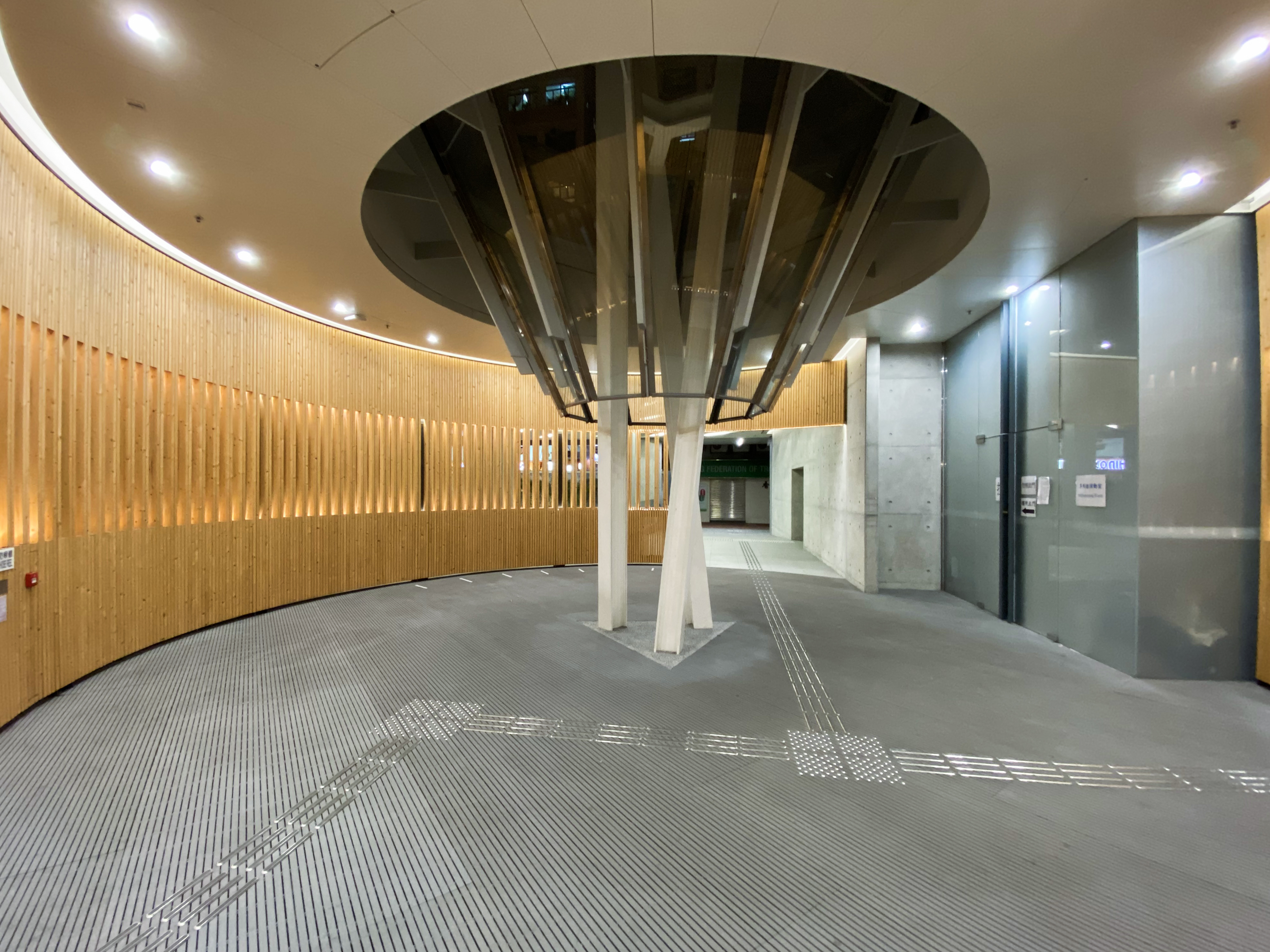
Entrance to the Multi-Purpose Activity Centre

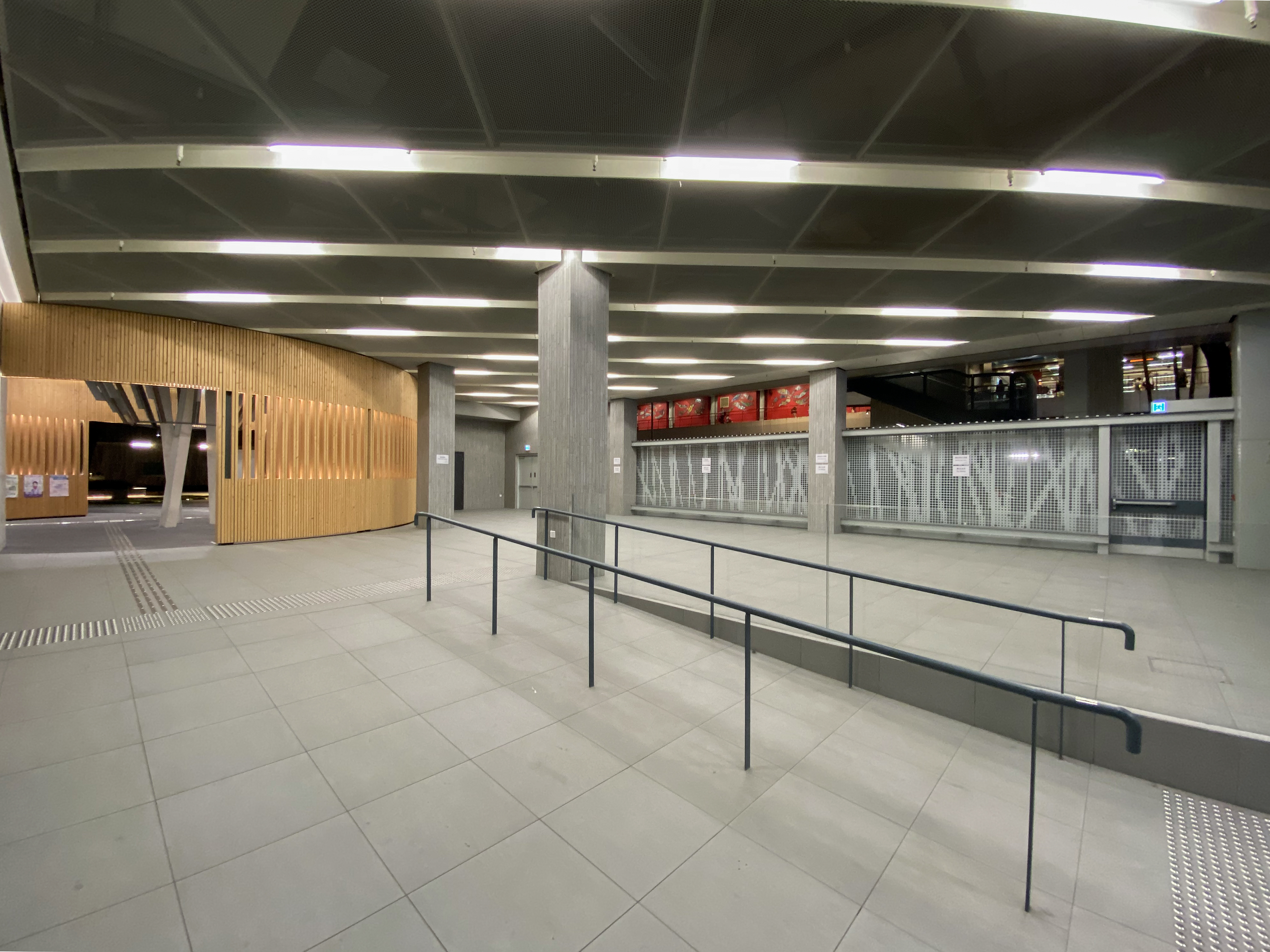
Covered space outside the multi-purpose activity center

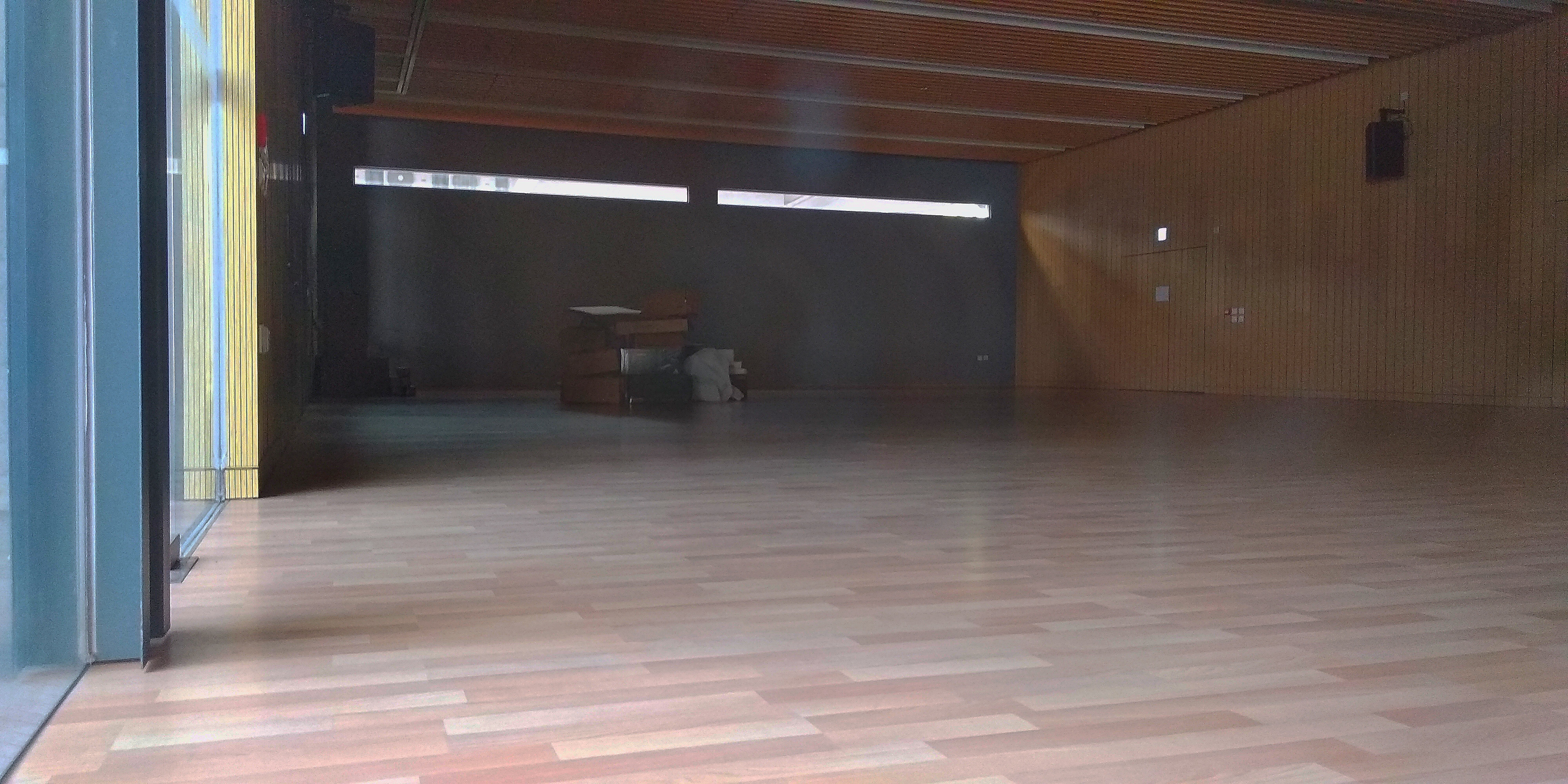
Multi-purpose activity room interior

The lower level of the redeveloped Sai Lau Kok Garden houses a multi-purpose activity centre, functioning as a community hall. The facility occupies approximately half of the garden area and includes a multi-purpose activity room with a capacity of up to 200 people, along with toilet facilities and a nursery. The community hall is managed by the Home Affairs Department and is available for rental by government departments, public institutions, registered societies, subvented welfare organizations, subsidized educational institutions, charitable groups, Legislative Council offices, District Council offices, and other government-approved local committees.

=== Design that incorporates the area’s history ===
Tsuen Wan was once home to many fishing villages, and this heritage inspired elements of the park’s design. For instance, the handrails are shaped like ladders to symbolize fish scales. The funnel-shaped structure above the entrance of the multi-purpose activity centre is designed to channel rainwater down to the underground entrance during wet weather. This feature was inspired by the original fountain that stood in Sai Lau Kok Garden prior to its redevelopment.

== Redevelopment Project Disputes ==
The reconstruction of Sai Lau Kok Garden sparked controversy, with critics labeling it a “white elephant” project. Concerns were also raised over large-scale tree removal, premature commencement of construction, and disturbances caused to nearby residents. However, despite these objections, the project ultimately moved forward.

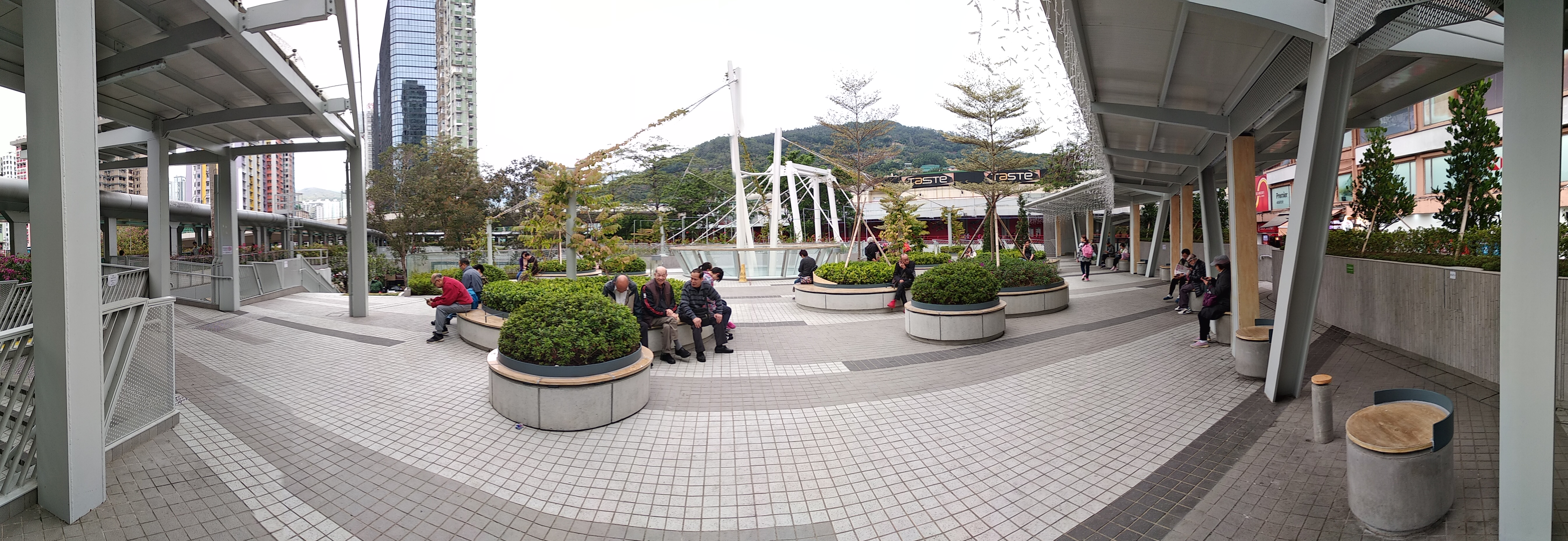
Panoramic view of the upper floor of the West Building Corner Garden

=== Cost-effectiveness ===
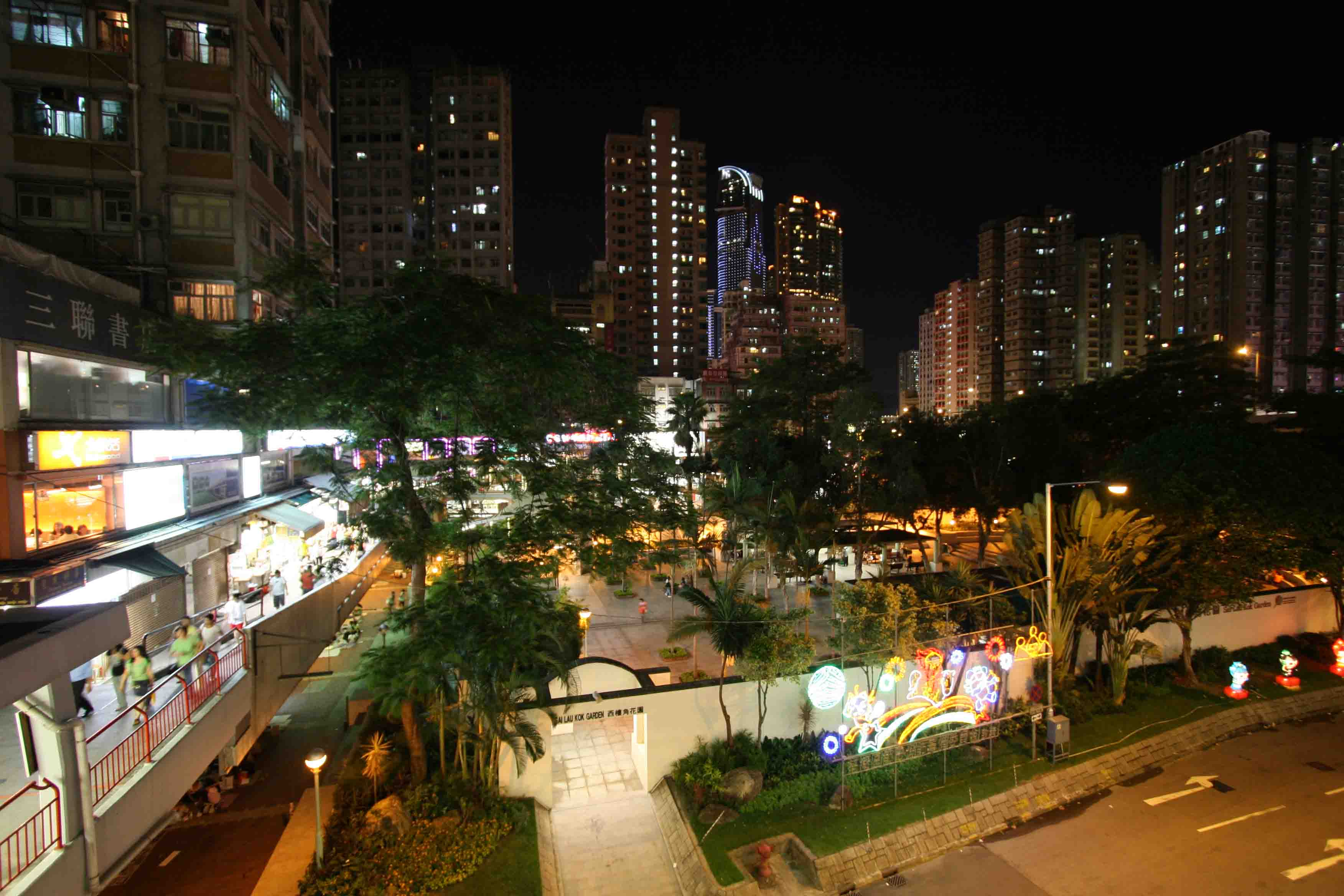
The West Building Corner Garden before reconstruction (photo taken on August 3, 2008)

Some local residents considered the reconstruction of Sai Lau Kok Garden to be a “white elephant” project and a misuse of public funds. Labour Party member Chiu En-lai criticized the decision-making process, noting that the Tsuen Wan District Council approved the project just two months after then-Chief Executive Leung Chun-ying announced a plan to allocate HK$100 million to each district for community development. Chiu described the decision as rushed and dismissive of public opinion. A political party conducted a survey within the district and reported that 58% of the 212 respondents opposed the reconstruction plan.Civic Party member Chan Wan-sum stated that he had proposed building a transport interchange on the site, but the idea was rejected. In response, pro-establishment politician Chan Hang-bin of the Democratic Alliance for the Betterment and Progress of Hong Kong explained that while he also supported the idea of a transport hub, it faced opposition from nearby residents who were concerned about its impact on the local landscape.

Several pro-democracy members of the Hong Kong Legislative Council raised concerns about the cost-effectiveness of the Sai Lau Kok Garden redevelopment project. Lee Cheuk-yan of the Labour Party noted that the proposed reconstruction would add only a multi-purpose activity room of approximately 2,000 square feet, at an estimated cost of around HK$100 million. Chan Heng-pan argued in favor of the project, stating that the nearby footbridge in Tsuen Wan was frequently overcrowded, and the redevelopment could help alleviate pedestrian congestion. He also highlighted the high utilization rate of community halls in the Tsuen Wan area, which ranged between 80% and 100%, driven in part by population growth. Regarding the seemingly limited size of the new activity room, Chan explained that underground drainage systems and substantial engineering work contributed to the high construction costs, and even the HK$100 million budget might prove insufficient. On August 16, 2015, at midday, several pro-democracy groups held a petition at the garden, urging the government to halt the project. They criticized the budget, pointing out that spending HK$100 million on a 2,000-square-foot facility equated to HK$50,000 per square foot—an amount they claimed was higher than the price per square foot of luxury properties on The Peak.

In a 2019 interview with Hong Kong 01, then–Tsuen Wan District Councillor Wong Wai-kit stated that, based on government infrastructure spending at the time, a project costing HK$100 million was not considered expensive. He noted that although Sai Lau Kok Garden occupied a prime location in the heart of Tsuen Wan, its usage rate had previously been low. However, he believed that usage would increase following the garden’s redevelopment. Later that year, after the reconstruction of Sai Lau Kok Garden was completed and the site reopened to the public, Labour Party member Chiu Yan-loy told Hong Kong 01 that while some residents used the space for rest and dancing on weekdays, overall usage remained limited. He added that the garden attracted the most visitors during screenings of Leung Tin-kei’s documentary The Thick Earth and the High Sky and The Lost Archives. Chiu criticized the redevelopment, arguing that it was unnecessary to spend such a large sum of money to demolish and rebuild the garden.

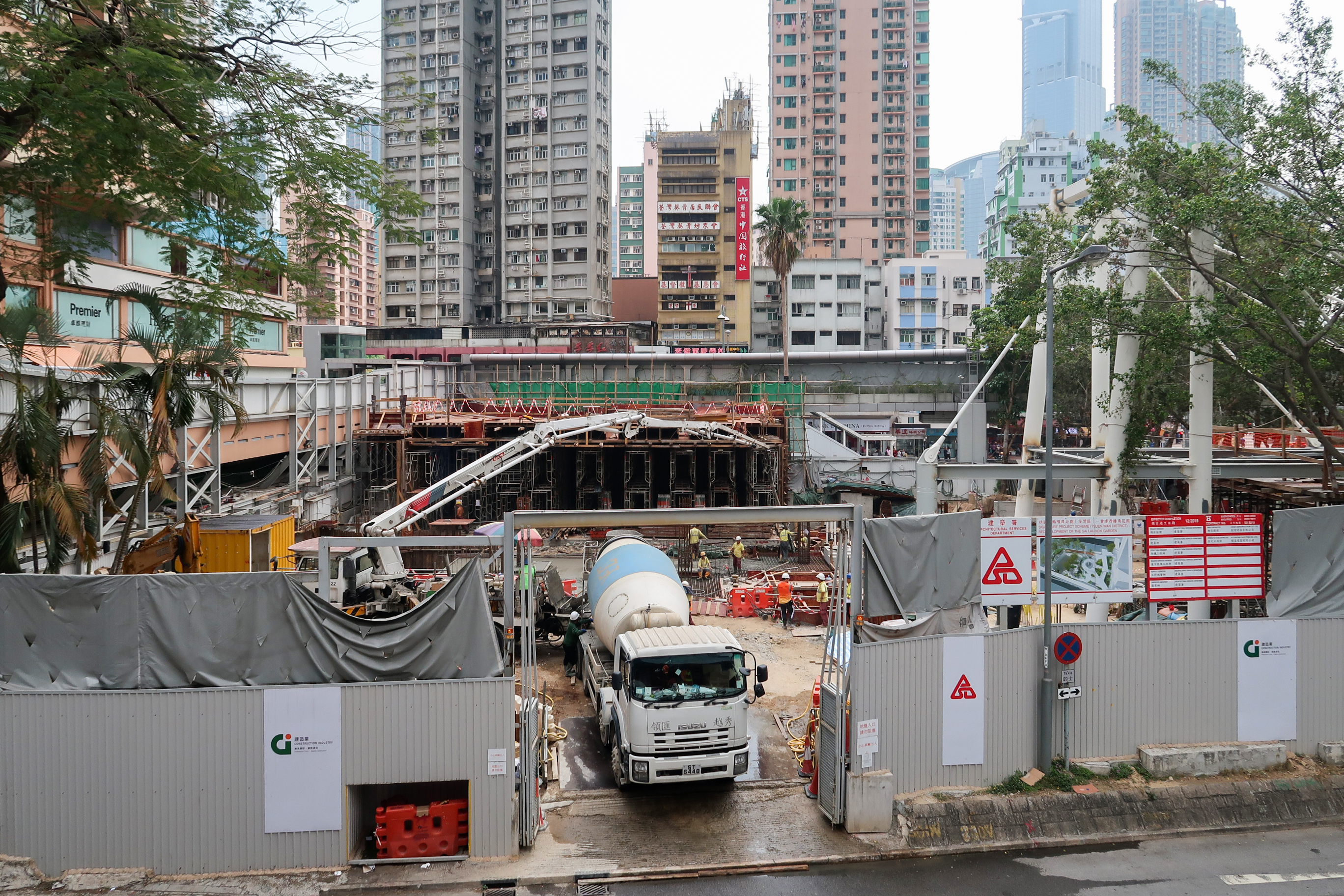
A large number of trees were cut down during the reconstruction of the garden, which caused criticism from several pro-democracy organizations (Photo taken on March 29, 2018)

=== Massive logging and rush to start construction ===
On 14 August 2015, workers commissioned by the Architectural Services Department removed four trees from Sai Lau Kok Garden. At the time, the garden’s redevelopment project had only been approved by the Legislative Council’s Public Works Subcommittee and had not yet received funding approval from the Finance Committee. On 16 August at noon, several pro-democracy groups held a petition at the site, criticizing the government for pushing ahead with the project and removing trees before securing full funding approval. Wong Pui-chi, community director of the New Democratic Alliance’s Green Yeung District, stated that government departments had already fenced off the area and demolished the pavilion as early as April. The groups called on the government to halt what they described as a “rushed” project. They also raised concerns about the environmental impact of the redevelopment. After reconstruction, the garden was slated to have a roof, which would result in only 24 of the original 73 trees being preserved. Critics argued that constructing a 2,000-square-foot activity room at such high cost did not justify the scale of demolition and tree removal.

=== Nuisance to nearby residents ===
In 2015, then–Legislative Council member and People Power representative Chan Wai-yip expressed concerns that the rebuilt Sai Lau Kok Garden could become a gathering place for “auntie dance” groups, similar to those in Sam Tung Uk Park and Jockey Club Tak Wah Park, which had previously drawn noise complaints from nearby residents. He warned that the new plaza space might attract more groups for morning dance activities, potentially turning the site into an “auntie square” or “auntie dance center,” creating disturbances for the surrounding community. In a 2019 interview with Hong Kong 01, then–Tsuen Wan District Councillor Wong Wai-kit acknowledged that both councillors and residents had expressed similar concerns about Sai Lau Kok Garden becoming a hotspot for group dancing following its reopening. However, he emphasized that the garden, being a public space open 24 hours a day, is accessible to everyone. He added that any disturbances arising from such use would be addressed as needed, based on the actual situation.

== "Colorful Prisms" art installation ==
In the summer of 2023, the Tourism Commission organized the “Art Tour in Tsuen Wan,” during which Sai Lau Kok Garden featured an installation titled Colorful Prisms, created by the internationally renowned design duo Craig & Karl. Drawing inspiration from various aspects of Tsuen Wan, Craig & Karl designed the work in harmony with the topography of Sai Lau Kok Garden. The installation features brightly colored rectangular forms stacked like building blocks, with even the ground painted in vivid hues. The artwork was intended to celebrate the coexistence of Tsuen Wan’s diverse cultural and urban characteristics, while also bringing energy and vibrancy to the formerly understated garden space. Craig, who is based in the United States, expressed hope that visitors would interact directly with the installation and experience the art firsthand.

However, some members of the public reported being shouted at and told to leave by security guards after sitting on the installation. According to these reports, the guards warned that if the artwork was damaged, individuals would be held financially responsible. In response, the designers, organizers, and the Leisure and Cultural Services Department clarified that the artwork was not fragile. They reiterated that the public was welcome to touch and interact with the piece freely, as long as basic public safety and courtesy were observed.
