= CDW (disambiguation) =

CDW is an American technology corporation.

CDW may also refer to:

- CDW Building, Tsuen Wan, Hong Kong, China
- Charge density wave, in quantum physics
- Collision damage waiver, car rental insurance
- Concord West railway station, Sydney, Australia (by Sydney Trains station code)
- Congregation for Divine Worship, a former name of the Dicastery for Divine Worship and the Discipline of the Sacraments
- Essex County Airport, New Jersey, U.S. (by IATA code)
- Civil danger warning, a specific area message encoding code in the United States
- Circumpolar deep water, a deep water mass in the Pacific and Indian Oceans
