= Chelsea Court =

Housing estate in Tsuen Wan, Hong Kong

Coordinates: 22.36671°N 114.11699°E

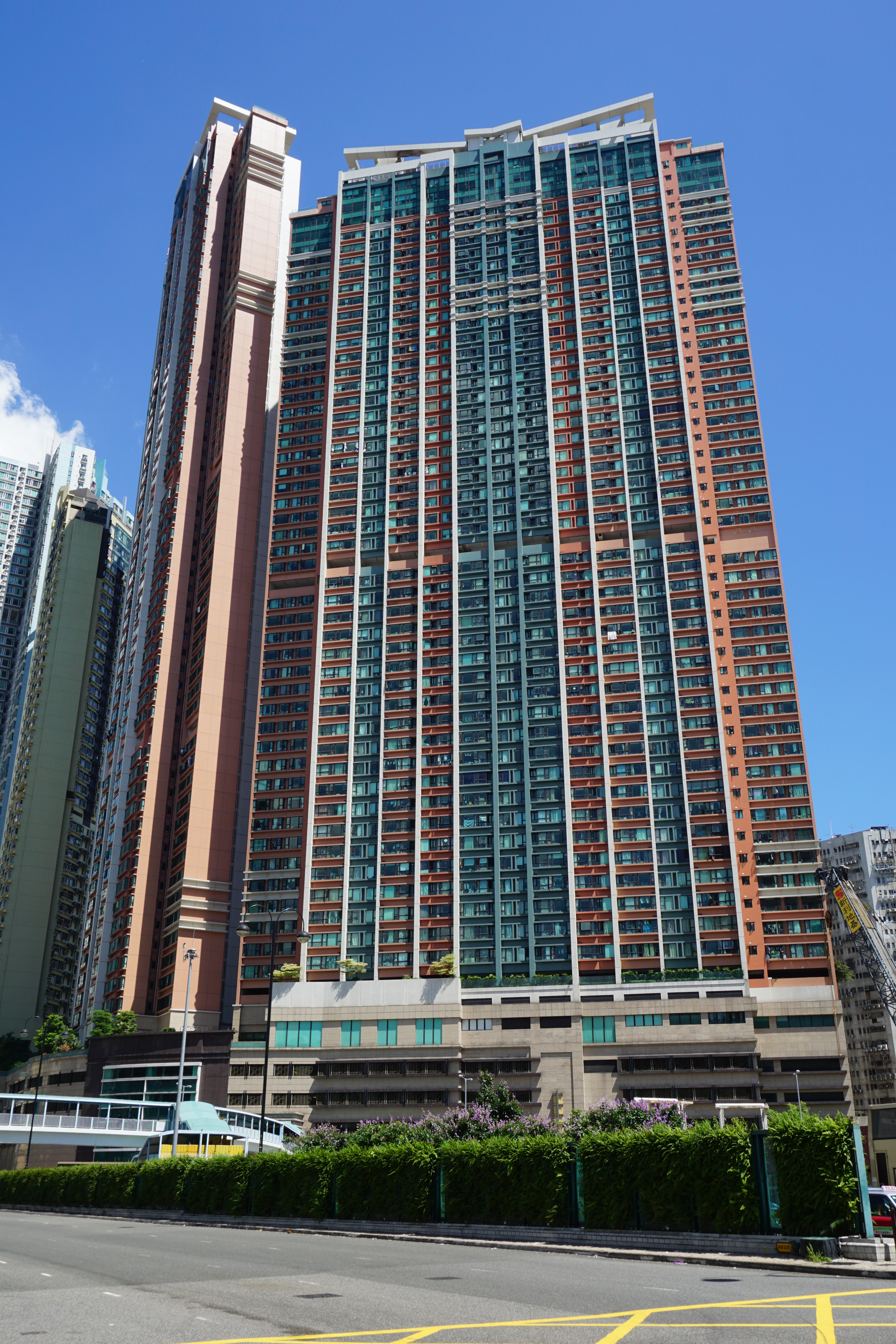
Chelsea Court

Chelsea Court (Chinese: 爵悅庭) is a private housing estate in Yeung Uk Road, Tsuen Wan, New Territories, Hong Kong, which was developed by Sun Hung Kai Properties in 2005. Formerly Swire Cola Factory, it has two towers of 45 and 54 floors, offering 1,624 serviced apartments, overlooking the Tai Mo Shan and Rambler Channel.

Like nearby Nina Tower, Vision City and Indi Home, Chelsea Court is a high-rise building estate.

== Demographics ==
According to the 2016 by-census, Chelsea Court had a population of 4,273. The median age was 36.4 and the majority of residents (91.6 per cent) were of Chinese ethnicity. The average household size was 2.8 people. The median monthly household income of all households (i.e. including both economically active and inactive households) was HK$50,000.

== Politics ==
Chelsea Court is located in the Tsuen Wan South constituency of the Tsuen Wan District Council. It is currently represented by Antonio Luk Ling-Chung, who was elected in the 2019 elections.

== See also ==
- Nina Tower
- Vision City
- Indi Home
