= Vanished Archives =

2017 Hong Kong documentary by Connie Lo

- Chinese: 消失的檔案
- Directed by: Connie Lo Yan-wai
- Release date: 2017
- Running time: 119 minutes
- Country: Hong Kong
- Language: Cantonese

Vanished Archives is a 2017 Hong Kong documentary film directed by Connie Lo Yan-wai. The documentary explores the 1967 Hong Kong riots in Hong Kong, a crucial yet controversial event in the city's history. Through a four-year process of interviews and archival research, Lo aimed to reconstruct the events, offering perspectives from various individuals who witnessed or participated in the riots. The film highlights the disappearance of official records related to the event and questions the implications of historical erasure on contemporary Hong Kong society.

== Background ==
The 1967 riots were a significant moment in Hong Kong’s history, often considered a turning point in the development of Hong Kong identity. However, official records of the event remain incomplete, with most original documents stored in the British National Archives, while only a 21-second fragment exists in Hong Kong Public Records Building.

== Production ==
Lo initially set out to create a documentary focusing on young offenders imprisoned during the riots. However, during her research, she uncovered a broader issue: the disappearance of historical records on the riots. This discovery led her to spend four years gathering material, interviewing former leftist leaders, bomb squad members, union representatives, patriotic students, police officers, journalists, and victims. Through these narratives, Vanished Archives pieces together a complex and multifaceted account of the events.

== Challenges ==
Despite its historical significance, Vanished Archives faced obstacles in reaching a wider audience. The Hong Kong International Film Festival declined to screen the documentary, citing reasons such as a lack of artistic merit and an unappealing voice-over. Lo challenged these claims, suggesting that political motivations might have influenced the decision.

The documentary also attracted negative attention from pro-Beijing media outlets, notably Ta Kung Pao, which accused the filmmakers of bias and political manipulation. Reports from the newspaper alleged that the documentary had ties to the pro-democracy Occupy movement and that it misrepresented interviewees' statements. These allegations led to confrontations at screening events, including an incident where a Ta Kung Pao reporter allegedly harassed the film’s production team, injuring a volunteer.

== Screenings and Reception ==
Due to the lack of mainstream distribution, Vanished Archives was primarily shown in small community venues and educational institutions such as the Hong Kong Journalists Association and the Chinese University of Hong Kong. The film was also screened in cities across the United States and Canada, expanding its reach beyond Hong Kong.

The documentary has been praised for its meticulous research and commitment to historical truth. It has sparked discussions about Hong Kong's archival policies and the importance of preserving historical records. The lack of an archival law in Hong Kong has led to criticisms of the government's handling of historical documents, with many calling for legal reforms to prevent the destruction of public records.
