= Citywalk, Hong Kong =

Shopping mall in Hong Kong

Coordinates: 22.37°N 114.114°E

City Walk 荃新天地

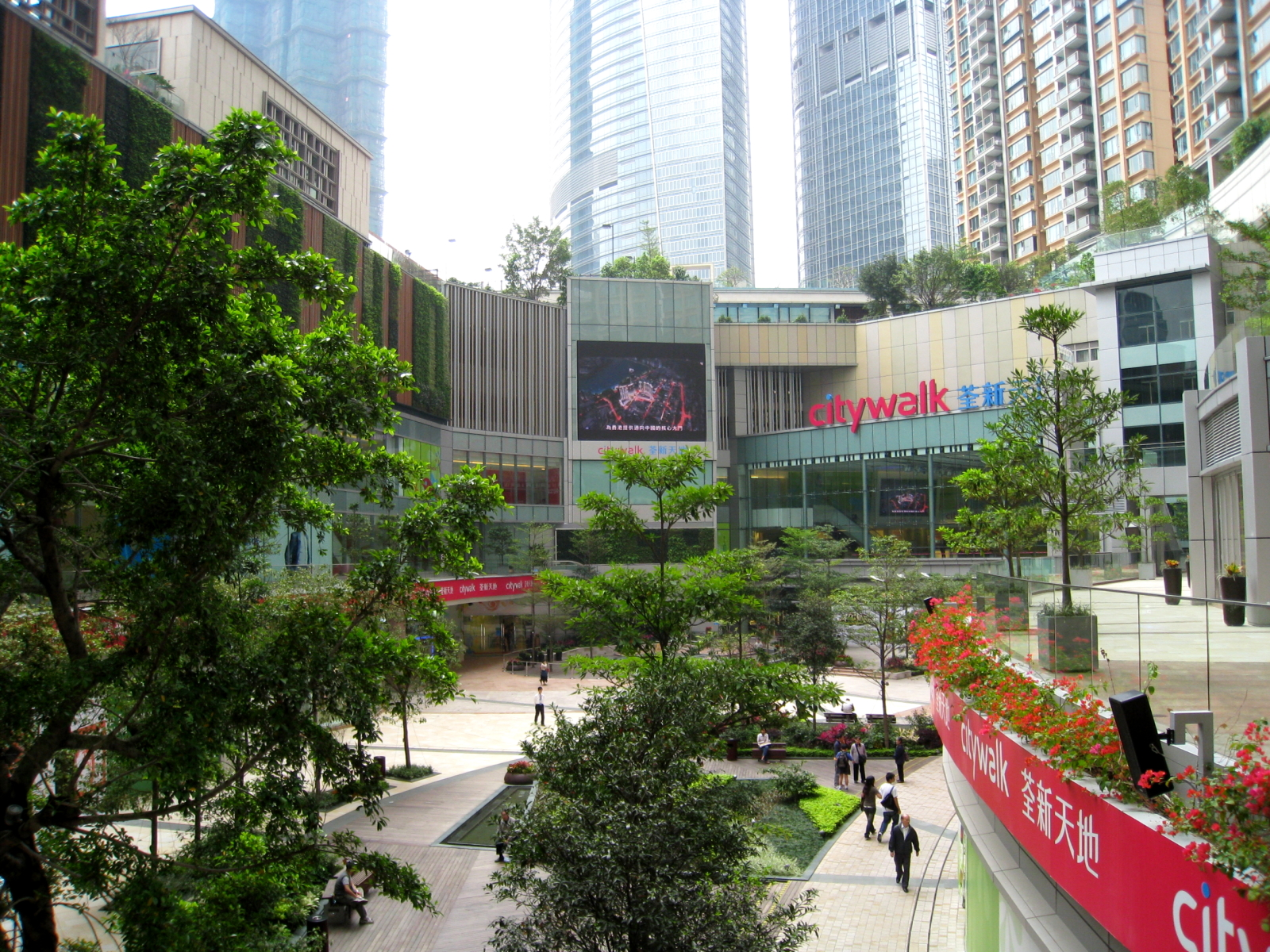
- City Walk 1
- Location: Tsuen Wan, New Territories, Hong Kong

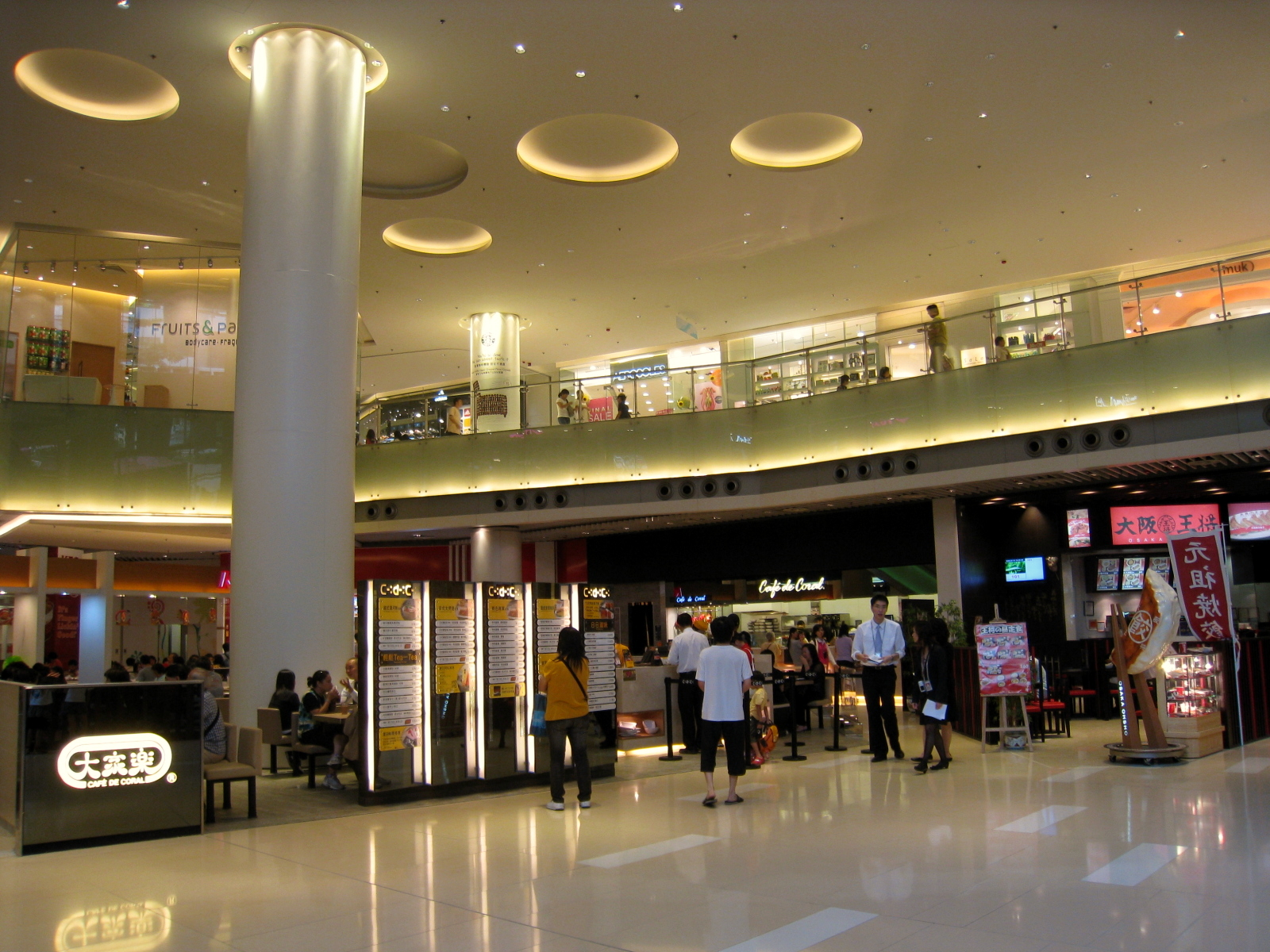
Food & Beverage Outlet on ground floor

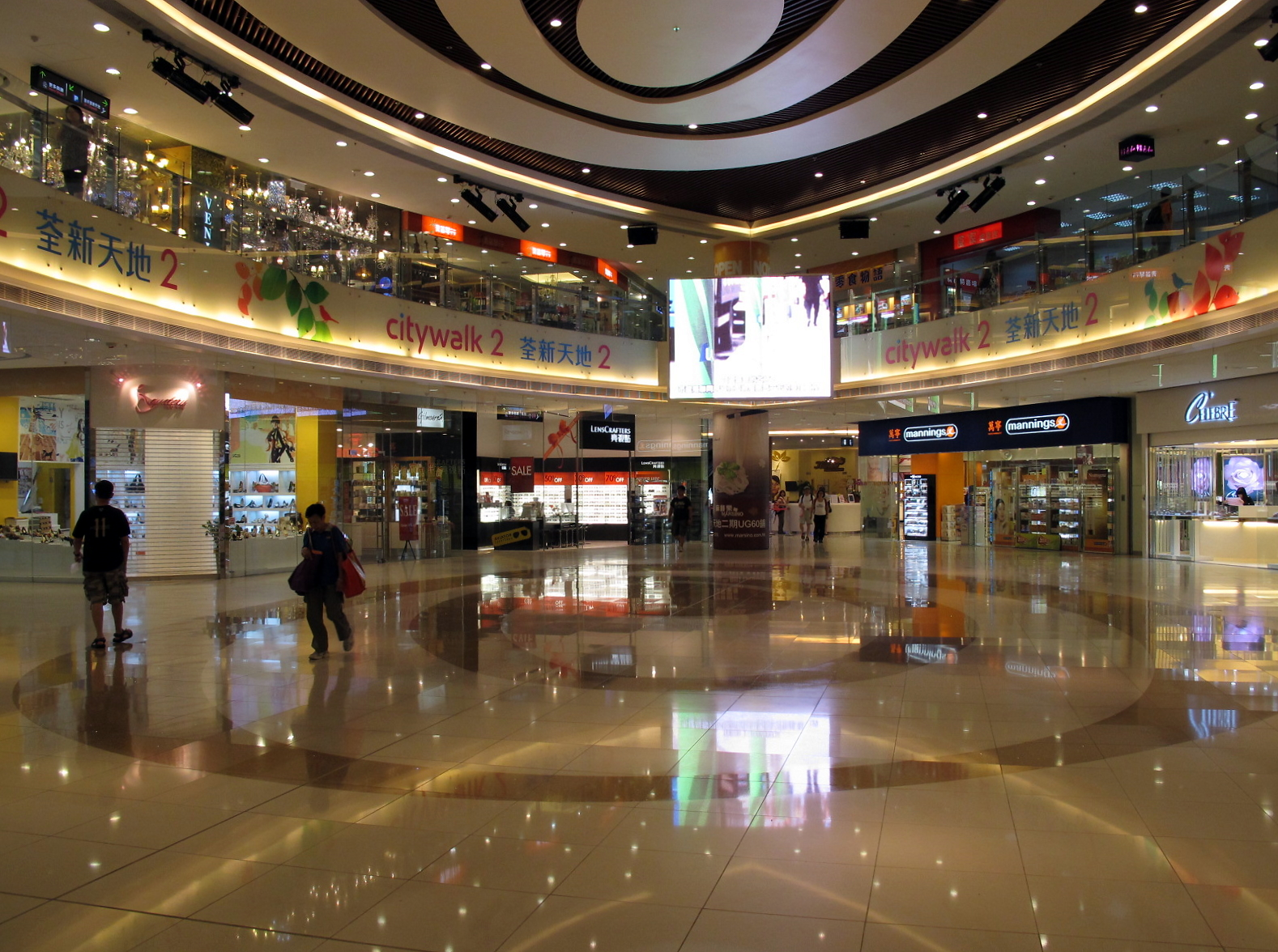
Citywalk Phase 2

City Walk (Chinese: 荃新天地) is one of the largest shopping centres in Tsuen Wan, New Territories, Hong Kong. It is located at Yeung Uk Road, beneath Vision City (Chinese: 萬景峰) and opposite to Nina Tower, one of the tallest buildings in Hong Kong. It was jointly developed by Sino Land and Urban Renewal Authority, and opened in December 2007.

The shopping mall offers shops on fashion, accessories, jewelry, lifestyle, food and beverage. It is the first "green" shopping mall in Hong Kong. It has "Citywalk Piazza" (Chinese: 花園廣場) and "Vertical Garden" (Chinese: 直立花園) at the centre of the mall, with landscaped water features and a hybrid chiller system to improve air quality and recycles waste water respectively.

== See also ==
- Vision City
