= Overseas Chinese Daily News =

Chinese language newspaper in Malaysia

Overseas Chinese Daily News 华侨日报
- Type: Daily newspaper
- Format: Broadsheet
- Owner: Sabah Publishing House Sdn. Bhd.
- Founded: 1936
- Language: Mandarin Chinese
- Headquarters: Kota Kinabalu, Malaysia
- Price: MYR1.20
- Website: www.ocdn.com.my

Overseas Chinese Daily News (OCDN; Chinese: 华侨日报; pinyin: Huáqiáo Rìbào) is a Chinese language newspaper in Malaysia and is one of two newspapers published by Sabah Bernam Publishing House, with the other being the English-language Daily Express.

== History ==
Its first newsprint hit the streets of Kota Kinabalu (was known as Jesselton then) on 1 March 1936, when it was first distributed as a four-page mimeographed newspaper. It was the first daily in Sabah (was known as North Borneo then). It stopped publication during World War II when the Japanese army invaded North Borneo and continued publication afterwards.

The late Tan Sri Yeh Pao Tzu took over the paper in 1949, and served as its publisher cum chief editor. He was a graduate in Journalism from Fu Tan University, China. Yeh died in 1987 and his wife succeeded him as the Chairman. His son, Clement Yeh Chang became the publisher.
