= Nan Fung Centre =

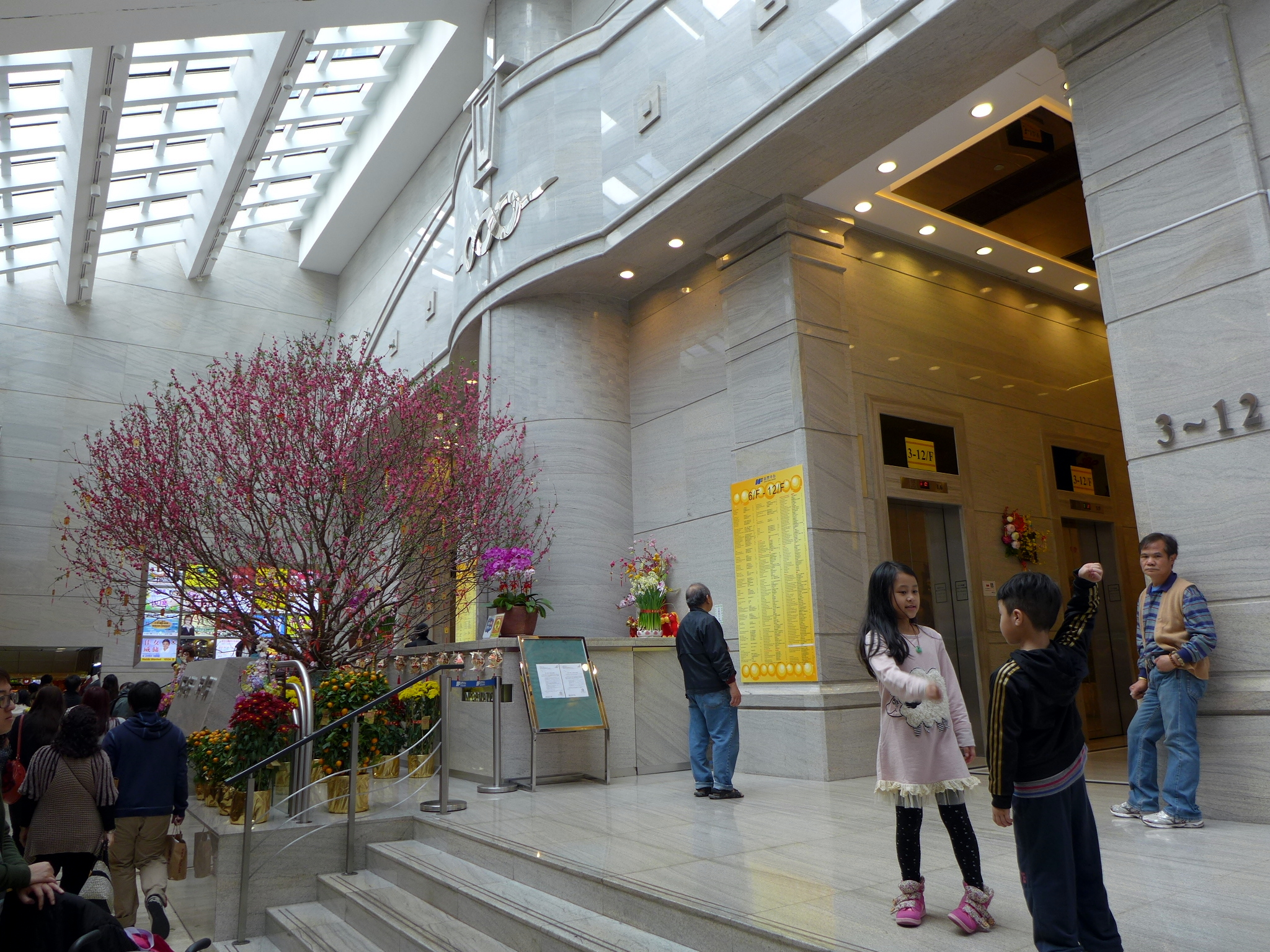
- Office Lobby of Nan Fung Centre in February 2014
- Location: Tsuen Wan, Tsuen Wan District, New Territories, Hong Kong
- Coordinates: 22°22′25″N 114°06′58″E
- Address: 264-298 Castle Peak Road – Tsuen Wan
- Opened: 1983; 43 years ago
- Developer: Nan Fung Group

Nan Fung Centre (Chinese: 南豐中心) is a commercial and shopping centre in Castle Peak Road, Tsuen Wan, New Territories, Hong Kong, located nearby the MTR Tsuen Wan station and a bus terminus at its ground floor. It was developed by Nan Fung Group in 1983 and it is one of the earliest large-scale commercial centres in the district.

== Site history ==
The site occupied by Nan Fung Centre was previously the site of the Yau Kom Tau Village. Established in 1864, the village was resited to the Yau Kom Tau area in 1984, following the development of the MTR.

== New Town Mall ==
New Town Mall is located on the 2-3 floors of the Nan Fung Centre. Shops and restaurants in New Town Mall include ViVi Shop, McDonald's, KFC and Café de Coral.

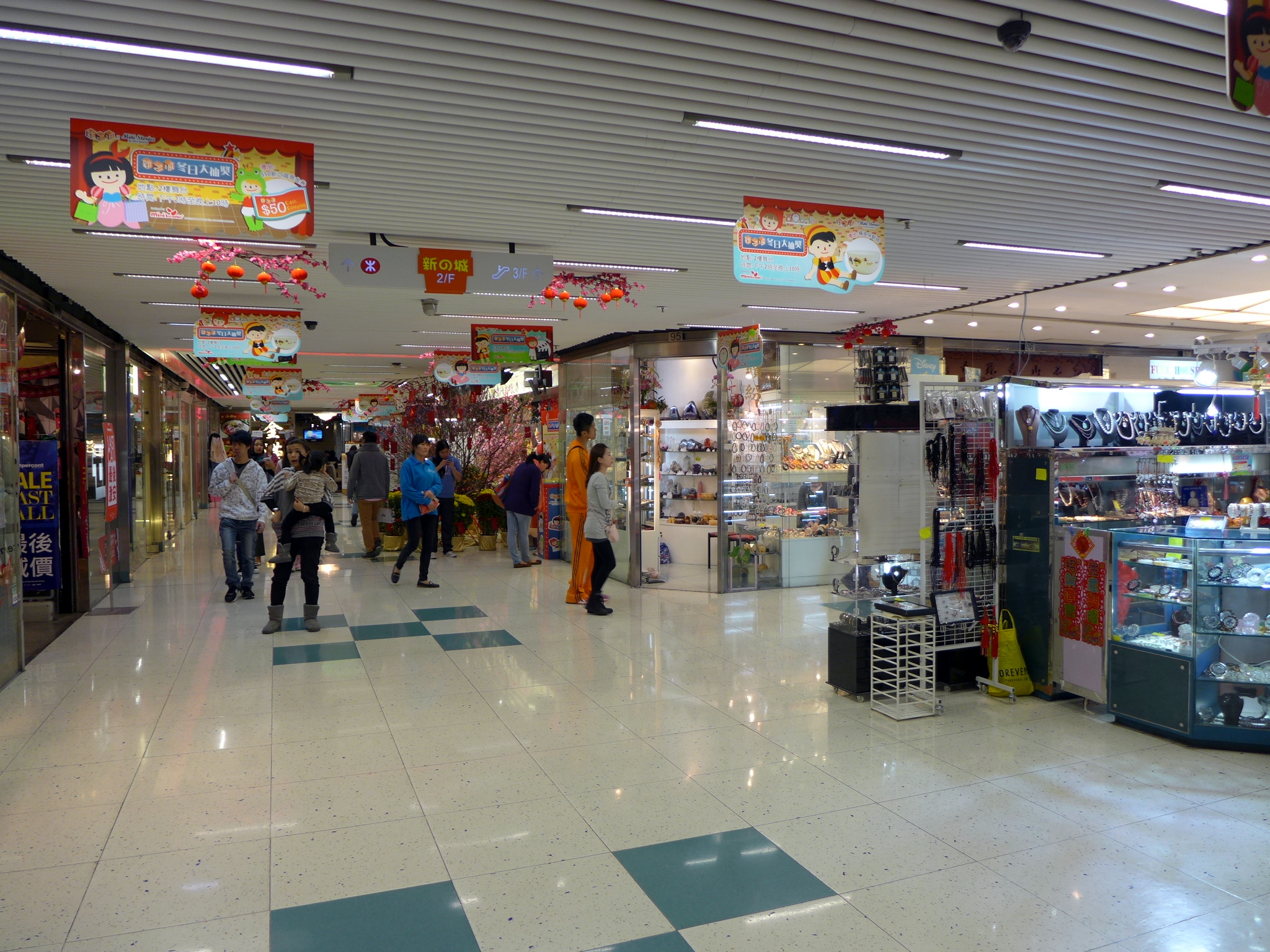
New Town Mall in February 2014

== See also ==
- The Mills, Hong Kong
