= Indi Home =

Building in Tsuen Wan, New Territories

Coordinates: 22.36618°N 114.11825°E

- 樂悠居
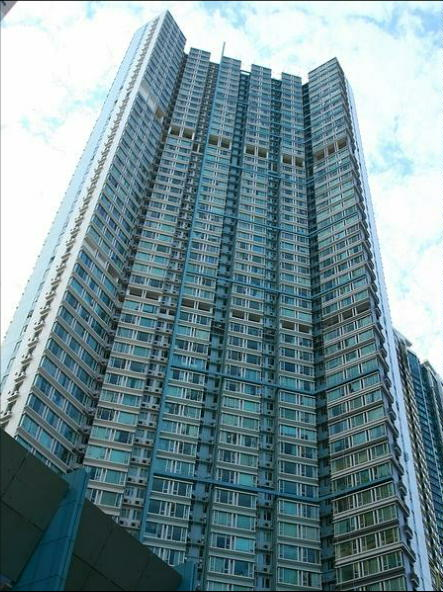
- Interactive map of the Indi Home area

General information
- Location: 138 Yeung Uk Road, Tsuen Wan, Hong Kong
- Construction started: 2002; 24 years ago
- Completed: 2005; 21 years ago
- Opening: 17 September 2005; 20 years ago

Height
- Roof: 212 m (696 ft)

Technical details
- Floor count: 56
- Floor area: 54,000 m^{2} (580,000 sq ft)

Design and construction
- Architect: Kwong Sang Hong Limited

Indi Home (Chinese: 樂悠居; Jyutping: lok6 jau4 geoi1) is a skyscraper located in the Tsuen Wan district of the New Territories in Hong Kong. The tower rises 56 floors and 212 metres (696 ft) in height. The building was completed in 2005. It was developed by Chinese Estates Groups under the name of its subsidiary Kwong Sang Hong Limited. IndiHome, which stands as the joint 45th-tallest building in Hong Kong, is composed almost entirely of residential units, of which there are 950; the lower floors also have retailing space. The structure has a total floor area of 54,000 square metres (580,000 sq ft).

== Politics ==
Indi Home is located in Tsuen Wan South constituency of the Tsuen Wan District Council. It is currently represented by Antonio Luk Ling-chung, who was elected in the 2019 elections.

== See also ==
- List of tallest buildings in Hong Kong
