= CDW Building =

Building in Tsuen Wan, Hong Kong

Coordinates: 22.37535°N 114.11312°E

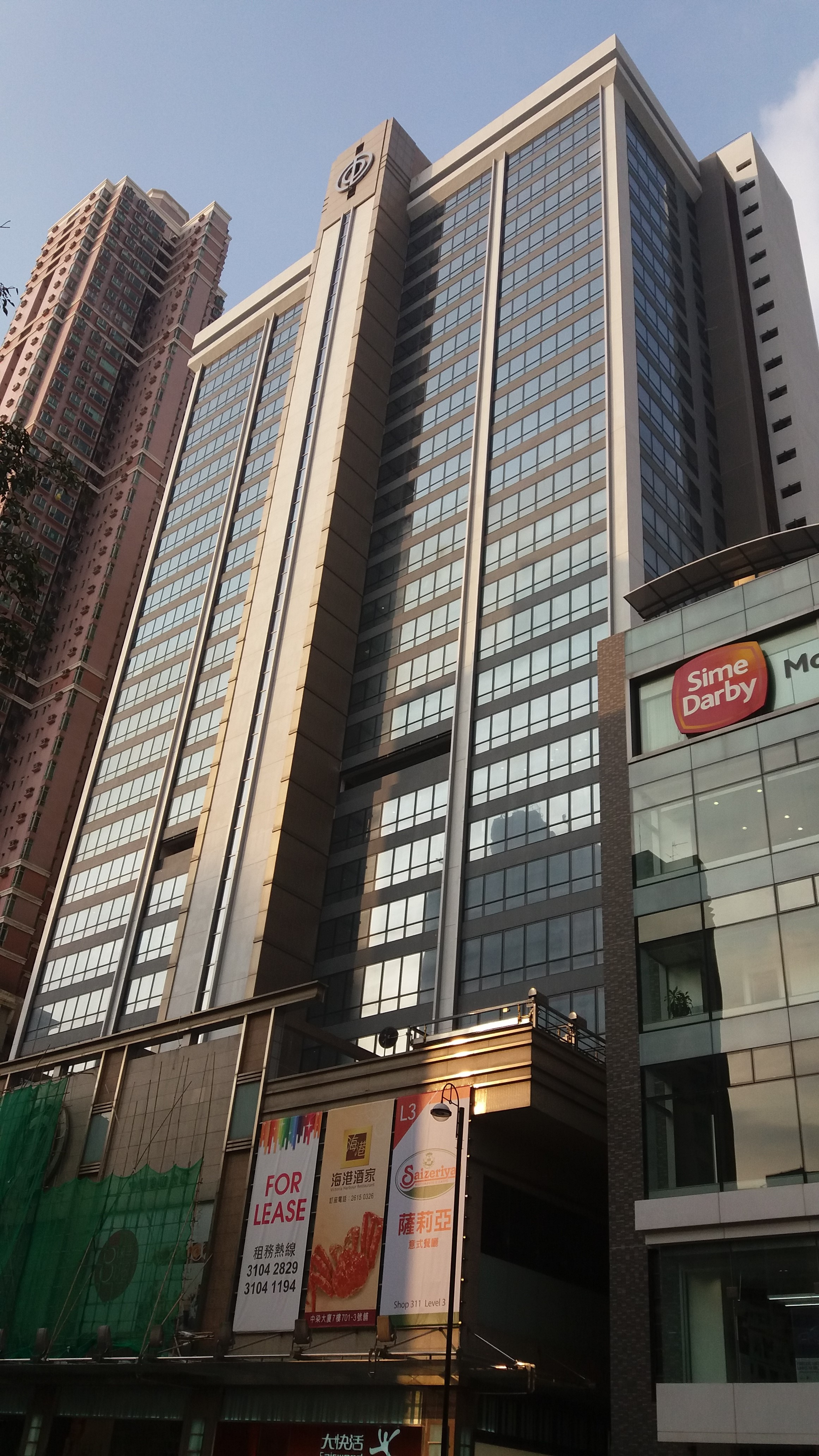
China Dyeing Works Building

CDW Building (Chinese: 中染大廈), formerly known as China Dyeing Works Building, is located at 388 Castle Peak Road, Tsuen Wan, Hong Kong, and is wholly owned by HKR International Ltd. It was built in 1982 as an industrial building. Across the years, CDW Building underwent a number of refurbishment works. At present, the building comprises an office tower and a shopping mall named 8½ shopping mall, with total GFA of approximately 90,600 square metres.

== Shopping centre (8½) ==
8½
- 8咪半

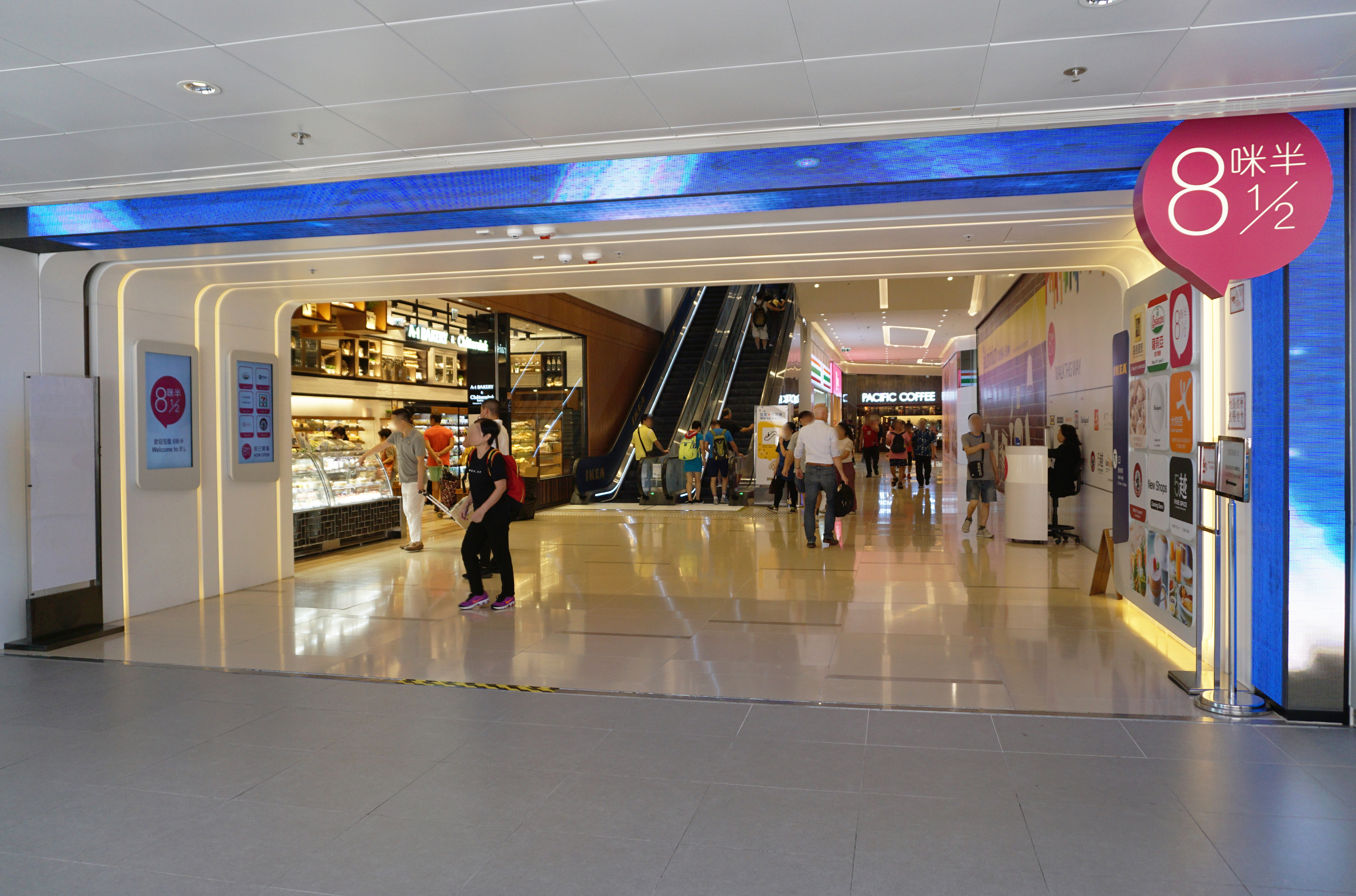
- Interactive map of the 8½ area
- Former names: China Dyeing Works Place; CDW Place

Website
- https://www.eightandahalf.com.hk

When Castle Peak Road was built in the early 20th century, addresses were marked in miles from a theoretical origin point, namely the Tsim Sha Tsui Ferry Pier. Some addresses along the road (particularly in the rural areas) still comprise the nearest milepost. The China Dyeing Works Building, located on Castle Peak Road, is about 8½ miles from the pier, hence the name of the shopping mall.

On 11 October 2017, IKEA opened its fourth outlet in Hong Kong in 8½, formerly known as China Dyeing Works Place and CDW Place. Occupying 4 storeys and with a retail space of 90,000 square feet, IKEA is the key tenant of the mall.

Other tenants include Colleague Music Restaurant, 5 Spice, Physical Fitness etc.

== Transport ==
The Building provides 185 car parking spaces and is connected to Tsuen Wan MTR station with an air-conditioned indoor walkway. Bus terminus and cross-border coach station are also in close proximity.
