= Vision City =

Vision City may refer to:

- Vision City (Hong Kong), a high-rise development in the Tsuen Wan district of the Hong Kong's New Territories
- Vision City (Rwanda), a housing development in the Rwandan capital, Kigali
- Quill City, formerly Vision City, a partially completed integrated development project in Kuala Lumpur, Malaysia.
