= List of tallest buildings in Hong Kong =

Tall buildings in Hong Kong
- Hong Kong from the Peak
- Tallest building: International Commerce Centre
- Tallest building height: 484 m (1,588 ft)
- First 150 m+ building: Jardine House (1973)

Number of tall buildings
- Taller than 150 m (492 ft): 569 (1st)
- Taller than 200 m (656 ft): 102 (3rd)
- Taller than 300 m (984 ft): 6 (9th)
- Taller than 400 m (1,312 ft): 2

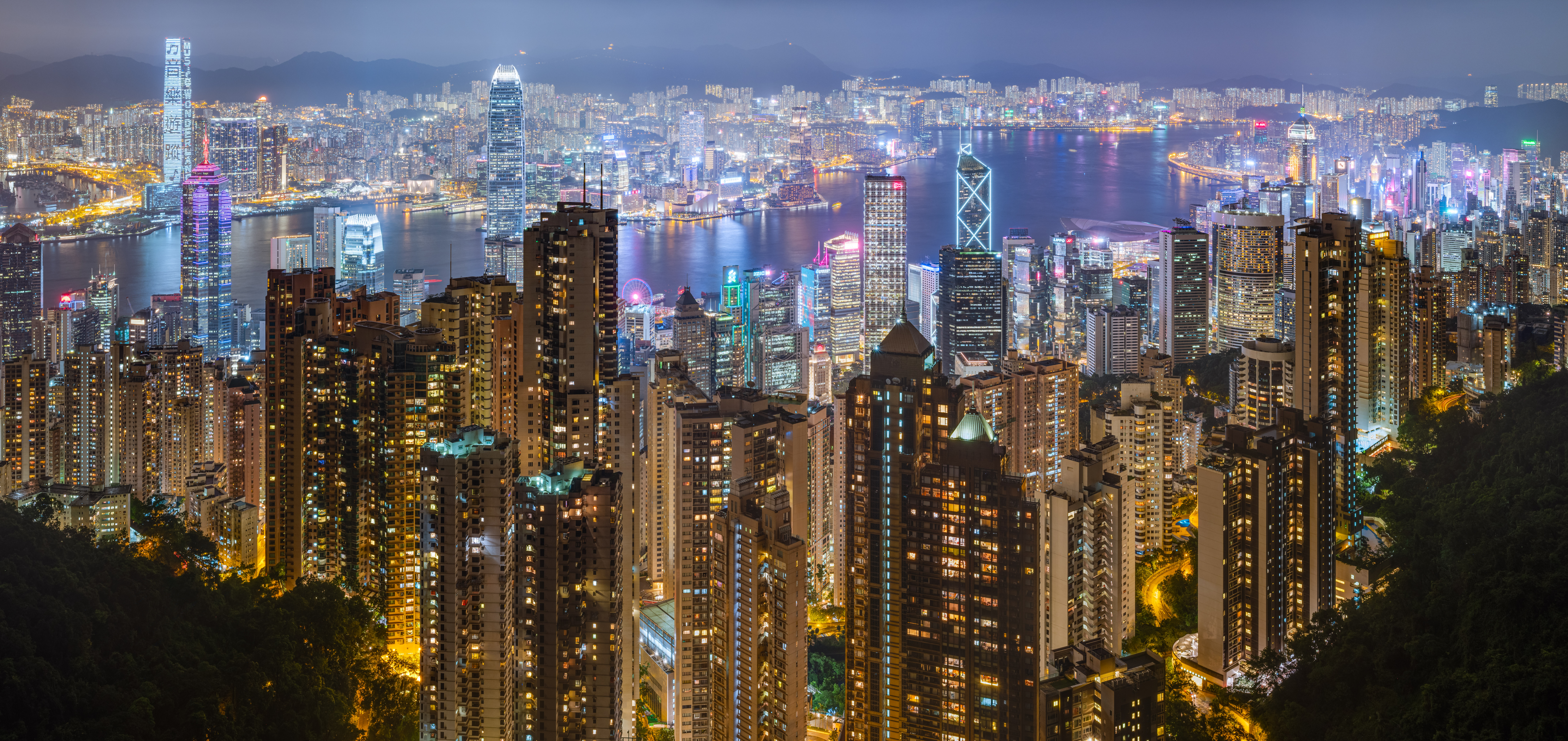
Victoria Harbour and the Hong Kong skyline at night, taken in June 2019

Hong Kong has over 9,000 high-rise buildings, of which over 1,000 are skyscrapers standing taller than 100 m (328 ft) with 567 buildings above 150 m (492 ft) as of 2025, according to the Council on Tall Buildings and Urban Habitat.^{[A]} The tallest building in Hong Kong is the 108-storey International Commerce Centre, which stands 484 m (1,588 ft) and is the 13th tallest building in the world. The total built-up height (combined heights) of these skyscrapers is approximately 333.8 km (207 miles), making Hong Kong the world's tallest urban agglomeration. Furthermore, reflective of the city's high population densities, Hong Kong has more inhabitants living at the 15th floor or higher, and more buildings of at least 100 m (328 ft) and 150 m (492 ft) height, than any other city in the world.

Most of Hong Kong's buildings are concentrated on the northern shore of Hong Kong Island, Kowloon, and the new towns (satellite towns) of the New Territories, such as Tsuen Wan and Sha Tin. Additional high-rises are located along Hong Kong Island's southern shoreline and areas near the stations of the Mass Transit Railway (MTR).

The skyline of Hong Kong Island is famed for its unique arrangement, with surrounding mountains and Victoria Harbour complementing the rows of skyscrapers along the shore. Each evening, 44 buildings on the shores of Victoria Harbour participate in A Symphony of Lights, a synchronised show named by the Guinness Book of World Records as the largest permanent light fixture in the world.

== History ==
The first high-rise in Hong Kong was the Hong Kong & Shanghai Bank, completed in 1935. The building stood 70 m (230 ft) tall with 13 floors and was in use for five decades before being demolished for the construction of the HSBC Main Building. High-rise construction was limited in the early part of the 20th century. However, beginning in the 1970s, Hong Kong experienced a general trend of high-rise building construction that has continued to the present. This trend is in large part a result of the city's rugged, mountainous terrain and lack of flat land. The city entered a construction boom in 1980, which lasted roughly until 1993. Among the buildings built during these years are Hopewell Centre (1980), Bank of China Tower (1990), and Central Plaza (1992), three of the territory's tallest buildings upon their respective dates of completion.

Beginning in 1998, Hong Kong entered a second, much larger building boom that lasted until the early 2010s. The second boom saw the completion of the International Commerce Centre (ICC), Two International Finance Centre, Nina Tower I, and One Island East. At the height of the construction boom in 2003, 56 skyscrapers over 150 m (492 ft) were completed throughout the city. The proliferation of multi-tower, high-rise building complexes, such as public housing estates and transit-oriented developments near MTR stations (known as rail + property development), greatly increased the number of skyscrapers.

Unlike previous building trends of the 1980s and early 1990s, many high-rise buildings of the second boom were for residential use due to a surge in demand for luxury housing properties in Hong Kong. In addition, the closure of the Kai Tak Airport and the relaxation of height restrictions on the Kowloon Peninsula allowed many tall skyscrapers to rise in Kowloon, such as The Masterpiece, Victoria Dockside and The Cullinan, all of which exceed 200 m (656 ft). Skyscrapers also grew in the New Territories, such as the developments of Metro Town and LOHAS Park in Tseung Kwan O. However, proposals for large scale building projects slowed down considerably over the 2000s. There has been an increasing community awareness of the effects of skyscrapers on urban ecology, such as changes to air circulation (dubbed the "wall effect") and air pollution. No new supertall skyscrapers were built for over a decade after the completion of the ICC in 2010. The Mong Kok East Station Redevelopment, currently under construction in Mong Kok, will be the first supertall building to be built in 18 years when it is complete in 2028.

The emergence of eastern Kowloon as a new business district have seen a commercial and residential skyscrapers around Kwun Tong and Kowloon Bay starting from the 2000s, such as the Millennium City development. Additionally, the Kai Tak development has led to the construction of residential complexes on the former airport during the 2020s.

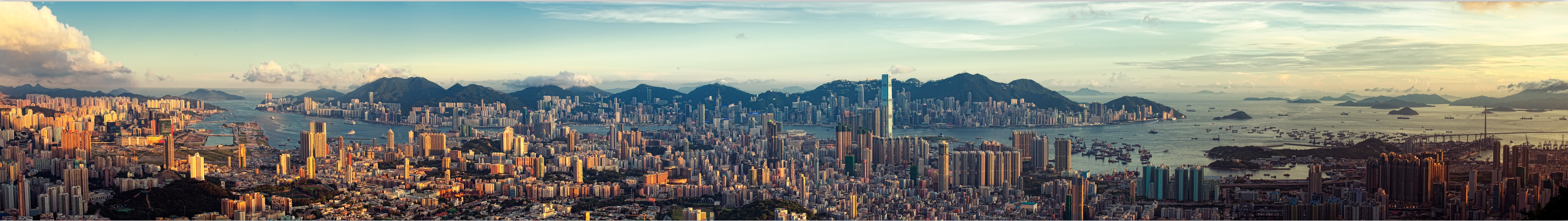
Panoramic view of the Kowloon Peninsula skyline with Hong Kong Island in the background.

== Notable buildings ==
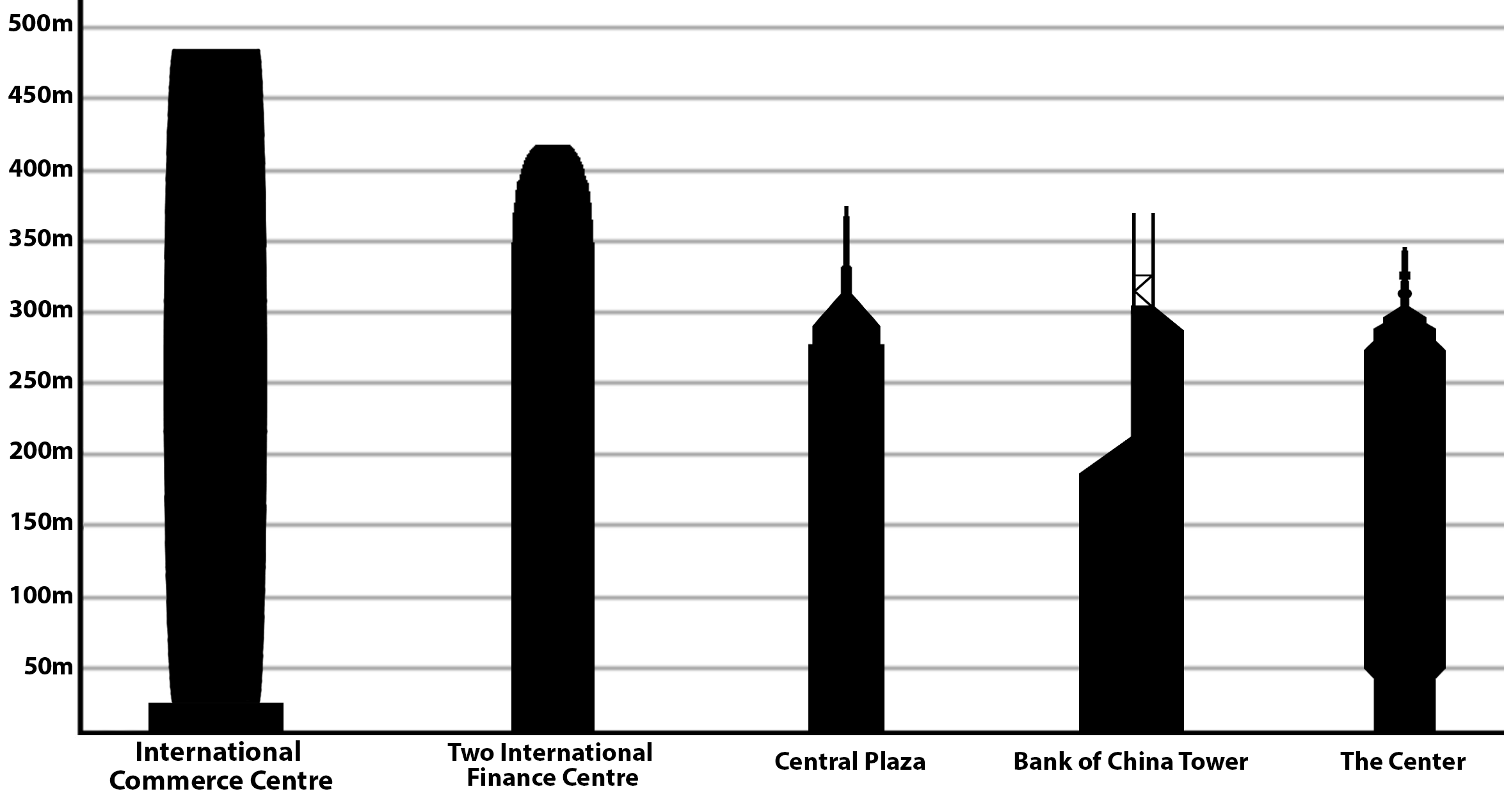
Tallest buildings in Hong Kong, by pinnacle height

- International Commerce Centre (abbreviated ICC), located at 1 Austin Road, West Kowloon. It is owned and jointly developed by MTR Corporation Limited and Sun Hung Kai Properties as Phase 7 of the Union Square Development. Rising 484 m (1,588 ft), the ICC is the tallest building in Hong Kong as well as the 13th tallest building in the world. Notable tenants include Deutsche Bank, Credit Suisse, Morgan Stanley, ABN-AMRO and Accenture.
- Two International Finance Centre (abbreviated 2IFC), located above the MTR Hong Kong station at 8 Finance Street, Central. The 2IFC is currently the second tallest building in Hong Kong at 415.8 m (1,364 ft) tall. It became the tallest building in Hong Kong upon its completion in 2003 until it was surpassed by the ICC in 2009. It was built as the second phase of the International Finance Centre commercial development. Notable tenants include UBS, Samsung Electronics, Hong Kong Monetary Authority and BNP Paribas.
- Central Plaza, located at 18 Harbour Road, Wan Chai. The Central Plaza is currently the third tallest building in Hong Kong at a pinnacle height of 373.9 m (1,227 ft). It was the tallest building in Hong Kong when it was built in 1992 until it was surpassed by 2IFC in 2003. The Central Plaza was also the tallest building in Asia from 1992 until 1996, surpassed by Shun Hing Square in Shenzhen. The building is notable for its unique exterior shape as well as its LIGHTIME lighting system. It also houses the world's highest church inside a skyscraper, Sky City Church.
- Bank of China Tower (abbreviated BOC Tower), located at 1 Garden Road, in Central. Designed by the Pritzker Prize-winning Chinese American architect I.M. Pei, the tower is 315 m (1,033 ft) high with two masts reaching 367.4 m (1,205 ft) high. It is currently the fourth tallest building in Hong Kong. It was the tallest building outside of the United States from 1990 to 1992, and was the first building outside of the United States to pass the 305 m (1,001 ft) mark. The exterior design of the building resembles bamboo shoots, symbolizing livelihood and prosperity in Feng Shui.
- Cheung Kong Center at 2 Queen's Road Central, Central. Standing 282.8 m (928 ft) tall and completed in 1999, this skyscraper is the headquarters of Cheung Kong Holdings. The building's top floor contains a private residence for Cheung Kong Holdings' billionaire Chairman Li Ka-Shing.
- The Center, located at 99 Queen's Road Central, Central. Completed in 1998 and standing 346 m (1,135 ft) tall, this building was one of the first large urban renewal projects undertaken by the Land Development Corporation (now the Urban Renewal Authority). The skyscraper's unique structure is entirely composed of steel and lacks a reinforced concrete core.
- Hopewell Centre, located at 183 Queen's Road East, Wanchai. At 222 m (728 ft) tall, the Hopewell Centre was the tallest building in Hong Kong when it was completed in 1980. The building signifies the eastern expansion of Hong Kong's central business district. The Hopewell Centre has a unique cylindrical shaped design with a revolving restaurant on the 62nd level of the building. Designed by Sir Gordon Wu, chairman of Hopewell Holdings, the building serves as the headquarters of his company.
- HSBC Main Building (also known as HSBC Tower), located at 1 Queen's Road Central, Central. The building, standing 178.8 m (587 ft) tall, is the headquarters of HSBC, and is the fourth generation of their headquarters. Designed by the famed British architect Norman Foster, the building took seven years to complete, and is noted as being the most expensive building in the world at completion at HK$5.2 billion (US$668 million) in 1985. Together with Statue Square, the building also serves as a gathering place for thousands of Filipino domestic workers during weekends and holidays.
- Jardine House (originally called Connaught Centre^{[B]}), located at 1 Connaught Place, Central. Upon completion in 1973, the 178.5 m (586 ft)-tall skyscraper was the tallest building in Hong Kong and Asia. The building features round windows, as opposed to traditional rectangular windows, for a stronger curtain wall and thinner structural frame. These round windows also earned the building a nickname of "The House of a Thousand Arseholes."
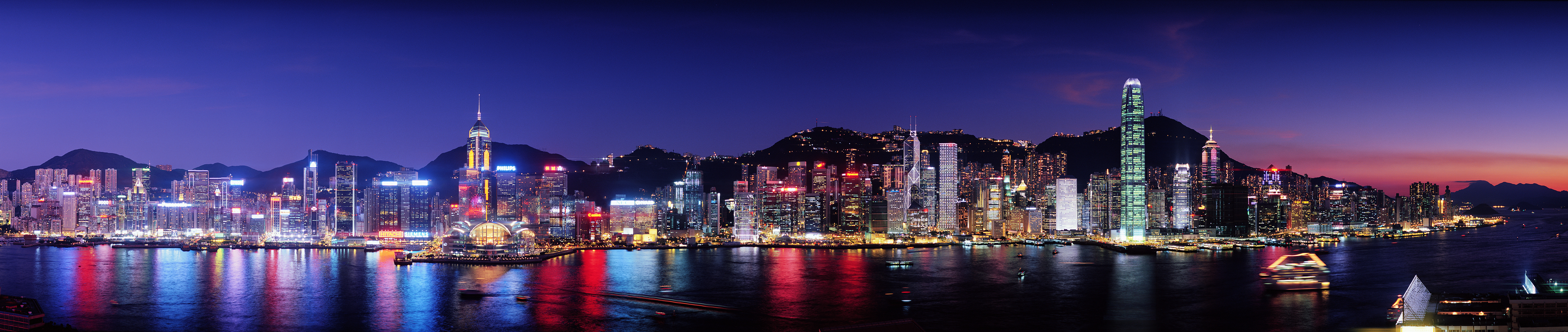
Hong Kong Island, viewed from Victoria Harbour waterfront.

== Tallest buildings ==
This lists ranks Hong Kong skyscrapers that stand at least 180 m (591 ft) tall, based on standard height measurement. This includes spires and architectural details but does not include antenna masts. The "Year" column indicates the year in which a building was completed.

Was the tallest building in Hong Kong upon completion
Indicates buildings still under construction that have been architecturally topped out but not yet fully opened

| Rank | Name^{[C]} | Image | Height^{[D]} m (ft) | Floors^{[D]}^{[E]} | Use | Year | Coordinates | Notes |
|---|---|---|---|---|---|---|---|---|
| 1 | International Commerce Centre | | 484 (1,588) | 108 | Hotel, Office | 2010 | 22°18′12.21″N 114°09′36.61″E | 13th-tallest building in the world.; Tallest building in Hong Kong since 2010; tallest building completed in the 2010s.; World's highest Hotel from 2011 to 2020: The Ritz-Carlton, Hong Kong |
| 2 | Two International Finance Centre | | 412 (1,352) | 88 | Office | 2003 | 22°17′07.09″N 114°09′33.37″E | 38th-tallest building in the world.; Tallest building in Hong Kong from 2003 to 2010. Remains tallest building on Hong Kong Island.; Tallest building completed in the 2000s. |
| 3 | Central Plaza | | 374 (1,227) | 78 | Office | 1992 | 22°16′48.00″N 114°10′25.00″E | Tallest building in the world outside of the United States from 1992 to 1996.; World's tallest reinforced concrete building until the completion of CITIC Plaza in 1997.; Tallest building completed in the 1990s.; Houses the highest church in the world. |
| 4 | Bank of China Tower | | 367 (1,205) | 70 | Office | 1990 | 22°16′45.00″N 114°09′41.00″E | First building outside of the United States to rise taller than 305 m (1,001 ft) in height.; Stood as the tallest building in the world outside of Chicago and New York City upon completion. |
| 5 | The Center | | 346 (1,135) | 73 | Office | 1998 | 22°17′05.00″N 114°09′16.00″E | |
| 6 | Nina Tower | | 320 (1,050) | 80 | Hotel, Office | 2007 | 22°22′07.00″N 114°06′47.00″E | Tallest building in the New Territories. |
| 7 | One Island East | | 298 (978) | 68 | Office | 2008 | 22°17′09.80″N 114°12′48.10″E | |
| 8 | Victoria Dockside | | 284 (931) | 65 | Hotel, Office | 2017 | 22°17′41.72″N 114°10′32.84″E | This project contains Rosewood Hotels & Resorts. |
| 9 | Cheung Kong Centre | | 283 (928) | 63 | Office | 1999 | 22°16′46.00″N 114°09′37.00″E | |
| 10 | The Cullinan North Tower | | 270 (886) | 68 | Residential | 2008 | 22°18′20.84″N 114°09′39.28″E | Tallest completed all-residential building in Hong Kong. |
| 10 | The Cullinan South Tower | | 270 (886) | 68 | Hotel, Residential | 2008 | 22°18′17.40″N 114°09′38.26″E | |
| 12 | The Masterpiece | | 261 (856) | 64 | Hotel, Residential | 2008 | 22°17′51.00″N 114°10′26.00″E | This building is also known as the Hanoi Road Redevelopment. |
| 13 | Sorrento 1 | | 256 (841) | 75 | Residential | 2003 | 22°18′24.24″N 114°09′40.92″E | |
| 14 | Langham Place Office Tower | | 255 (837) | 59 | Office | 2004 | 22°19′07.81″N 114°10′06.49″E | |
| 15 | Highcliff | | 252 (828) | 73 | Residential | 2003 | 22°15′54.00″N 114°11′03.00″E | Locally referred to as "The Chopsticks" due to an extremely slender profile. |
| 16 | The Harbourside | | 251 (824) | 74 | Residential | 2004 | 22°18′11.05″N 114°09′41.40″E | |
| 17 | Manulife Plaza | | 240 (788) | 52 | Office | 1998 | 22°16′42.00″N 114°11′04.60″E | |
| 18 | Sorrento 2 | | 236 (773) | 66 | Residential | 2003 | 22°18′23.97″N 114°09′42.55″E | |
| 19 | The Hermitage 1–3 | The_Hermitage_(Hong_Kong) | 234 (767) | 62 | Residential | 2011 | 22°19′03.66″N 114°09′54.22″E | |
| 20 | The Harbourfront Landmark | | 233 (763) | 67 | Residential | 2001 | 22°18′12.00″N 114°11′35.00″E | |
| 21 | The Arch | | 231 (758) | 65 | Residential | 2005 | 22°18′12.24″N 114°09′46.73″E | |
| 22 | LOHAS Park Phase 5A Malibu Tower 1 | | 229 (751) | 66 | Residential | 2019 | 22°17′46.80″N 114°16′03.93″E | |
| 23 | One Taikoo Place | | 229 (750) | 48 | Office | 2018 | 22°17′14.78″N 114°12′46.06″E | This project is also known as Taikoo Place Redevelopment Phase 2A Building. |
| 24 | Cosco Tower | | 228 (748) | 53 | Office | 1998 | 22°17′07.55″N 114°09′11.12″E | |
| 25 | LOHAS Park Phase 5A Malibu Tower 2 | | 227 (745) | 65 | Residential | 2019 | 22°17′46.97″N 114°16′05.59″E | |
| 26 | The Belcher's Tower 5 | | 227 (744) | 61 | Residential | 2001 | 22°17′06.28″N 114°08′01.35″E | |
| 26 | The Belcher's Tower 6 | | 227 (744) | 61 | Residential | 2001 | 22°17′07.77″N 114°08′00.34″E | |
| 28 | Hopewell Centre | | 222 (728) | 64 | Office | 1980 | 22°16′28.25″N 114°10′17.76″E | Tallest building completed in the 1980s. |
| 29 | The Belcher's Tower 1 | | 221 (724) | 63 | Residential | 2000 | 22°17′04.89″N 114°07′57.41″E | |
| 29 | The Belcher's Tower 2 | | 221 (724) | 63 | Residential | 2000 | 22°17′04.54″N 114°07′58.85″E | |
| 31 | Tregunter 3 | | 220 (721) | 66 | Residential | 1993 | 22°16′27.67″N 114°09′09.86″E | World's tallest residential building from 1993 to 2001. |
| 32 | The Summit | | 220 (721) | 65 | Residential | 2001 | 22°15′55.90″N 114°11′01.00″E | Locally referred to as "The Chopsticks" due to an extremely slender profile. |
| 33 | Grand Promenade 2–5 | | 219 (718) | 66 | Residential | 2005 | 22°17′06.85″N 114°13′28.42″E | |
| 34 | Sorrento 3 | | 218 (715) | 64 | Residential | 2003 | 22°18′23.06″N 114°09′44.93″E | |
| 35 | LOHAS Park Phase 5A Malibu Tower 3 | | 216 (709) | 62 | Residential | 2019 | 22°17′47.34″N 114°16′07.05″E | |
| 36 | Chelsea Court Tower North | | 215 (705) | 59 | Residential | 2005 | 22°21′59.87″N 114°07′02.15″E | |
| 36 | Chelsea Court Tower West | | 215 (705) | 59 | Residential | 2005 | 22°22′00.49″N 114°07′01.26″E | |
| 36 | LOHAS Park Phase 2B Le Prime Towers 6−8 | | 215 (705) | 66 | Residential | 2011 | 22°17′39.31″N 114°16′19.82″E | Each of the three interconnected buildings have different names for the left and right sides: Tower 6, (L): Oxford, (R): Primroses; Tower 7, (L): Vision, (R): Pink Orchard; Tower 8, (L): Sunshine, (R): Flora |
| 39 | Sun Hung Kai Centre | | 215 (704) | 56 | Office | 1981 | 22°16′48.80″N 114°10′37.01″E | |
| 40 | The Belcher's Tower 3 | | 214 (704) | 61 | Residential | 2001 | 22°17′04.91″N 114°08′01.98″E | |
| 40 | The Belcher's Tower 8 | | 214 (704) | 61 | Residential | 2001 | 22°17′08.98″N 114°07′59.75″E | |
| 42 | The Hermitage 6–8 | The_Hermitage_(Hong_Kong) | 214 (701) | 56 | Residential | 2011 | 22°19′03.57″N 114°09′50.30″E | |
| 43 | Island Shangri-La | | 213 (700) | 57 | Hotel | 1991 | 22°16′38.00″N 114°09′51.00″E | This building is the tallest completed all-hotel building in the city. |
| 44 | Victoria Towers 1 | | 213 (699) | 62 | Residential | 2003 | 22°18′07.67″N 114°10′05.46″E | |
| 44 | Victoria Towers 2 | | 213 (699) | 62 | Residential | 2003 | 22°18′08.89″N 114°10′06.34″E | |
| 44 | Victoria Towers 3 | | 213 (699) | 62 | Residential | 2003 | 22°18′09.70″N 114°10′07.62″E | |
| 44 | Shining Heights | | 213 (699) | 55 | Residential | 2009 | 22°19′31.19″N 114°09′44.52″E | |
| 48 | Sorrento 5 | | 212 (696) | 62 | Residential | 2003 | 22°18′22.57″N 114°09′46.18″E | |
| 48 | Indi Home | | 212 (696) | 56 | Residential | 2005 | 22°21′58.25″N 114°07′05.70″E | |
| 50 | LOHAS Park Phase 6 LP6 Towers 1–3, 5 | | 212 (695) | 63 | Residential | 2020 | 22°17′32.76″N 114°16′11.01″E | |
| 51 | One International Finance Centre | | 210 (689) | 38 | Office | 1998 | 22°17′06.52″N 114°09′24.68″E | |
| 51 | LOHAS Park Phase 1 The Capitol Tower 1 | | 210 (689) | 61 | Residential | 2009 | 22°17′42.86″N 114°16′17.25″E | The left side of this building is known as Banff Tower, while the right side is known as Florence Tower. |
| 51 | LOHAS Park Phase 1 The Capitol Tower 2 | | 210 (689) | 61 | Residential | 2009 | 22°17′44.41″N 114°16′17.78″E | The left side of this building is known as Lucerne Tower, while the right side is known as Madrid Tower. |
| 51 | LOHAS Park Phase 3A Hemera Tower 1 | | 210 (689) | 60 | Residential | 2014 | 22°17′47.72″N 114°16′09.82″E | This building is also known as Diamond Tower. |
| 51 | LOHAS Park Phase 3A Hemera Tower 2 | | 210 (689) | 60 | Residential | 2014 | 22°17′48.62″N 114°16′11.20″E | This building is also known as Emerald Tower. |
| 56 | Grand Promenade 1 | | 209 (686) | 63 | Residential | 2005 | 22°17′06.08″N 114°13′26.75″E | |
| 56 | Grand Promenade 6 | | 209 (686) | 63 | Residential | 2005 | 22°17′05.93″N 114°13′30.34″E | |
| 58 | MetroPlaza Tower 2 | | 209 (685) | 47 | Office | 1992 | 22°21′26.95″N 114°07′34.83″E | |
| 58 | LOHAS Park Phase 2C Le Splendeur Towers 9–11 | | 209 (685) | 63 | Residential | 2012 | 22°17′41.05″N 114°16′23.08″E: Each of the three interconnected buildings have different names for the left and right sides: Tower 9, (L): Almond Blossom, (R): Bouquet; Tower 10, (L): Flamingos, (R): Irises; Tower 11, (L): Meadowland, (R): Morning Haze | |
| 60 | The Pavilia Farm III Tower 1 | | 208 (682) | 57 | Residential | 2025 | | |
| 60 | The Pavilia Farm III Tower 8 | | 208 (682) | 57 | Residential | 2025 | | |
| 62 | Airside | | 207 (679) | 48 | Office | 2023 | 22°19′51.37″N 114°11′52.07″E | |
| 62 | Sorrento 6 | | 206 (676) | 60 | Residential | 2003 | 22°18′22.08″N 114°09′47.69″E | |
| 62 | Bellagio Tower 1–5 | | 206 (676) | 64 | Residential | 2005 | 22°21′57.31″N 114°03′43.04″E | |
| 62 | LOHAS Park Phase 1 The Capitol Tower 3 | | 206 (676) | 59 | Residential | 2009 | 22°17′46.03″N 114°16′18.23″E | The left side of this building is known as Milan Tower, while the right side is known as Montreal Tower. |
| 62 | LOHAS Park Phase 1 The Capitol Tower 5 | | 206 (676) | 59 | Residential | 2009 | 22°17′47.35″N 114°16′18.77″E | The left side of this building is known as Oslo Tower, while the right side is known as Venice Tower. |
| 66 | Citibank Plaza | | 206 (674) | 47 | Office | 1992 | 22°16′43.32″N 114°09′38.52″E | |
| 66 | May House | | 206 (674) | 47 | Government | 2004 | 22°16′43.59″N 114°10′04.66″E | This building is also known as Arsenal House. |
| 66 | Primrose Hill Tower 3 | | 206 (674) | 62 | Residential | 2010 | 22°22′20.96″N 114°07′48.13″E | |
| 69 | Four Seasons Place | | 205 (673) | 55 | Hotel, Residential | 2005 | 22°17′11.57″N 114°09′24.60″E | |
| 69 | Metro Town Tower 1 | | 205 (673) | 62 | Residential | 2006 | 22°18′17.58″N 114°15′09.78″E | |
| 69 | Metro Town Tower 2 | | 205 (673) | 62 | Residential | 2006 | 22°18′16.63″N 114°15′08.74″E | |
| 72 | Hysan Place | | 204 (670) | 36 | Office, Retail | 2012 | 22°16′47.28″N 114°11′00.96″E | This building is the first pre-certified LEED platinum building in Hong Kong. |
| 73 | Island Resort Tower 1–2 | | 202 (663) | 60 | Residential | 2001 | 22°15′59.25″N 114°15′00.52″E | |
| 73 | Island Resort Tower 3–5 | | 202 (663) | 60 | Residential | 2001 | 22°15′56.13″N 114°15′05.14″E | |
| 73 | Island Resort Tower 6–7 | | 202 (663) | 60 | Residential | 2001 | 22°15′58.36″N 114°15′05.20″E | |
| 73 | Island Resort Tower 8–9 | | 202 (663) | 60 | Residential | 2001 | 22°16′00.15″N 114°15′02.77″E | |
| 73 | The Dynasty Tower 1 | | 202 (663) | 51 | Residential | 2009 | 22°22′04.60″N 114°06′50.64″E | |
| 73 | The Dynasty Tower 2 | | 202 (663) | 51 | Residential | 2009 | 22°22′04.60″N 114°06′50.64″E | |
| 79 | China Online Centre | | 201 (660) | 52 | Office | 2000 | 22°16′45.16″N 114°10′42.10″E | |
| 80 | LOHAS Park Phase 1 The Capitol Tower 6 | | 200 (656) | 57 | Residential | 2009 | 22°17′49.00″N 114°16′19.61″E | The left side of this building is known as Vienna Tower, while the right side is known as Whistler Tower. |
| 80 | LOHAS Park Phase 2A Le Prestige Towers 1–3, 5 | | 200 (656) | 61 | Residential | 2010 | 22°17′35.19″N 114°16′21.45″E | Each of the four interconnected buildings have different names for the left and right sides: Tower 1, (L): Moon Light, (R): Mona Lisa; Tower 2, (L): Swan Lake, (R): Sunflower; Tower 3, (L): Four Seasons, (R): Starry Night; Tower 5, (L): Blue Danube, (R): Water Lilies |
| 82 | Conrad Hong Kong Hotel | | 199 (653) | 61 | Hotel, Residential | 1991 | 22°16′36.28″N 114°09′54.48″E | |
| 83 | Queensway Government Offices | | 199 (652) | 56 | Office | 1985 | 22°16′40.00″N 114°09′50.00″E | |
| 84 | Le Point Tower 06 | | 198 (651) | 60 | Residential | 2008 | 22°18′15.67″N 114°15′04.62″E | |
| 84 | Le Point Tower 07 | | 198 (651) | 60 | Residential | 2008 | 22°18′16.37″N 114°15′04.15″E | |
| 86 | Bellagio Tower 6–9 | | 198 (650) | 60 | Residential | 2002 | 22°22′00.54″N 114°03′39.50″E | |
| 87 | The Merton 1 | | 197 (646) | 59 | Residential | 2005 | 22°17′00.30″N 114°07′34.22″E | |
| 88 | Wharf Cable Tower | | 197 (645) | 41 | Office, Industrial | 1993 | 22°22′22.70″N 114°06′25.70″E | Tallest mixed office and industrial building in the city. |
| 89 | Aigburth | | 196 (643) | 48 | Residential | 1999 | 22°16′24.71″N 114°09′10.98″E | |
| 90 | Vision City 2 | | 195 (640) | 54 | Residential | 2007 | 22°22′12.50″N 114°06′48.81″E | |
| 90 | Vision City 3 | | 195 (640) | 54 | Residential | 2007 | 22°22′13.44″N 114°06′49.59″E | |
| 90 | Vision City 5 | | 195 (640) | 54 | Residential | 2007 | 22°22′14.32″N 114°06′50.88″E | This building is also known as Vision City Tower 4. |
| 90 | Le Point Tower 08 | | 195 (640) | 59 | Residential | 2008 | 22°18′17.74″N 114°15′05.49″E | |
| 90 | Le Point Tower 09 | | 195 (640) | 59 | Residential | 2008 | 22°18′18.81″N 114°15′06.59″E | |
| 90 | Le Point Tower 10 | | 195 (640) | 59 | Residential | 2008 | 22°18′19.88″N 114°15′07.69″E | |
| 96 | Times Square Natwest Tower | | 194 (636) | 48 | Office | 1993 | 22°16′41.74″N 114°10′57.67″E | |
| 97 | Manhattan Hill 1–2 | | 193 (633) | 51 | Residential | 2007 | 22°20′02.78″N 114°08′32.05″E | |
| 98 | LOHAS Park Phase 4B Wings At Sea Tower 5 | | 193 (632) | 53 | Residential | 2018 | 22°17′34.62″N 114°16′13.97″E | |
| 99 | Vision City 1 | | 192 (630) | 53 | Residential | 2007 | 22°22′10.90″N 114°06′48.16″E | |
| 1-- | 39 Conduit Road | | 192 (629) | 42 | Residential | 2009 | 22°16′54.95″N 114°08′47.84″E | |
| 100 | Banyan Garden 2 | | 191 (628) | 57 | Residential | 2003 | 22°20′03.88″N 114°08′49.51″E | |
| 100 | Banyan Garden 6 | | 191 (628) | 57 | Residential | 2003 | 22°20′04.15″N 114°08′52.89″E | |
| 100 | Banyan Garden 7 | | 191 (628) | 57 | Residential | 2003 | 22°20′05.28″N 114°08′52.80″E | |
| 100 | The Pacifica 6 | | 191 (628) | 58 | Residential | 2005 | 22°20′02.76″N 114°09′00.54″E | |
| 100 | The Pacifica 7 | | 191 (628) | 58 | Residential | 2005 | 22°20′02.62″N 114°08′58.53″E | |
| 106 | LOHAS Park Phase 3A Hemera Tower 3 | | 190 (624) | 54 | Residential | 2014 | 22°17′49.31″N 114°16′12.82″E | This building is also known as Amber Tower. |
| 106 | LOHAS Park Phase 3A Hemera Tower 5 | | 190 (624) | 54 | Residential | 2014 | 22°17′49.90″N 114°16′14.04″E | This building is also known as Topaz Tower. |
| 108 | Cullinan West Phase 5 Tower 6 | — | 190 (623) | 56 | Residential | 2020 | 22°19′40.29″N 114°09′10.51″E | |
| 108 | Cullinan West Phase 5 Tower 7 | — | 190 (623) | 56 | Residential | 2020 | 22°19′41.22″N 114°09′09.34″E | |
| 108 | Cullinan West Phase 5 Tower 8 | — | 190 (623) | 56 | Residential | 2020 | 22°19′41.91″N 114°09′08.43″E | |
| 108 | The Henderson | — | 190 (623) | 36 | Office | 2024 | 22°16′48.95″N 114°09′43.27″E | This project replaced the Murray Road Multi-storey Car Park Building. |
| 111 | Primrose Hill Tower 2 | | 190 (622) | 55 | Residential | 2010 | 22°22′20.21″N 114°07′47.35″E | |
| 112 | The Centrium | | 189 (620) | 41 | Office | 2001 | 22°16′50.56″N 114°09′16.88″E | |
| 112 | The Merton 2 | | 189 (620) | 55 | Residential | 2005 | 22°16′59.31″N 114°07′34.43″E | |
| 114 | One Exchange Square | | 188 (617) | 52 | Office | 1985 | 22°17′00.00″N 114°09′30.51″E | |
| 114 | Two Exchange Square | | 188 (617) | 52 | Office | 1985 | 22°17′01.86″N 114°09′30.18″E | |
| 114 | Oxford House Time Warner | — | 188 (617) | 41 | Office | 1999 | 22°17′12.58″N 114°12′49.64″E | |
| 114 | Metro Town Tower 3 | | 188 (617) | 57 | Residential | 2006 | 22°18′15.76″N 114°15′07.75″E | |
| 114 | Metro Town Tower 5 | | 188 (617) | 57 | Residential | 2006 | 22°18′14.34″N 114°15′05.95″E | This building is known as Metro Town – Tower 4. |
| 119 | 9 Queen's Road Central | | 187 (614) | 39 | Office | 1991 | 22°16′49.09″N 114°09′30.56″E | |
| 119 | Millennium City 5 | | 187 (614) | 45 | Office | 2004 | 22°18′44.44″N 114°13′30.53″E | |
| 119 | Landmark East Tower 1 | | 187 (614) | 43 | Office | 2008 | 22°18′43.30″N 114°13′23.50″E | |
| 119 | Landmark East Tower 2 | | 187 (614) | 43 | Hotel, Office | 2008 | 22°18′44.52″N 114°13′20.43″E | |
| 123 | Entertainment Building | | 187 (612) | 33 | Office | 1993 | 22°16′53.40″N 114°09′23.50″E | |
| 123 | Manhattan Hill 3 | | 187 (612) | 48 | Residential | 2007 | 22°20′04.72″N 114°08′32.49″E | |
| 123 | Manhattan Hill 5 | | 187 (612) | 48 | Residential | 2007 | 22°20′06.32″N 114°08′32.77″E | |
| 123 | Manhattan Hill 6 | | 187 (612) | 48 | Residential | 2007 | 22°20′08.01″N 114°08′33.26″E | |
| 123 | Festival City III Tower 5 | | 187 (612) | 58 | Residential | 2011 | 22°22′18.93″N 114°10′39.77″E | |
| 128 | Lippo Centre II | | 186 (610) | 48 | Office | 1988 | 22°16′45.27″N 114°09′48.25″E | |
| 128 | 8 Clearwater Bay Road | | 186 (610) | 53 | Residential | 2005 | 22°20′02.34″N 114°12′35.53″E | |
| 130 | The Westpoint | | 186 (609) | 41 | Office | 1999 | 22°17′16.44″N 114°08′23.28″E | |
| 131 | Standard Chartered Bank Building | | 185 (607) | 42 | Office | 1990 | 22°16′48.26″N 114°09′32.55″E | |
| 131 | Sino Plaza | | 185 (607) | 38 | Office | 1992 | 22°16′52.93″N 114°10′56.03″E | |
| 131 | Manhattan Heights | | 185 (607) | 55 | Residential | 2000 | 22°17′01.00″N 114°07′38.30″E | |
| 131 | AIA Central | | 185 (607) | 40 | Office | 2005 | 22°16′52.50″N 114°09′42.50″E | This building was formerly known as AIG Tower. |
| 135 | Festival City III Tower 1 | | 185 (606) | 58 | Residential | 2011 | 22°22′16.13″N 114°10′35.56″E | |
| 135 | Festival City III Tower 2 | | 185 (606) | 58 | Residential | 2011 | 22°22′17.18″N 114°10′36.97″E | |
| 135 | Festival City III Tower 3 | | 185 (606) | 58 | Residential | 2011 | 22°22′18.12″N 114°10′38.33″E | |
| 138 | Manhattan Place | | 185 (605) | 40 | Office | 2008 | 22°19′11.49″N 114°12′37.11″E | |
| 139 | Ocean Pointe | | 184 (603) | 54 | Residential | 2001 | 22°21′56.52″N 114°03′44.64″E | |
| 140 | Cadogan | | 184 (602) | 49 | Residential | 2014 | 22°16′55.49″N 114°07′35.42″E | |
| 141 | Vision City 6 | | 183 (600) | 50 | Residential | 2007 | 22°22′14.42″N 114°06′52.19″E | This building is also known as Vision City Tower 5. |
| 141 | LOHAS Park Phase 4B Wings At Sea Tower 3 | | 183 (600) | 50 | Residential | 2018 | 22°17′34.83″N 114°16′16.17″E | |
| 143 | Banyan Garden 5 | | 183 (599) | 54 | Residential | 2003 | 22°20′02.62″N 114°08′52.73″E | |
| 144 | Chelsea Court Tower South | | 182 (598) | 51 | Residential | 2005 | 22°22′00.61″N 114°06′59.04″E | |
| 145 | Three Pacific Place | | 182 (597) | 40 | Office | 2004 | 22°16′36.40″N 114°10′05.37″E | |
| 145 | Branksome Crest | | 182 (597) | 47 | Residential | 2003 | 22°16′22.35″N 114°09′18.59″E | |
| 147 | One Silversea 1–8 | | 182 (596) | 45 | Residential | 2006 | 22°19′02.83″N 114°09′20.20″E | |
| 148 | Convention Plaza Office Tower | | 181 (595) | 50 | Office | 1990 | 22°16′50.41″N 114°10′26.34″E | |
| 148 | The Pavilia Bay Tower 1 | | 181 (595) | 51 | Residential | 2018 | 22°21′57.34″N 114°06′43.16″E | |
| 150 | Immigration Tower | | 181 (593) | 49 | Office | 1990 | 22°16′47.00″N 114°10′23.00″E | |
| 150 | Revenue Tower | | 181 (593) | 49 | Office | 1990 | 22°16′47.00″N 114°10′19.00″E | |
| 150 | Liberté 1 | | 181 (593) | 51 | Residential | 2003 | 22°20′02.54″N 114°08′54.81″E | |
| 150 | Liberté 2 | | 181 (593) | 51 | Residential | 2003 | 22°20′02.64″N 114°08′55.93″E | |
| 150 | Liberté 3 | | 181 (593) | 51 | Residential | 2003 | 22°20′02.69″N 114°08′57.05″E | |
| 150 | LOHAS Park Phase 4A Wings At Sea Tower 2 | | 181 (593) | 49 | Residential | 2017 | 22°17′34.19″N 114°16′17.28″E | |
| 156 | AIA Tower | | 180 (592) | 44 | Office | 1999 | 22°17′19.59″N 114°11′32.06″E | |
| 157 | Liberté 5 | | 180 (591) | 52 | Residential | 2003 | 22°20′04.98″N 114°08′56.80″E | |
| 157 | Liberté 6 | | 180 (591) | 52 | Residential | 2003 | 22°20′06.95″N 114°08′56.80″E | |
| 157 | Sham Wan Towers 1 | | 180 (591) | 51 | Residential | 2003 | 22°14′37.35″N 114°09′30.55″E | |
| 157 | Sham Wan Towers 2 | | 180 (591) | 51 | Residential | 2003 | 22°14′37.87″N 114°09′31.56″E | |
| 157 | Sham Wan Towers 3 | | 180 (591) | 45 | Residential | 2003 | 22°14′38.43″N 114°09′32.68″E | |
| 157 | The Merton 3 | | 180 (591) | 51 | Residential | 2005 | 22°16′58.21″N 114°07′35.77″E | |
| 157 | Residences Bel-Air Phase 6 8–9 | | 180 (591) | 49 | Residential | 2008 | 22°15′18.61″N 114°07′59.31″E | |
| 157 | Residences Bel-Air Phase 6 6–7 | | 180 (591) | 48 | Residential | 2008 | 22°15′18.61″N 114°07′59.31″E | |
| 165 | Banyan Garden 3 | | 180 (590) | 53 | Residential | 2003 | 22°20′02.43″N 114°08′49.89″E | |
| 166 | HSBC Main Building | | 178.8 (586) | 43 | Commercial | 1980 | | Headquarters of The Hongkong and Shanghai Banking Corporation Limited |
| 167 | Jardine House | | 178.5 | 52 | Commercial | 1972 | | |
| 168 | China Resources Center | | 178 | 48 | Commercial | 1983 | | |
| 169 | OAK 28 | | 178 | 58 | Residential | 2011 | | |
| 170 | Alassio | | 176.4 | 52 | Residential | 2016 | | |
| 171 | One Kowloon | | 176 | 39 | Office | 2006 | | |
| 172 | One Mid Town | | 175 | 41 | Industrial | 2012 | | |
| 173 | Ocean Shores | | 174 | 58 | Residential | 2003 | | |
| 174 | Manhattan Place | | 173 | 58 | Office | 2003 | | |
| 174 | One SilverSea | | 173 | 47 | Residential | 2006 | | |
| 176 | Harbour Green | | 171 | 50 | Residential | 2007 | | |
| 176 | Metro Harbour View | | 171 | 50 | Residential | 2004 | | |
| 178 | 15 Homantin Hill | | 170 | 45 | Residential | 2006 | | |

== Tallest under construction or proposed ==
This list ranks under construction, topped-out and planned buildings that are expected to stand at least 180 metres (591 ft) tall, based on standard height measurement. This includes spires and architectural details but does not include antenna masts. The "Year" column indicates the year in which a building is expected to be complete. A floor count of 50 storeys is used as the cutoff in place of a height of 180 m (591 ft) for buildings whose heights have not yet been released by their developers.

| Name | Height^{[D]} m (ft) | Floors^{[D]}^{[E]} | Use | Year* | Status | Coordinates | Notes |
|---|---|---|---|---|---|---|---|
| Mong Kok East Station Redevelopment – Tower 2 | 320 (1,050) | 70 | Office | 2028 | Under construction | | |
| Wan Chai North Redevelopment Landmark Tower | 295 (968) | 56 | Office, Hotel | — | Proposed | | |
| Kwun Tong Town Centre Redevelopment Landmark Tower | 360 (1180) | Undetermined | Commercial, Residential | — | Proposed | 22°18′47.25″N 114°13′33.92″E | Project height and floor count were revised from 285 m (935 feet) and 68 floors. |
| LOHAS Park Phase 7A Montara Tower 1 | 229 (752) | 65 | Residential | 2021 | Under construction | 22°17′38.99″N 114°16′11.97″E | |
| LOHAS Park Phase 7B Grand Montara Tower 2 | 229 (752) | 65 | Residential | 2021 | Under construction | 22°17′42.10″N 114°16′14.20″E | |
| LOHAS Park Phase 9B Grand Marini Tower 2 | 223 (730) | 63 | Residential | 2021 | Under construction | 22°17′33.96″N 114°16′06.00″E | |
| LOHAS Park Phase 9C Ocean Marini Tower 3 | 223 (730) | 63 | Residential | 2021 | Under construction | 22°17′33.35″N 114°16′05.05″E | |
| LOHAS Park Phase 9A Marini Tower 1 | 216 (709) | 61 | Residential | 2021 | Under construction | 22°17′35.36″N 114°16′06.87″E | |
| LOHAS Park Phase 8 Sea to Sky Tower 3 | 213 (700) | 61 | Residential | 2021 | Under construction | 22°17′39.28″N 114°16′02.03″E | |
| LOHAS Park Phase 8 Sea to Sky Tower 2 | 210 (689) | 60 | Residential | 2021 | Under construction | 22°17′38.01″N 114°16′01.51″E | |
| Hopewell Centre II | 210 (689) | 55 | Hotel | — | Under construction | 22°16′29.65″N 114°10′15.66″E | |
| Cheung Kong Center 2 | 205 (674) | 41 | Office | 2023 | Under construction | | |
| Taikoo Place Redevelopment Phase 2B Building | 191 (627) | 46 | Office | 2021 | Under construction | 22°17′11.87″N 114°12′46.06″E | This project is also known as Warwick House Redevelopment.; Project height revised from 160 m (525 feet) and 195 m (640 feet).; Project will begin no earlier than 2016, after Somerset House redevelopment. |
| LOHAS Park Phase 8 Sea to Sky Tower 1 | 190 (623) | 54 | Residential | 2021 | Under construction | 22°17′36.50″N 114°16′01.48″E | |

*Table entry without text indicate that one or more of the following information regarding building heights, floor counts and/or year of completion has not yet been released.

== Demolished buildings ==
This table lists buildings in Hong Kong that were demolished which once stood at least 40 m (131 ft) tall.

| Name | Image | Height m (ft) | Floors | Years existed | Coordinates | Replacement building | Notes |
|---|---|---|---|---|---|---|---|
| The Ritz-Carlton Hong Kong (Central) | | 142 (465) | 31 | 1992–2008 (16 years) | 22°16′52.88″N 114°09′41.28″E | China Construction Bank Tower | |
| Hennessy Centre | | 140 (458) | 41 | 1981–2006 (25 years) | 22°16′47.28″N 114°11′0.96″E | Hysan Place | |
| Furama Kempinski Hotel | | 110 (360) | 33 | 1973–2002 (29 years) | 22°16′52.50″N 114°09′42.50″E | AIG Tower (now AIA Central) | |
| Lodge on the Park | — | 97 (317) | 29 | 1988–2011 (23 years) | 22°16′35.00″N 114°09′25.50″E | Kennedy Park at Central | |
| Beautiful City Building | — | 93 (306) | 28 | 1978 – c. 2003 (~25 years) | 22°17′21.70″N 114°12′33.52″E | CASA 880 | |
| Tai Sang Commercial Building | — | 90 (295) | 27 | 1977–2009 (32 years) | 22°16′38.74″N 114°10′09.67″E | 24-34 Hennessy Road Redevelopment | |
| Hong Kong Hilton | | 87 (284) | 26 | 1962–1995 (33 years) | 22°16′47.21″N 114°09′37.80″E | Cheung Kong Centre | |
| Elegant Court | — | 83 (273) | 25 | 1987 – c. 2009 (~22 years) | 22°17′09.73″N 114°11′26.76″E | Twenty One Whitfield | |
| Crocodile House 1 | — | 77 (251) | 23 | 1982–2008 (26 years) | 22°17′06.18″N 114°09′21.29″E | Agricultural Bank of China Tower (50 Connaught Road Central) | |
| Melbourne Industrial Building | — | 77 (251) | 23 | 1972–2003 (31 years) | 22°17′09.74″N 114°12′48.39″E | One Island East | |
| Aik San Factory Building | — | 73 (240) | 22 | 1969–2003 (34 years) | 22°17′08.62″N 114°12′48.37″E | One Island East | |
| Lee Gardens Hotel | | 73 (240) | 22 | c. 1970s–c. 1990s (~20 years) | 22°16′42.00″N 114°11′04.60″E | Manulife Plaza | |
| Ananda Tower | — | 70 (229) | 21 | 1978–2008 (30 years) | 22°17′06.89″N 114°09′20.78″E | Agricultural Bank of China Tower (50 Connaught Road Central) | |
| Hong Kong & Shanghai Bank (3rd Generation) | | 70 (230) | 13 | 1935–1981 (46 years) | 22°16′48.00″N 114°09′34.00″E | HSBC Building (Current) | |
| Swire House | — | 67 (219) | 20 | 1962–1998 (36 years) | 22°16′56.01″N 114°09′30.24″E | Chater House | Originally known as Union House. |
| Crocodile House 2 | — | 63 (208) | 19 | 1966–2008 (42 years) | 22°17′06.60″N 114°09′20.99″E | Agricultural Bank of China Tower (50 Connaught Road Central) | |
| Chartered Bank Building | — | 60 (197) | 18 | 1958–1987 (28 years) | 22°16′48.26″N 114°09′32.55″E | Standard Chartered Bank Building | |
| Hyatt Regency Hong Kong | — | 60 (197) | 18 | 1964–2006 (42 years) | 22°17′49.00″N 114°10′19.00″E | iSQUARE | Also known as President Hotel. |
| Tung Ying Building | | 57 (186) | 17 | 1965–2006 (41 years) | 22°17′58.56″N 114°10′19.92″E | The ONE | |
| Tung Sang Building | — | 57 (186) | 17 | 1972–2006 (34 years) | 22°16′36.80″N 114°10′13.29″E | York Place | |
| City East Building | — | 53 (175) | 16 | 1973–2007 (34 years) | 22°16′29.18″N 114°10′21.56″E | Gardeneast Serviced Apartments | |
| Jardine House (3rd Generation) | — | 53 (175) | 16 | 1957–1982 (25 years) | 22°16′54.84″N 114°09′26.64″E | Wheelock House | |
| Chiao Shang Building | — | 50 (164) | 15 | 1964–2004 (40 years) | 22°16′59.99″N 114°09′17.79″E | 100QRC (100 Queen's Road Central) | |
| Dragon Seed Building | — | 43 (142) | 13 | 1966–2008 (42 years) | 22°16′57.26″N 114°09′22.27″E | Prosperity Tower (39 Queen's Road Central) | |
| Luk Hoi Tong Building | | 43 (142) | 13 | 1961–2008 (47 years) | 22°16′55.46″N 114°09′23.54″E | LHT Tower (31 Queen's Road Central) | |
| Alexandra House (2nd Generation) | — | 43 (142) | 13 | 1952–1974 (22 years) | 22°16′54.04″N 114°09′30.52″E | Alexandra House (Current) | |
| Kingsford Industrial Centre | — | 40 (131) | 12 | 1986–2006 (20 years) | 22°17′37.58″N 114°14′12.76″E | The Spectacle | |

== Notable cancelled or vision projects ==
This lists notable projects that were abandoned, cancelled or never meant to be built that had a planned height of at least 400 m (1,300 ft).

| Name | Height m (ft) | Floors* | Notes |
|---|---|---|---|
| Bionic Tower | 1,228 (4,029)^{[F]} | 300 | A visionary proposal for a vertical city housing at least 100,000 people. |
| Kowloon MTR Tower | 574 (1,883)^{[G]} | 102 | Original proposal for the Union Square development project in Kowloon was planned to be a candidate for the tallest building in the world.; New height restriction laws prohibited buildings from rising taller than surrounding mountains, forcing a reduction in height.; Project was also known as Kowloon Station Phase 7.; The project now completed as International Commerce Centre. |
| Original Nina Tower Proposal | 518 (1,699) | 108 | The original proposal for Nina Tower was planned to be the world's tallest building in 1994.; The proposal was rejected by the government due to the project's location near a major airway of the newly established Hong Kong International Airport.; The as-built tower is literally split in two, with the dominant part being Nina Tower and the smaller part being Teddy Tower. |
| SAR Government Centre | 450 (1,476) | — | Project was moved to the Tamar Site and built as the Central Government Complex. |
| The Gateway III | 405 (1,329)^{[H]} | 96 | Project was rejected due to conflict with height restriction laws and ultimately cancelled. |
| Hong Kong Wanchai Tower | 400 (1,312) | — | |

* Table entries without text indicate that information regarding floor counts have not been determined or remain unknown.

== Timeline of tallest buildings ==
This lists buildings that once held the title of tallest building in Hong Kong.

| Name | Image | Years as tallest | Height m (ft) | Floors^{[E]} | Location | Reference |
|---|---|---|---|---|---|---|
| Hong Kong & Shanghai Bank Building (3rd Generation) | | 1935–1950 (15 years) | 70 (230) | 13 | 1 Queen's Road Central; 22°16′48.00″N 114°09′34.00″E | |
| Bank of China Building | | 1950–1963 (13 years) | 76 (250) | 17 | 2A Des Voeux Road Central; 22°16′48.93″N 114°09′36.20″E | |
| Mandarin Oriental, Hong Kong | | 1963–1966 (3 years) | 91 (300) | 25 | 5 Connaught Road; 22°16′53″N 114°9′27″E | |
| Kiu Kwan Mansion | | 1966–1971 (5 years) | 95 (312) | 28 | 395 King's Road; 22°17′28.32″N 114°11′57.12″E | |
| Pearl City Mansion | | 1971–1973 (2 years) | 109 (358) | 34 | 22-36 Paterson Street; 22°16′51.60″N 114°11′08.88″E | |
| Jardine House^{[B]} | | 1973–1980 (7 years) | 179 (586) | 52 | 1 Connaught Place; 22°16′59.00″N 114°09′32.00″E | |
| Hopewell Centre | | 1980–1990 (10 years) | 222 (728) | 64 | 183 Queen's Road East; 22°16′28.25″N 114°10′17.76″E | |
| Bank of China Tower | | 1990–1992 (2 years) | 367 (1,205) | 70 | 1 Garden Road; 22°16′45.00″N 114°09′41.00″E | |
| Central Plaza | | 1992–2003 (11 years) | 374 (1,227) | 78 | 18 Harbour Road; 22°16′48.00″N 114°10′25.00″E | |
| Two International Finance Centre | | 2003–2010 (7 years) | 416 (1,364) | 88 | 8 Finance Street; 22°17′07.09″N 114°09′33.37″E | |
| International Commerce Centre | | 2010–present | 484 (1,588) | 108 | 1 Austin Road, Kowloon; 22°18′12.21″N 114°09′36.61″E | |

== See also ==
- Architecture of Hong Kong
- List of cities with most skyscrapers
- List of tallest buildings in China

== Notes ==
A.^{1} The figure of 480 counts only buildings with known height figures greater than 150 m (492 ft). There are a number of completed buildings that are at least 50 storeys tall that do not have height figures listed as seen here, here and here on Emporis as well as CTBUH. It is possible but not definite that some of these skyscrapers are taller than 150 m (492 ft); thus, it is safe to only be stated that there are at least 480 buildings that are at least 150 m (492 ft) high.
B.^{1} ^{2} This building was constructed as the Connaught Centre, but has since been renamed Jardine House.
C.^{1} Tower numbers may not be assigned sequentially in Hong Kong's multi-tower complexes due to the number 4 and its meaning in Chinese culture. Hence, it is common practice to skip the label "Tower 4" in complexes with four or more actual towers. A building named "Tower 8" in a complex may not imply that there are eight actual towers in said complex. As an example, a complex of six actual towers may have the first trio of towers be assigned Towers 1, 2, 3 and the second trio Towers 5, 6 and 7. The same may occur for large projects that have four or more phases of development.
D.^{1} ^{2} ^{3} ^{4} For groups of two or more interconnected buildings, the height shown refers to the tallest building of the group. The floor count shown refers to that of the tallest building in question.
E.^{1} ^{2} ^{3} Due to common practice of skipping floors with the number 4 (e.g. 4, 14, 24, 34, ... and so on) and 13 in Hong Kong, floors may not be labelled sequentially. Thus a building's total count of actual floors may not be equal to the number of the top floor. As an example, one residential tower has a top floor labelled "88", but contains only 42 actual floors. Sources that state the number of the top floor for a building's floor count may overstate the actual number of floors for the building in question. See numbers in Chinese culture, unlucky 13 and thirteenth floor for more background information.
F.^{1} Two height figures were given for the Bionic Tower: 1,128 m (3,701 ft) and 1,228 m (4,029 ft). An official figure has not been determined.
G.^{1} One design iteration of the Kowloon MTR Tower has a spire that reached 610 m (2,001 ft) in height.
H.^{1} Two height figures were given for the Gateway Tower III: 405 m (1,329 ft) and 450 m (1,476 ft). An official figure has not been determined.
