= Sham Wan Towers =

Housing estate in Ap Lei Chau, Hong Kong

Coordinates: 22.243688°N 114.158543°E

- 深灣軒
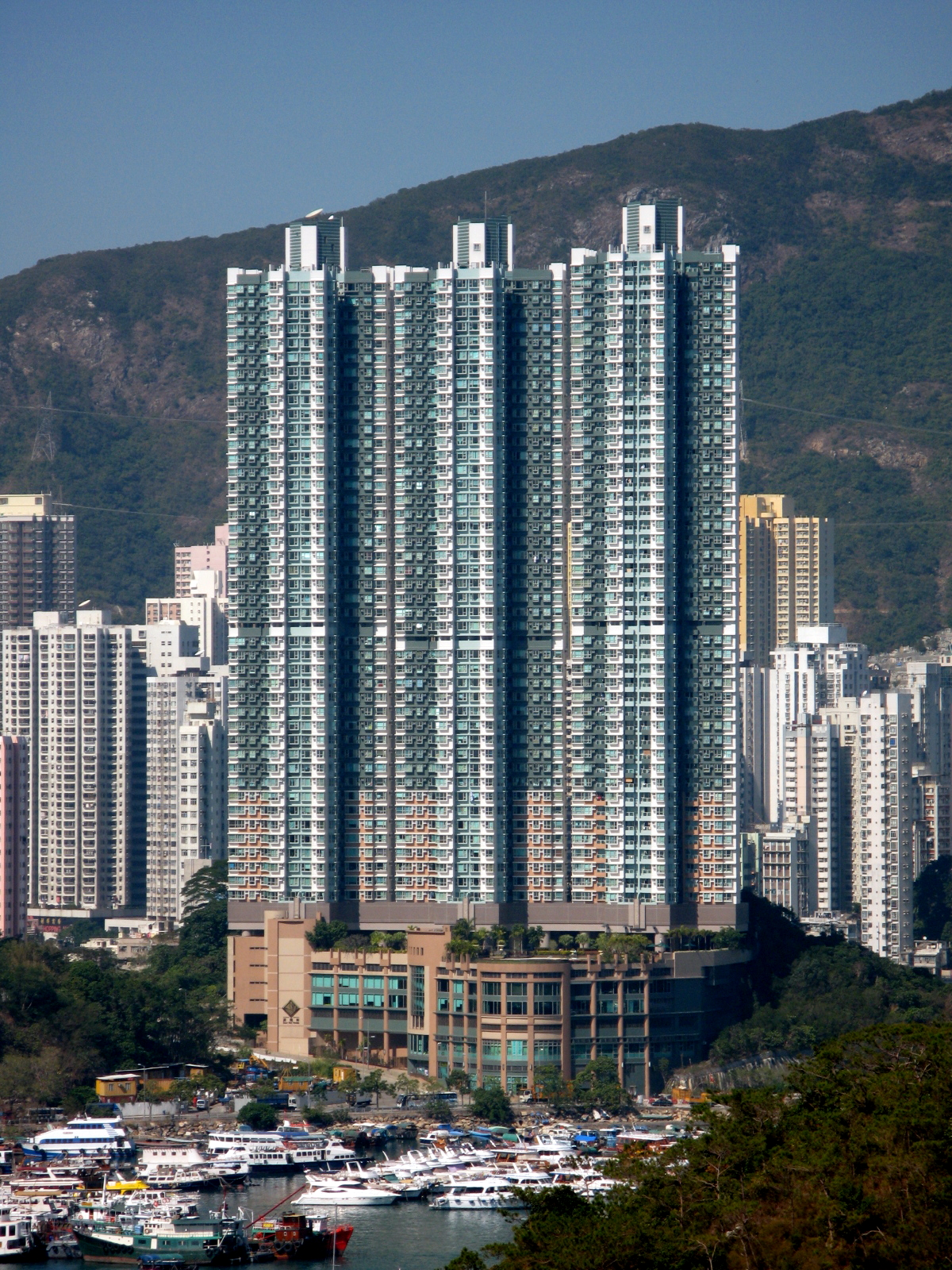
- Interactive map of the Sham Wan Towers area

General information
- Type: Residential
- Location: 3 Ap Lei Chau Drive, Ap Lei Chau, Hong Kong
- Completed: 2003; 23 years ago
- Opening: 2003; 23 years ago

Height
- Roof: 180 m (590 ft)

Technical details
- Floor count: Tower 1: 51; Tower 2: 51; Tower 3: 53

Design and construction
- Architect: AGC Design
- Developer: Sun Hung Kai Properties, Cheung Kong Infrastructure Holdings

The Sham Wan Towers (Chinese: 深灣軒) is a residential high-rise development located in the Ap Lei Chau area of Hong Kong. The complex consists of three towers, each of which rank among the tallest buildings in the city. The towers, numbered 1, 2, and 3, each rise 180 metres (591 ft), but differ in floor counts; Towers 1 and 2 contain 52 floors, while Tower 3 has 53. The entire complex was completed in 2003. The structures, designed by architectural firm AGC Design and developed in a collaboration between Cheung Kong Infrastructure Holdings and Sun Hung Kai Properties, are composed entirely of residential units.

== Politics ==
Sham Wan Towers is located in Ap Lei Chau North constituency of the Southern District Council. It was formerly represented by Chan Ping-yeung, who was elected in the 2019 elections until July 2021.

== See also ==
- List of tallest buildings in Hong Kong
- Sham Wan (Southern District)
