= 8 Clearwater Bay Road =

Building in Wong Tai Sin District, Hong Kong

- 清水湾道8号
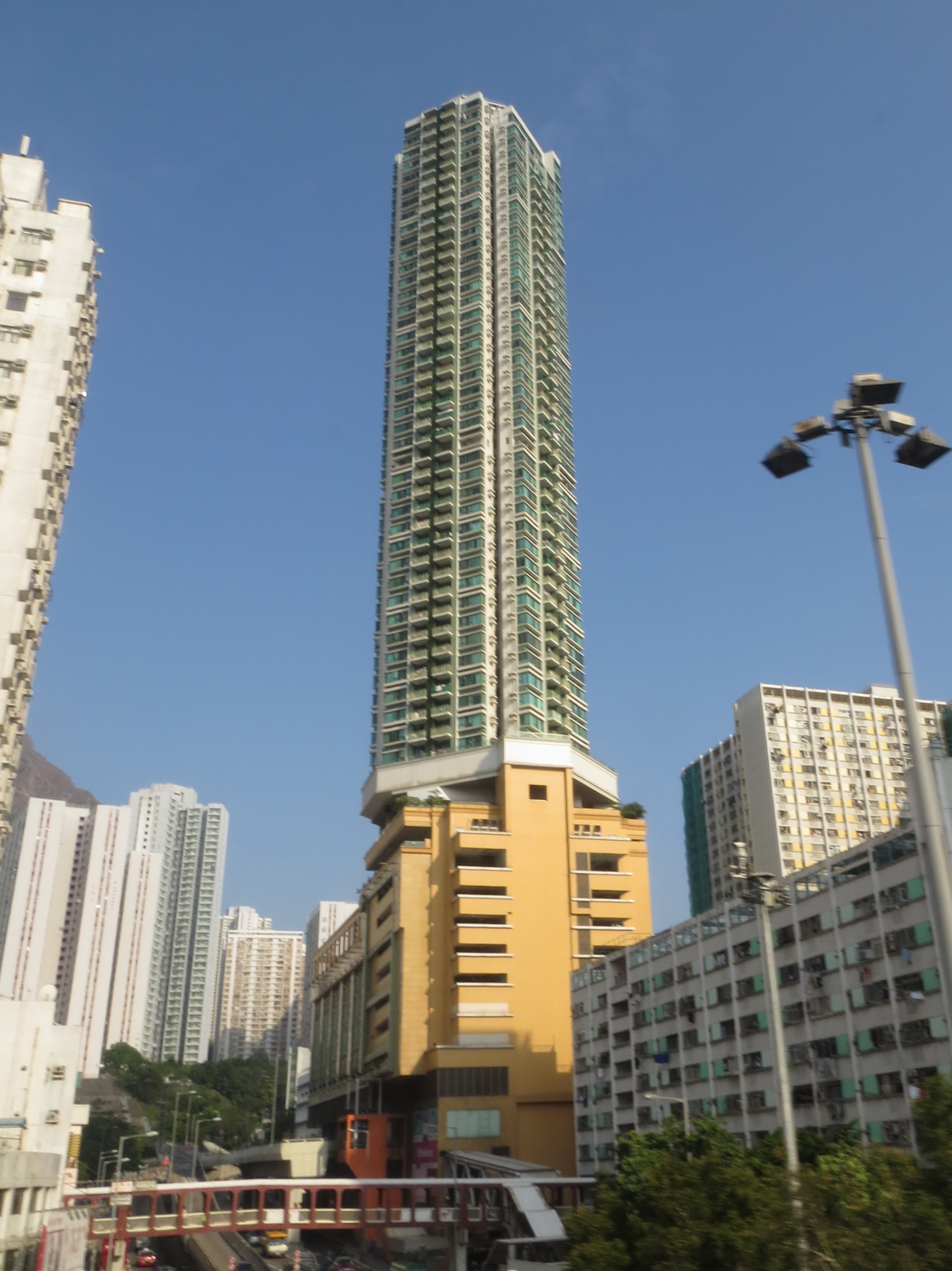
- Interactive map of the 8 Clearwater Bay Road area

General information
- Status: Completed
- Type: Residential
- Location: 8 Clear Water Bay Rd, Ngau Chi Wan, Wong Tai Sin District, Hong Kong
- Coordinates: 22.33391°N 114.20981°E
- Construction started: 2002
- Completed: 2005

Height
- Roof: 186 m (610 ft)

Technical details
- Structural system: Reinforced concrete
- Floor count: 53
- Floor area: 32,500 m^{2} (350,000 sq ft)

Design and construction
- Architect: Ronald Lu & Partners

8 Clearwater Bay Road (Chinese: 清水湾道8号) is a residential skyscraper in the Wong Tai Sin District of Hong Kong. Built between 2002 and 2005, the tower stands at 186 m (610 ft) with 53 floors and is the current 126th tallest building in Hong Kong.

== Architecture ==
The building has been described as a TOD "pencil-building". It is located above the Choi Hung station of the MTR, at the former Ping Shek bus terminal on the Clear Water Bay Road in the Wong Tai Sin District of Hong Kong. The construction and real estate firm Chun Wo Development in 2001 purchased the site above the MTR station and built 8 Clearwater Bay Road. The project has a gross floor area (GFA) of 32,500 m^{2} (350,000 sq ft). It consists of 40 residential storeys offering approximately 310 rentable apartment units.

On each floor, the building has between six and eight units. In total, there are 316 units. The base of the site has a shopping mall and a multi-level parking garage. People live in units on floors 12 through 57. The units have floor areas that are between 622 and 988 sq ft (57.8 and 91.8 m^{2}). They are two-bedroom, three-bedroom, and three-bedroom-with-suite units. The units at the top of the building overlook the waterfront near where Kai Tak Airport used to be. In 2005, finance columnist Chan Yan Chong, who was the director of the master of management program at the City University of Hong Kong, spent HK$7,000,000 (US$900,901) to buy two connected units. The units, which were on the 50th floor, were around 1,300 sq ft (121 m^{2}).

== See also ==
- List of tallest buildings in Hong Kong
