= Tregunter Towers =

Tregunter 3
- 地利根德閣第三座
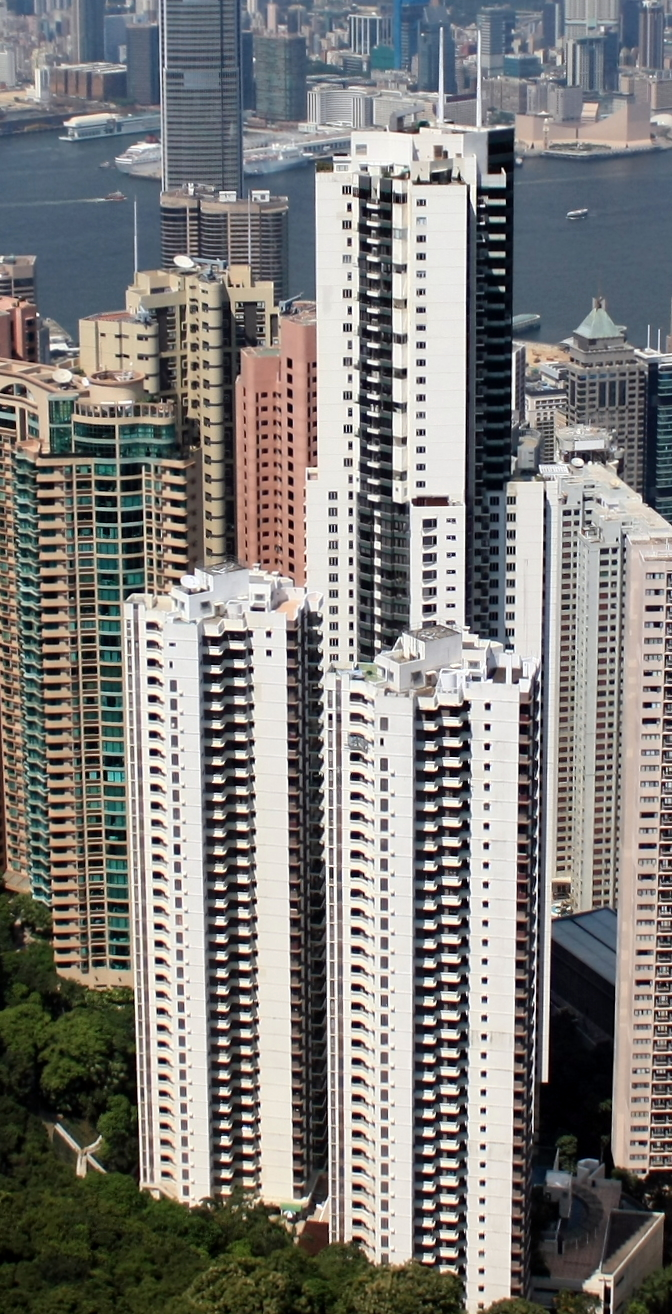
- Interactive map of the Tregunter 3 area

General information
- Status: Completed
- Type: Residential
- Location: 14 Tregunter Path, The Peak, Hong Kong
- Coordinates: 22°16′27.0″N 114°09′09.0″E
- Opening: 1981; 45 years ago (Tregunter 1 and 2); 1993; 33 years ago (Tregunter 3)

Height
- Roof: 219.7 metres (721 ft)

Technical details
- Floor count: 66

Design and construction
- Architect: Chung Wah Nan Architects Ltd
- Main contractor: Hip Hing Construction Co. Ltd

The Tregunter Towers (Chinese: 地利根德閣) is a complex of three residential buildings located in The Peak on Hong Kong Island, Hong Kong. All three highrises, named Tregunter 1 (地利根德閣第一座), Tregunter 2 (地利根德閣第二座), and Tregunter 3 (地利根德閣第三座).

Tregunter 1 and 2 were developed by Hong Kong Land, designed by Chun Wah Nam Architect and constructed by John Lok and Partners, both completed in the year 1981 and both buildings have similar floor counts at 34 and 33 respectively. The last building of the complex, Tregunter 3, was completed in 1993 or twelve years after Tregunters 1 and 2. The third tower was designed by Rocco Yim Architects Ltd and constructed by Hip Hing Construction Co. Ltd. Tregunter 3 stands significantly taller than the first two buildings of the complex at 220 m (721 feet) with 66 stories. The top floor of Tregunter 3 stands 327 m (1,073 ft) above sea level. Upon its completion, Tregunter 3 was the world's tallest all-residential building, taking the title from the Lake Point Tower in Chicago. Tregunter 3 held this distinction until the completion of Trump World Tower in 2001. Standard apartments range from 1600 square feet to over 2500 square feet in size.

The three Tregunter towers share the common facilities which often regarded as one of the most complete in the area especially for older buildings. The common facilities include a clubhouse, an outdoor tennis court and an outdoor swimming pool. Within the clubhouse, there are other sport facilities such as badminton, squash, table tennis, basketball, weight training, aerobics, etc. The clubhouse also has a restaurant, and function rooms reserved for the use by the Tregunter residents. There are also two shuttle bus routes between the complex and Central and the complex and Admiralty.

Frenchman Remi Lucidi, known as Remi Enigma, who became famous for his social media photos of climbs on gigantic buildings and structures over the world, died on 29 July 2023, at the age of 30, after falling from the 68th floor of the Tregunter 3 Tower when he got trapped outside the top floor penthouse. He was seen calling for help by a maid on one of the top floors just before falling, but it was too late and police spotted the dead body on arrival.

== See also ==
- List of tallest buildings in Hong Kong
