= 9 Queen's Road Central =

- 皇后大道中九號
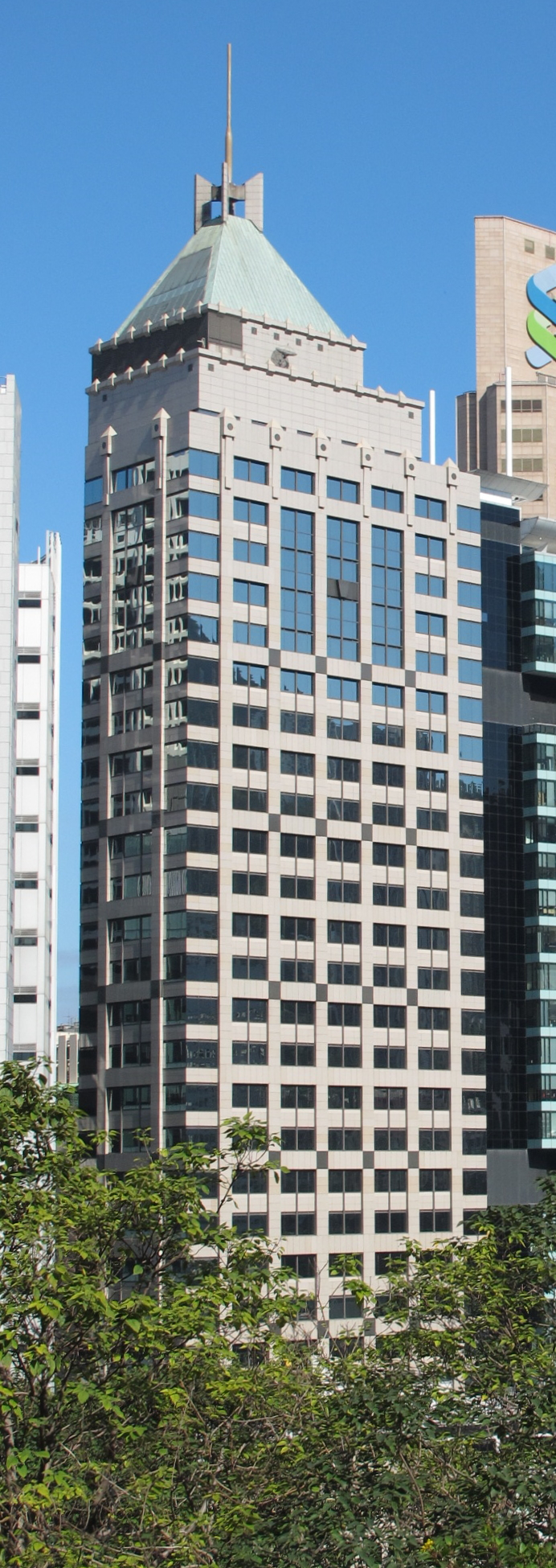
- Nine Queen's Road Central
- Interactive map of the 9 Queen's Road Central area

General information
- Type: Office, retail
- Location: 9 Queen's Road Central, Hong Kong
- Coordinates: 22.280301°N 114.15849°E
- Construction started: 1988
- Completed: 1991
- Opening: October 1991

Height
- Roof: 187 m (614 ft)

Technical details
- Floor count: 39

Design and construction
- Architects: Wong Tung & Partners
- Developer: Hongkong Land
- Structural engineer: Builders Federal
- Main contractor: Gammon Construction Limited

9 Queen's Road Central is a skyscraper located in Central, Hong Kong. The tower rises 39 floors and 187 metres (614 ft) in height. The building was completed in 1991. It was designed by architectural firm Wong Tung & Partners, and was developed by Hongkong Land. 9 Queen's Road Central, which stands as the 80th-tallest building in Hong Kong, is composed almost entirely of commercial office space; the podium which the building rises out of is used for retailing. It is built in Art Deco style.

== See also ==
- List of tallest buildings in Hong Kong
