= Kiu Kwan Mansion =

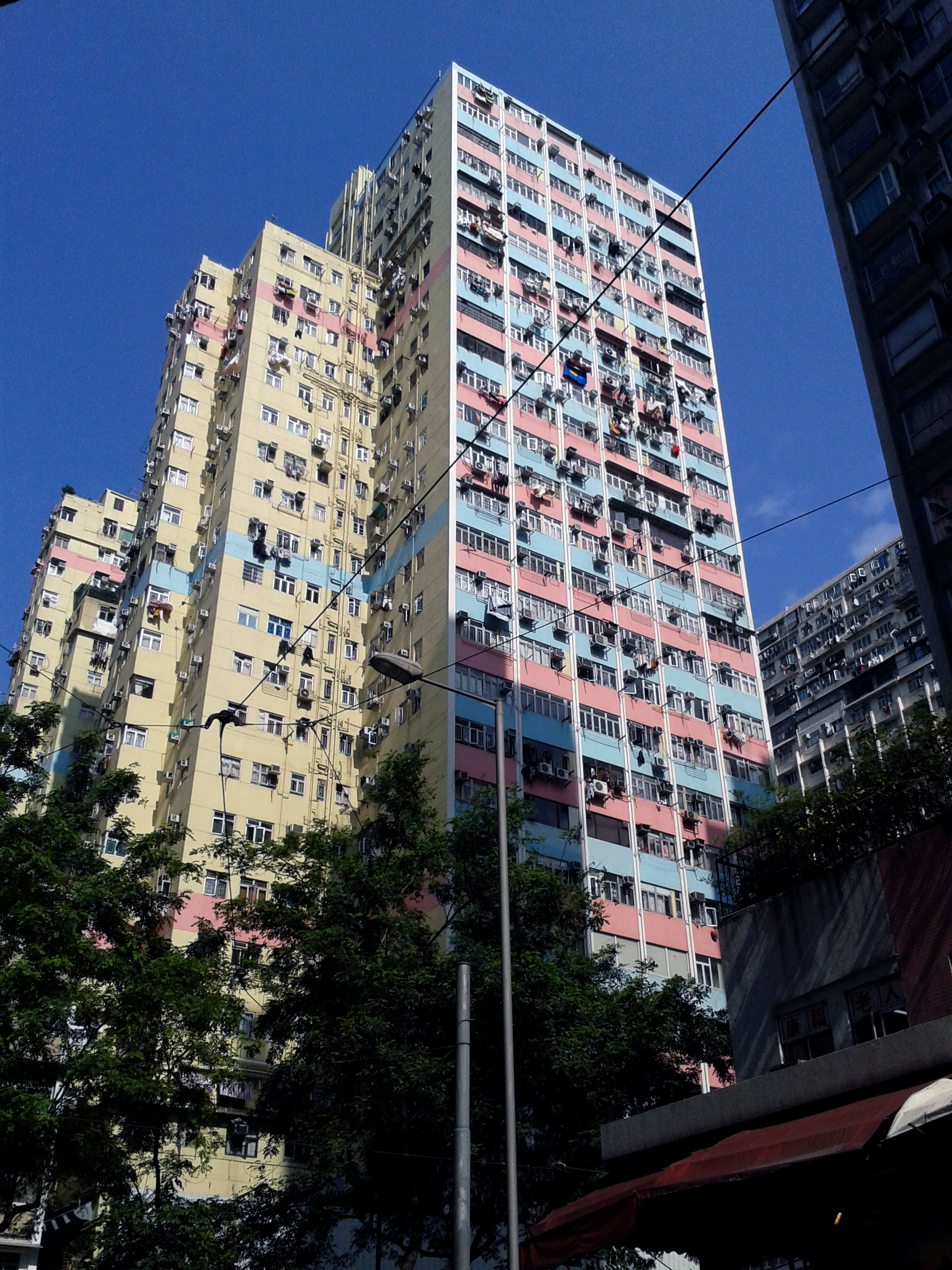
- Interactive map of the Kiu Kwan Mansion area

General information
- Status: Completed
- Type: Residential
- Architectural style: Modernism
- Location: 395 King's Road, North Point; Hong Kong
- Coordinates: 22.2912°N 114.1992°E
- Completed: 5 July 1966; 60 years ago

Height
- Roof: 95 m (312 ft)

Technical details
- Floor count: 27

Design and construction
- Architect: Steven Yue

Other information
- Number of units: 624

Kiu Kwan Mansion (Chinese: 僑冠大廈) is a 27-storey, 95 m (312 ft) residential skyscraper at 395 King's Road, North Point in Hong Kong. When it topped out on 5 July 1966, it was the tallest building in Greater China, surpassing Park Hotel Shanghai, which held the title for 32 years.

The building was designed by Hong Kong architect Steven Yue, There are two blocks altogether containing 624 units originally each between 400 and 600 square feet.

== History ==
Before Kiu Kwan Mansion was built, the site of the building was occupied by the Commercial Press Print-works. Completed in 1934, it was the largest printing house in Hong Kong at the time. Subsequently the company moved its operations back into Mainland China during the 1960s, and the site was redeveloped into Kiu Kwan Mansion in 1966.

In its early days, the building has been associated with leftists involved in the 1967 riots, who used the building as their residence and base of operations. Local media often labeled it and similar buildings as 'leftist buildings' or 'communist strongholds'.

One of the main features of the building is the Wah Fung Chinese Goods Centre founded in 1963, an eclectic emporium of Chinese-made goods, with a Fujian flair, which occupies the ground, first, and second floors of the building. It was one of two Hong Kong branches and the city's largest department store when it opened, and especially attracted many Fujianese and Shanghainese immigrants in the area to shop or find work there.

During the 1967 riots which lasted between May and December of that year, Pro-communist leftists demonstrated against the colonial establishment, leading to 51 people being killed, over 800 people receiving injuries, and over 8,000 bombs being detonated. At the time there was a high concentration of Fujianese in the building and North Point, many of whom who supported the leftists. This led to the building becoming a leftist stronghold, utilizing the labyrinth-like features of the Chinese Goods Centre to deter police crackdowns. Many residents were displaced due to the operations of the leftists.

After police cordoned off the building at 6:40am on 4 August 1967, they began to raid it and the neighboring Metropole Building. Being the largest raid since May, altogether seven companies of riot policemen, seven platoons of British soldiers, a number of plainclothes police officers and three helicopters were deployed. A team containing members of the police and army was dispatched on the building's rooftop by Royal Navy helicopters, while another team accessed the building through the rear stairs of the Chinese Goods Store. Traps with glass bottles, live wires, explosives, and hidden mines of bottled gas bombs lined the staircases and ground floor arcades, while a makeshift watch tower was found in a hidden corner in the staircase.

Some key figures of the leftist movement were arrested during the raid, including Wong Kin-Lap, deputy director of the All-Circles Anti-Persecution Struggle Committee, and headmaster of the leftist school Hon Wah College. And Ng Lun-wah, manager of the Chinese Goods Centre. Despite then being detained at the Victoria Road Detention Centre for 17 months, Wong stated that he had no regrets over his involvement in the 1967 riots.

Kiu Kwan Mansion was refurbished in 1996 and 2007.

== Gallery ==
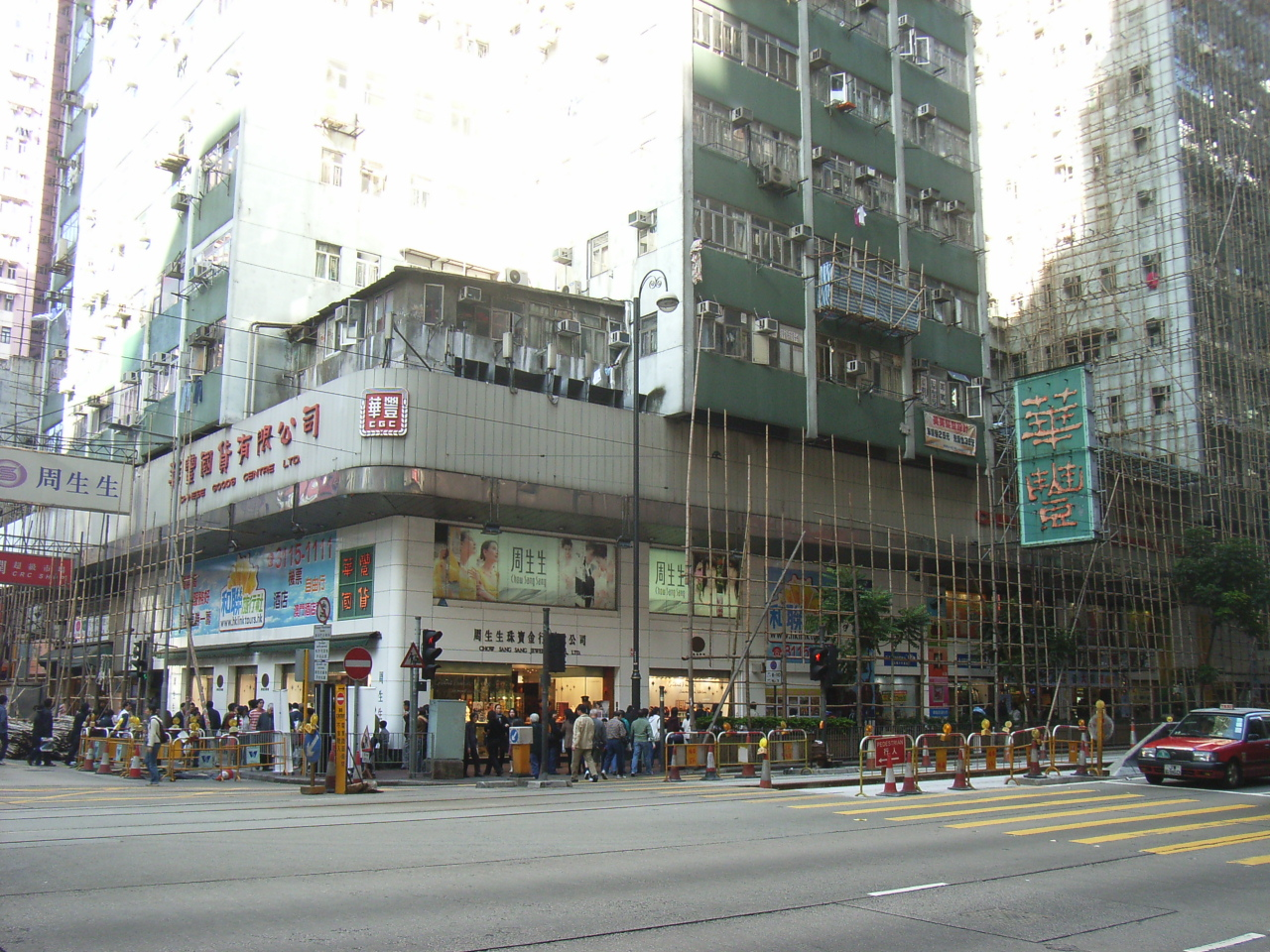

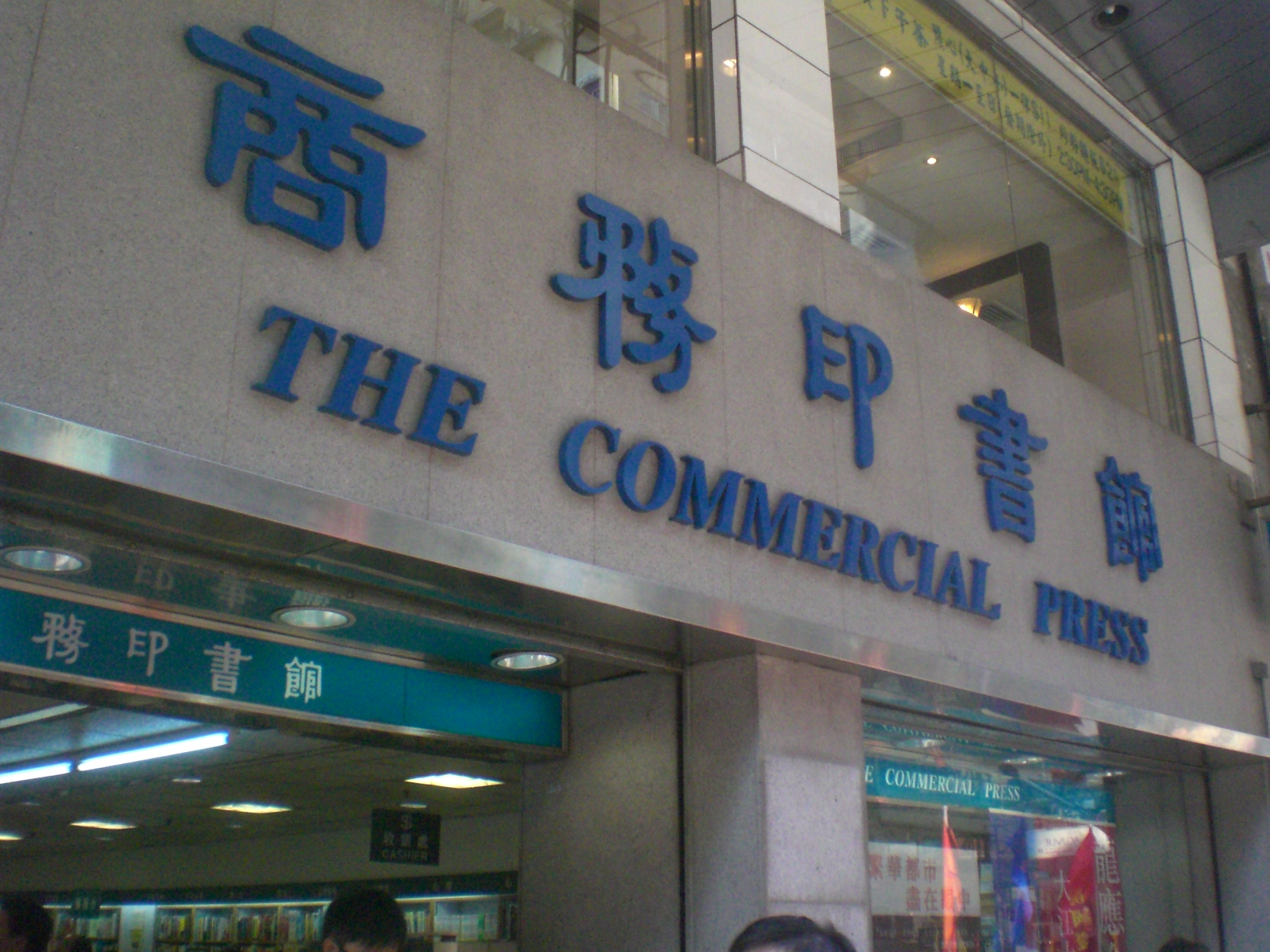

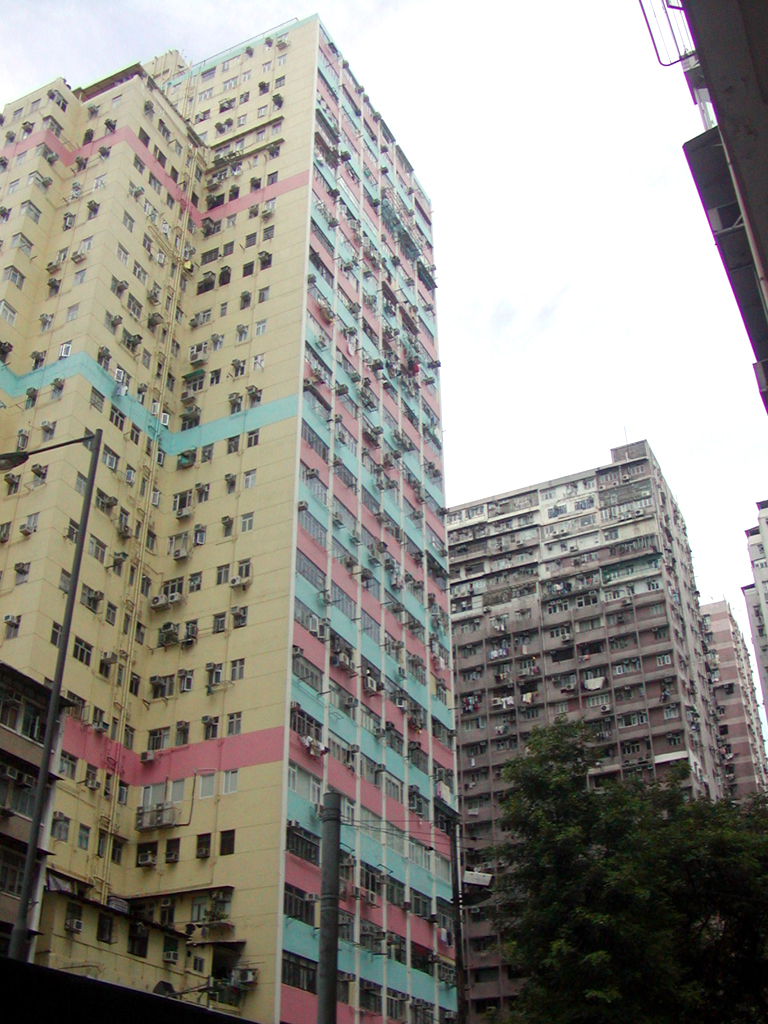

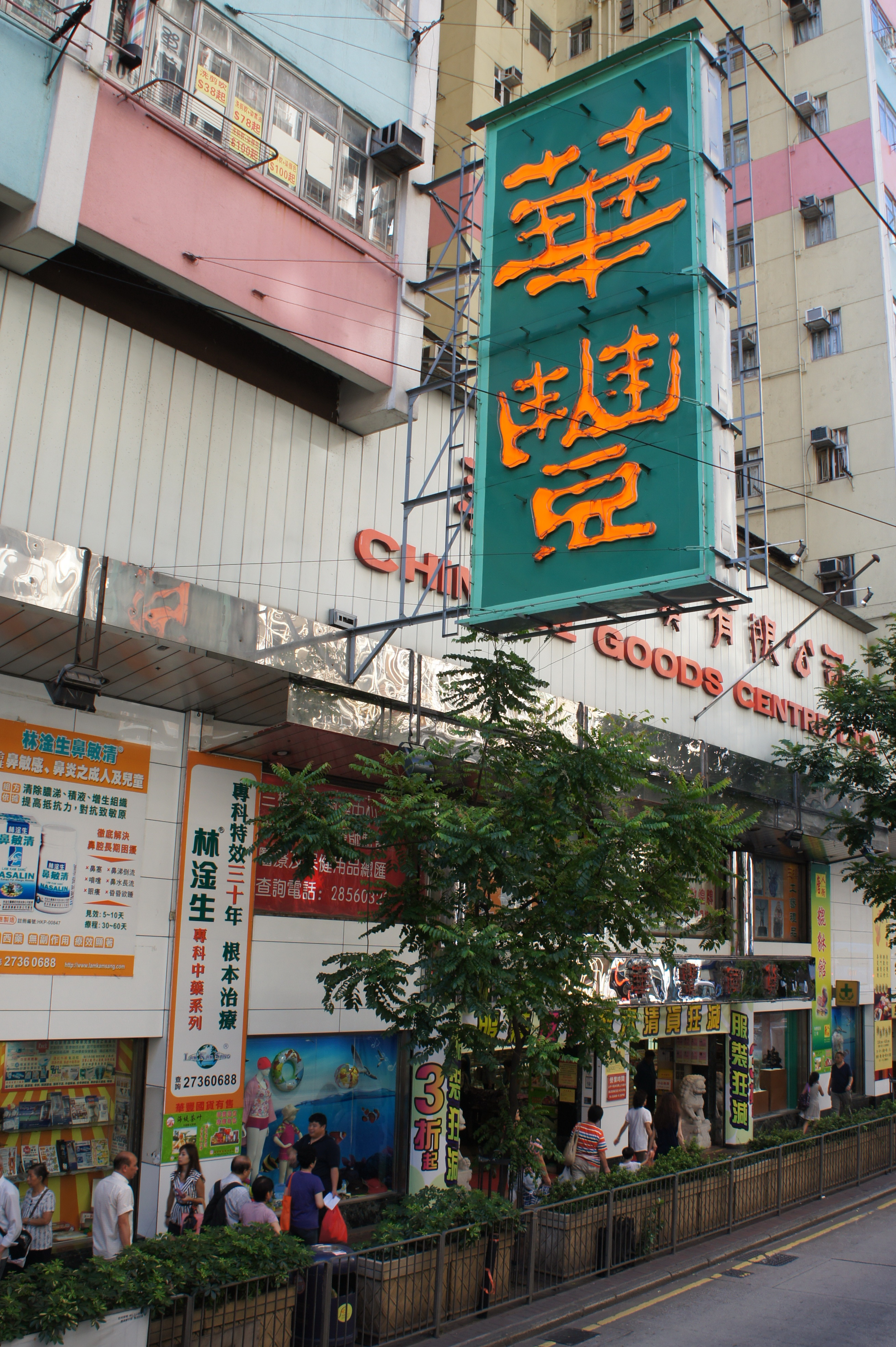

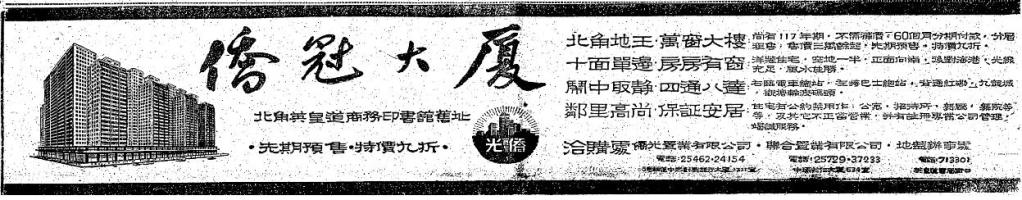

== See also ==
- Timeline of tallest buildings in Hong Kong
