= Victoria Towers =

- 港景峰
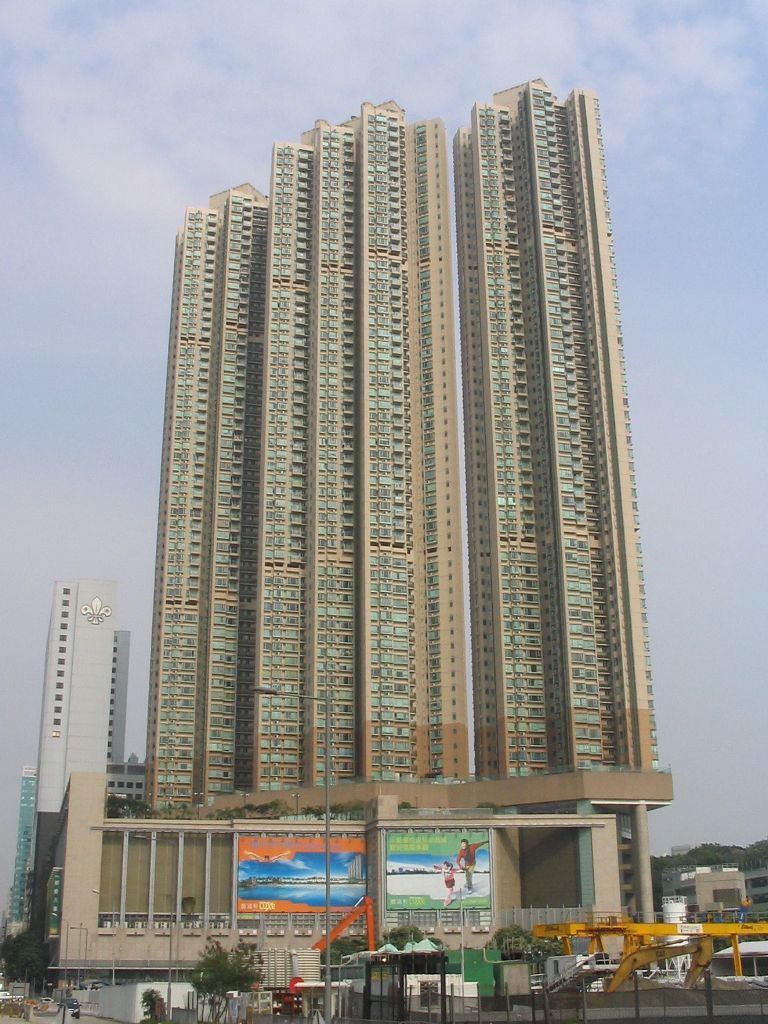
- At the junction of Austin Road and Canton Road
- Interactive map of the Victoria Towers area

General information
- Status: Completed
- Type: Residential
- Location: 188 Canton Road, Tsim Sha Tsui, Hong Kong
- Coordinates: 22.30238°N 114.16848°E
- Opening: 2003; 23 years ago

Height
- Roof: 213 m (699 ft)

Technical details
- Floor count: 62

Design and construction
- Architect: Rocco Design Architects Limited
- Developer: Cheung Kong Holdings, Hutchison Whampoa Properties

The Victoria Towers (Chinese: 港景峰; Jyutping: gong2 ging2 fung1) are a high-rise residential development located in the Tsim Sha Tsui area of Hong Kong. The complex consists of three towers, each rising 62 floors and 213 metres (699 ft) in height.

The complex is located at No.188 Canton Road, at the intersection with Austin Road and was designed by Rocco Design Architects Limited and developed by Cheung Kong Holdings and Hutchison Whampoa Properties. Construction began in 2000 and was completed in 2003. The base of the complex is occupied by the Victoria Mall shopping centre.

== Buildings of the complex ==
Name	Chinese name	Height (m)	Height (ft)	Floor count
Victoria Tower 1	港景峰第一座	213	699	62
Victoria Tower 2	港景峰第二座	213	699	62
Victoria Tower 3	港景峰第三座	213	699	62

== See also ==
- List of tallest buildings in Hong Kong
