= Ap Lei Chau North (constituency) =

Constituency in Hong Kong

- Elected constituency for the Southern District Council
- Boundary of Ap Lei Chau North in Southern District
- District: Southern
- Legislative Council constituency: Hong Kong Island West
- Population: 13,442 (2019)
- Electorate: 6,688 (2019)

Current constituency
- Created: 1991
- Number of members: One
- Member: Vacant

Ap Lei Chau North is one of the 17 constituencies in the Southern District, Hong Kong. The constituency returns one district councillor to the Southern District Council, with an election every four years.

Ap Lei Chau North constituency is loosely based on the northeastern part of Ap Lei Chau including private apartments Marina Habitat and Sham Wan Towers with estimated population of 13,025.

== Councillors represented ==
Election	Member	Party
1991	Yeung Tsui-chun	Nonpartisan
1994	Andrew Cheng Kar-foo	Democratic
1999	Wong King-cheung	Nonpartisan
2005 by-election	Cheung Sik-yung	Nonpartisan
2019	Chan Ping-yeung→Vacant (Note: Resigned on 9 July 2021.)	Democratic

== Election results ==
=== 2010s ===
Southern District Council Election, 2019: Ap Lei Chau North
Party	Candidate	Votes	%	±%
Democratic	Chan Ping-yeung	3,136	61.88	
Independent	Sandy Cheung Sik-yung	1,932	38.12	−29.21
Majority		1.204	23.76	
Turnout		5,092	76.36	
Democratic gain from Independent		Swing		

Southern District Council Election, 2015: Ap Lei Chau North
Party	Candidate	Votes	%	±%
Nonpartisan	Sandy Cheung Sik-yung	1,556	67.33	+2.85
Nonpartisan	Leung Kwok-keung	755	32.67	
Majority		801	34.66	
Turnout		2,311	38.26	
Nonpartisan hold		Swing		

Southern District Council Election, 2011: Ap Lei Chau North
Party	Candidate	Votes	%	±%
Nonpartisan	Sandy Cheung Sik-yung	1,527	64.48	+17.67
Nonpartisan	Cheung Wing-ho	841	35.52	
Majority		687	28.95	
Liberal hold		Swing		

=== 2000s ===
Southern District Council Election, 2007: Ap Lei Chau North
Party	Candidate	Votes	%	±%
Nonpartisan	Sandy Cheung Sik-yung	1,752	46.81	+15.48
Nonpartisan	Chiu Kwing-shing	1,341	35.63	+4.30
Nonpartisan	Kwan Yiu-wing	671	17.83	
Majority		411	11.18	
Liberal hold		Swing		

Ap Lei Chau North by-election 2005
Party	Candidate	Votes	%	±%
Nonpartisan	Sandy Cheung Sik-yung	702	31.33	
Nonpartisan	Chiu Kwing-shing	702	31.33	
Democratic	Wan Kam-cheung	491	21.91	
Liberal	Ng Ting-kit	321	14.32	
Nonpartisan	Petrus Chan Ting-wing	25	1.12	
Majority		0	0.00	
Nonpartisan gain from Nonpartisan		Swing		

Southern District Council Election, 2003: Ap Lei Chau North
Party	Candidate	Votes	%	±%
Nonpartisan	Wong King-cheung	2,526	88.76	
DAB	Simon Chow Kam-keung	320	11.24	
Majority		2,206	77.52	
Nonpartisan hold		Swing		

=== 1990s ===
Southern District Council Election, 1999: Ap Lei Chau North
Party	Candidate	Votes	%	±%
Nonpartisan	Wong King-cheung	Uncontested		
Nonpartisan gain from Democratic		Swing		

Southern District Board Election, 1994: Ap Lei Chau North
Party	Candidate	Votes	%	±%
Democratic	Andrew Cheng Kar-foo	1,630	46.45	
Public Affairs Society	Vivian Chih Wan-wan	1,454	41.44	
DAB	Leung Pak-hung	425	12.11	
Majority		176	6.01	
Democratic gain from Nonpartisan		Swing		

Southern District Board Election, 1991: Ap Lei Chau North
Party	Candidate	Votes	%	±%
Nonpartisan	Yeung Tsui-chun	2,247	61.36	
LDF	Yuen Sau-hung	1,415	38.64	
Majority		832	22.72	
Nonpartisan win (new seat)				
