= Aigburth (Hong Kong) =

Building in Hong Kong, China

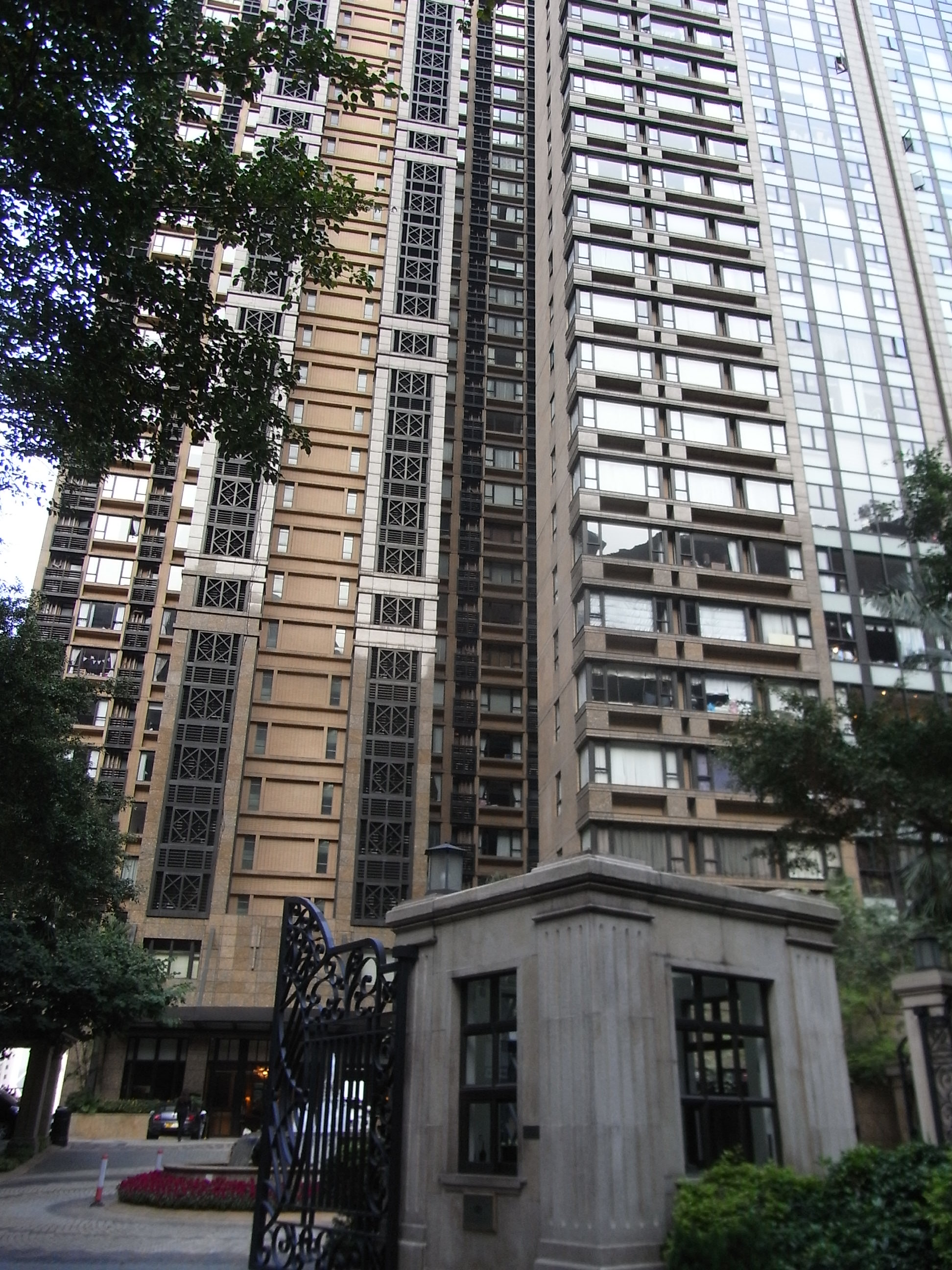
- Interactive map of the Aigburth area

General information
- Type: Residential
- Location: 12 Tregunter Path, Mid-levels, Hong Kong
- Coordinates: 22.27353°N 114.15305°E
- Construction started: 1997
- Completed: 1999
- Opening: 1999

Height
- Roof: 196 m (643 ft)

Technical details
- Floor count: 48

Design and construction
- Architects: Wong Tung & Partners
- Developer: Kerry Properties Limited

The Aigburth (Chinese: 譽皇居) is a skyscraper located in the Mid-levels district of Hong Kong. The tower rises 48 floors and 196 metres (643 ft) in height. The building was fully constructed in 1999. It was designed by the architectural firm Wong Tung & Partners, and was developed by Kerry Properties Limited. The Aigburth, which stands as the 66th-tallest building in Hong Kong, is composed entirely of residential units, and is an example of postmodern architecture.

== See also ==
- List of tallest buildings in Hong Kong
