= Tsuen Wan South (constituency) =

- 荃灣南
- Elected constituency for the Tsuen Wan District Council
- Boundary of Tsuen Wan South in Tsuen Wan District
- District: Tsuen Wan
- Legislative Council constituency: New Territories South West
- Population: 19,623 (2019)
- Electorate: 7,808 (2019)

Current constituency
- Created: 2019
- Number of members: One
- Member: Antonio Luk Ling-chung (Independent)
- Created from: Tak Wah, Tsuen Wan West, Yeung Uk Road

Tsuen Wan South (Chinese: 荃灣南) is one of the 19 constituencies in the Tsuen Wan District.

Created for the 2019 District Council elections, the constituency returns one district councillor to the Tsuen Wan District Council, with an election every four years.

Tsuen Wan South loosely covers residential areas including Chelsea Court, City Point, Indi Home, The Blue Yard, The Dynasty and Vision City in Tsuen Wan. It has projected population of 19,623.

== Councillors represented ==
Election	Member	Party
2019	Antonio Luk Ling-chung	Civic→Independent

== Election results ==
=== 2010s ===
Tsuen Wan District Council Election, 2019: Tsuen Wan South
Party	Candidate	Votes	%	±%
Civic	Antonio Luk Ling-chung	3,261	54.34	
DAB	William Chan Kit	1,860	30.99	
Roundtable	Ma Ting-hei	880	14.66	
Majority		1,401	23.35	
Turnout		6,011	77.00	
Civic win (new seat)				
