= The Centrium =

Office building in Central, Hong Kong

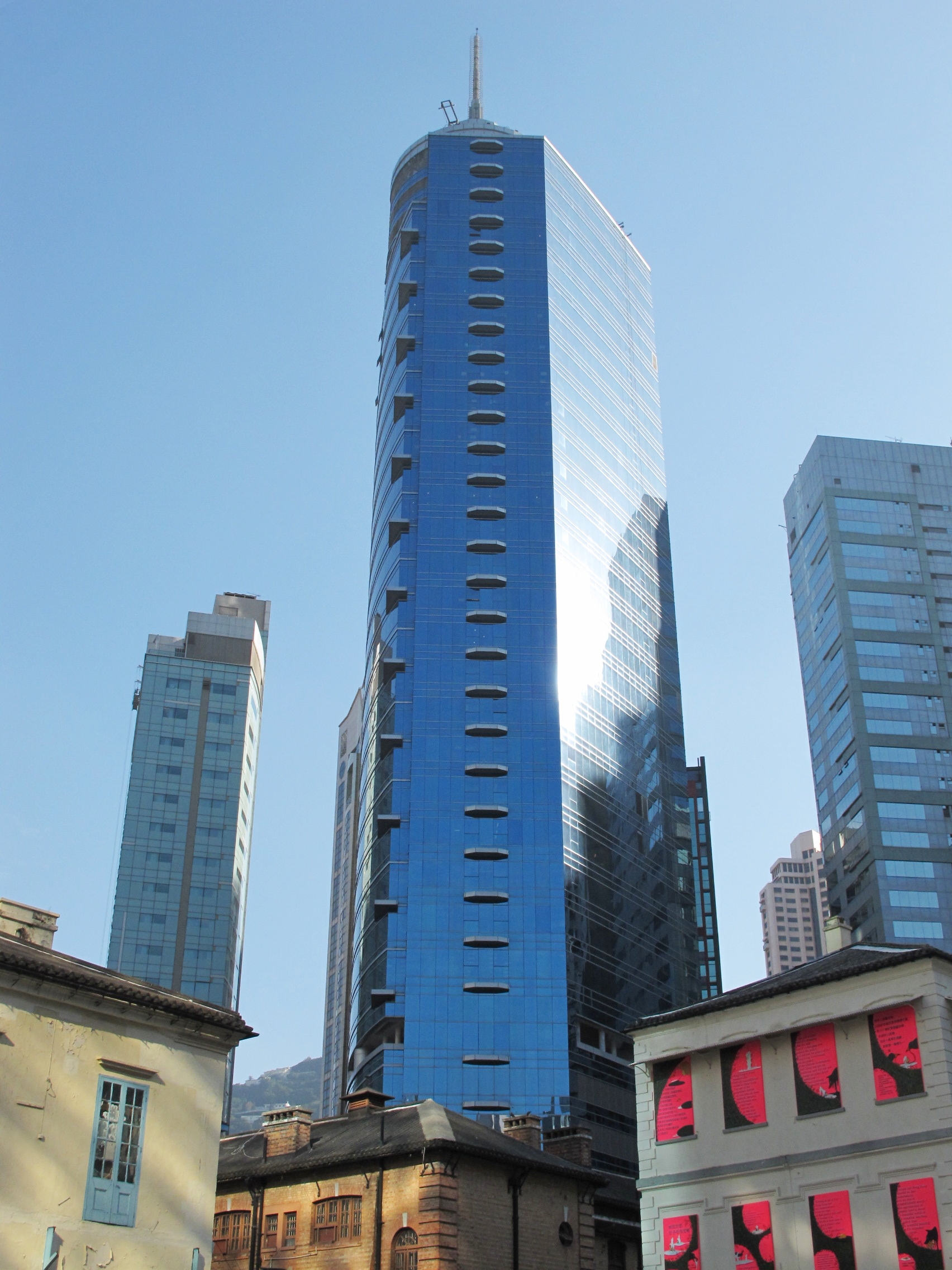
- The Centrium (2010)

General information
- Type: Office, retail
- Location: 60 Wyndham Street, Central, Hong Kong
- Coordinates: 22.28071°N 114.15469°E
- Construction started: 1999; 27 years ago
- Completed: 2001; 25 years ago
- Opening: 2001; 25 years ago

Height
- Roof: 189 m (620 ft)

Technical details
- Floor area: 23,775 m^{2} (255,900 sq ft)

Design and construction
- Architect: DP Architects
- Developer: Sino Group Limited

The Centrium (Chinese: 中央廣場) is a skyscraper located in the Central district of Hong Kong. The tower rises 41 floors and 189 metres (620 ft) in height. The building was completed in 2001. It was designed by architectural firm DP Architects, and was developed by the Sino Group Limited. The Centrium, which stands as the 75th-tallest building in Hong Kong, is composed almost entirely of commercial office space; the lowermost floors are used for retailing. It has a total floor area of 23,775 square metres (255,900 sq ft). A spire was added to the building in 2002, one year after its initial completion; the spire lights up in various colors at night.

The Centrium stands at 60 Wyndham Street, in the heart of Hong Kong's Lan Kwai Fong and Soho bar and restaurant district, close to shopping malls and international luxury hotels. Its tenants include legal, financial and consultancy firms. The Landmark shopping centre and the Lan Kwai Fong Hotel are among the nearby amenities named by the leasing agent JLL, which lists Central MTR station as the nearest station and notes that the airport rail link at Hong Kong Station is about 20 minutes away.

== Architecture ==
The podium has a shop frontage of about 130 feet (39.6 m). Reports describe the building as housing 25 floors of offices and six floors of car park, and as combining commercial, entertainment and cultural elements with nearby restaurants and bars such as Bungalow, Dragon-i, Solas and Wagyu. Leasing listings for the tower describe a curtain-wall design, a spacious layout, a six-storey car park, professional property management and 24-hour security. JLL lists six passenger lifts and one cargo lift, and in-house parking. Listings also describe the tower as close to both the busy Soho neighbourhood and a quieter urban oasis, with fitted offices that offer city views from the middle and lower floors.

== See also ==
- List of tallest buildings in Hong Kong
- The Center
