= Metro Harbour View =

Private housing estate in Hong Kong

Coordinates: 22.3246°N 114.1605°E

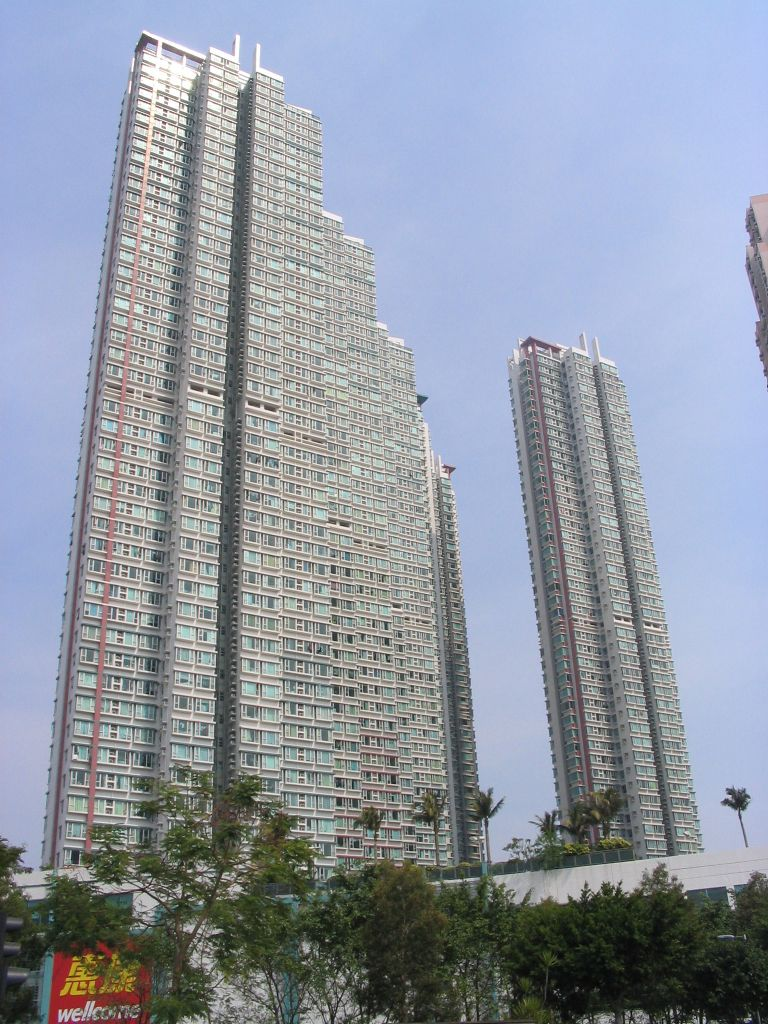
Metro Harbour View

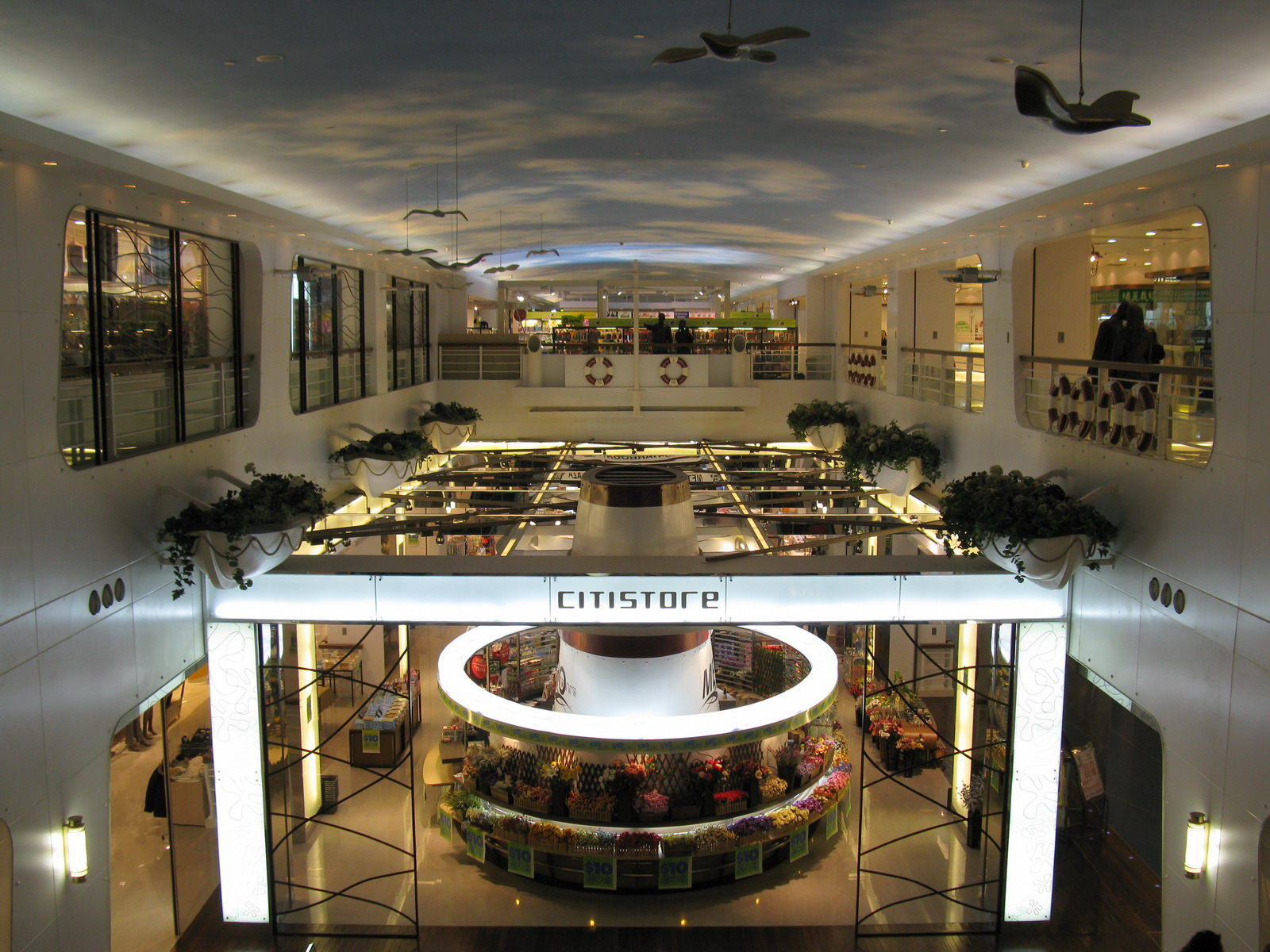
Citistore inside Metro Harbour View shopping arcade(closed)

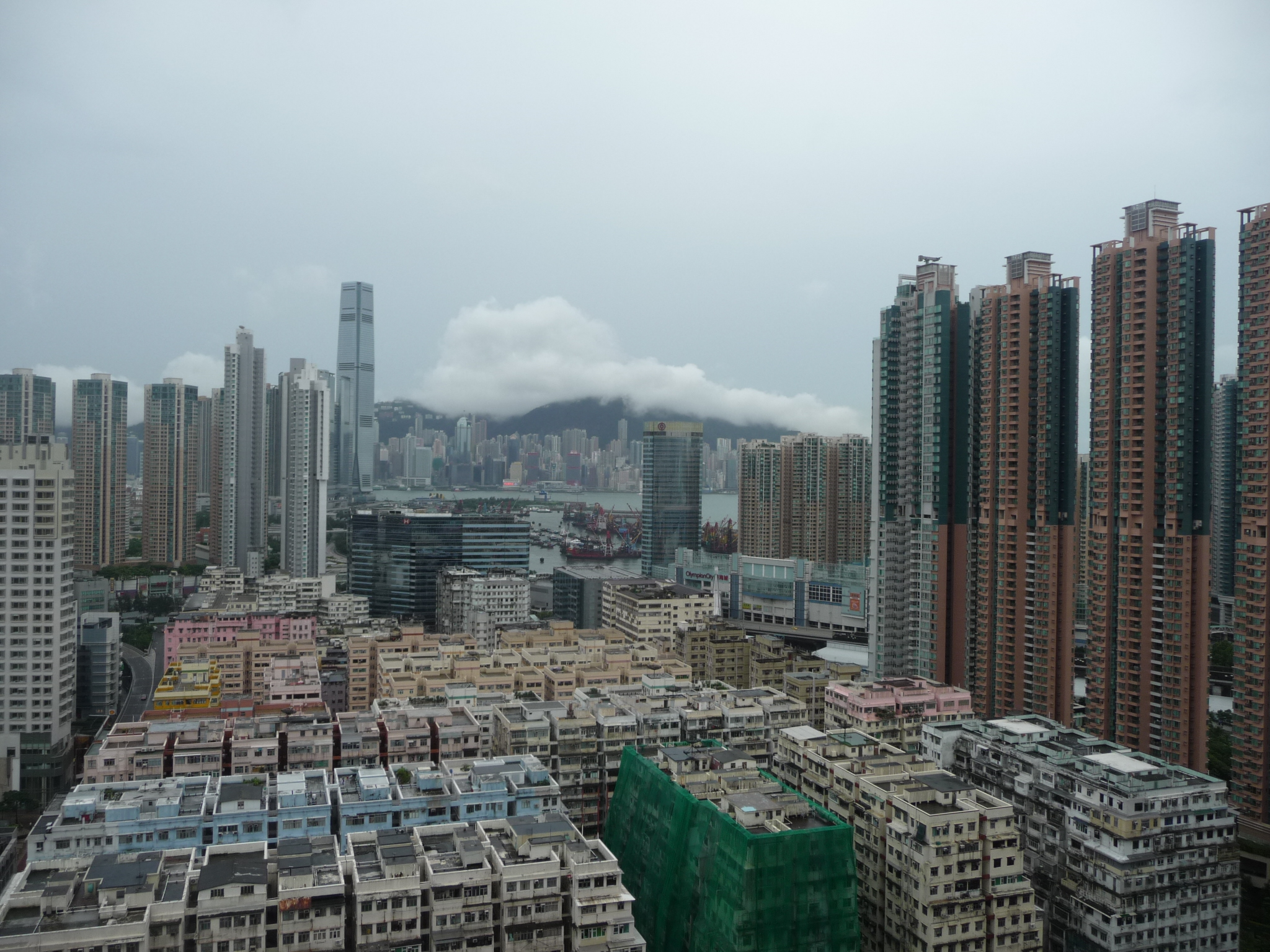
View from 30th floor

Metro Harbour View (Chinese: 港灣豪庭; Jyutping: gong2 waan1 hou4 ting4) is a private housing estate at the intersection of Tai Kok Tsui Road (Chinese: 大角咀道) and Fuk Lee Street (Chinese: 福利街) in Tai Kok Tsui, Kowloon, Hong Kong, within walking distance to the MTR Olympic station.

Formerly the Yaumati Ferry shipyard and HYFCO Industrial Building in Tai Kok Tsui, it was jointly developed by Henderson Land Development and Hong Kong Ferry (Holdings) Company Limited in 2003. The development consists of 10 blocks of residential buildings into 2 phases, divided into 3,520 residential units, plus a 2-storey commercial arcade and about 1,100 car parking spaces.

== Demographics ==
According to the 2016 by-census, Metro Harbour View had a population of 8,954. The median age was 39 and the majority of residents (91.1 per cent) were of Chinese ethnicity. The average household size was 2.7 people. The median monthly household income of all households (i.e. including both economically active and inactive households) was HK$46,990.

== Politics ==
Metro Harbour View is located in Tai Kok Tsui North constituency of the Yau Tsim Mong District Council. It was formerly represented by Owan Li, who was elected in the 2019 elections until July 2021.

== Education ==
Metro Harbour View is in Primary One Admission (POA) School Net 32. Within the school net are multiple aided schools (operated independently but funded with government money) and Tong Mei Road Government Primary School (塘尾道官立小學).
