= Vision City (Hong Kong) =

Building complex in Tsuen Wan, Hong Kong

Coordinates: 22.3703°N 114.114°E

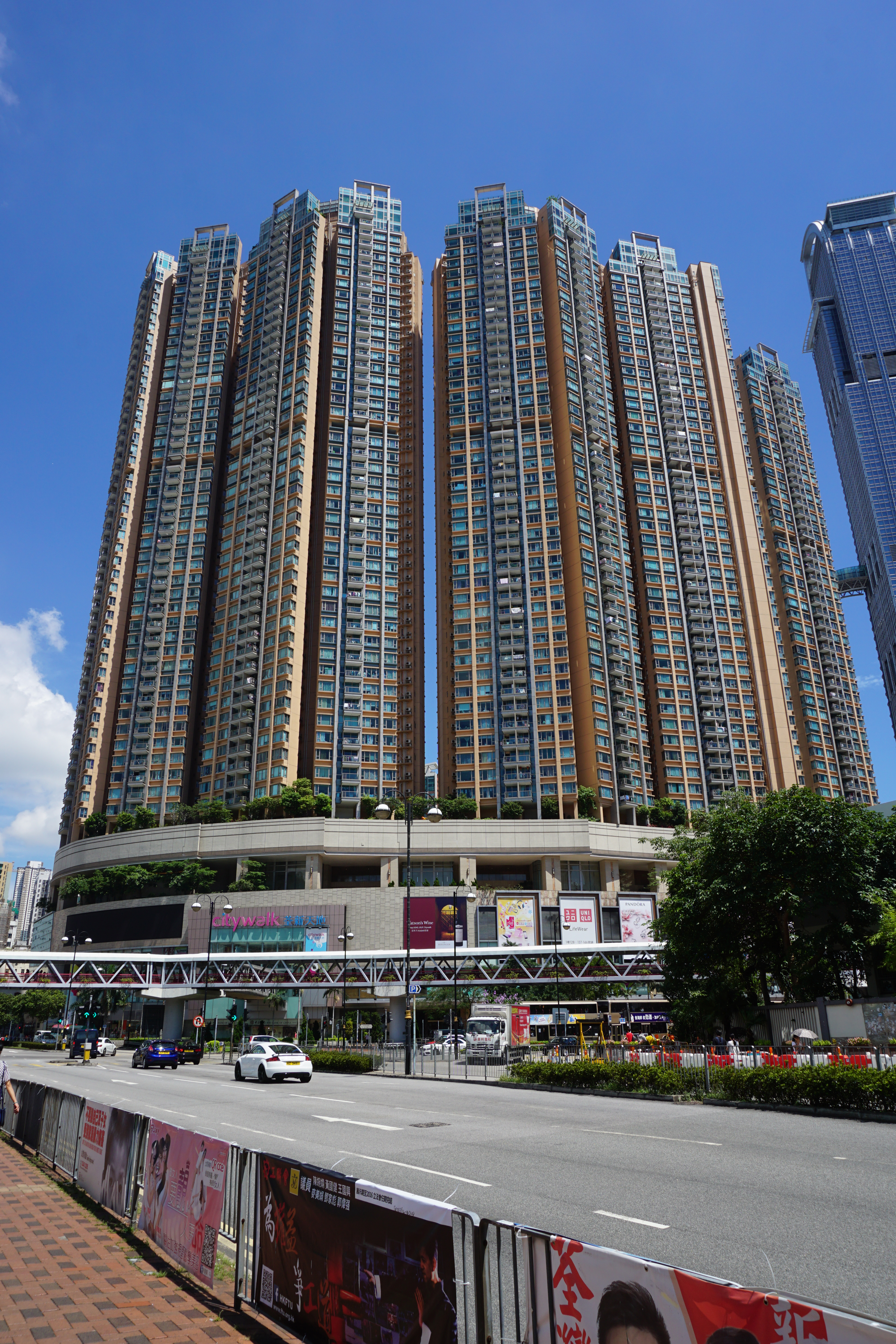
Vision City

Vision City (Chinese: 萬景峯) is a residential high-rise development located in the Tsuen Wan district of the New Territories in Hong Kong. The complex consists of five towers, each of which ranks among the tallest buildings in the city. The tallest buildings in the complex are Vision City 2 and Vision City 3, which both rise 195 metres (640 ft) and 52 floors. The towers are tied as the 67th-tallest buildings in Hong Kong. Towers 1 and 5 rise 192 metres (630 ft) and 52 floors, standing as the 70th-tallest buildings in the city. Tower 6 rises 50 floors and 183 metres (600 ft) high, and is the city's 90th-tallest building. The entire complex was completed in 2007. The five towers, composed entirely of residential units, rise out of a common podium that is used for retail space. Vision City contains 1,446 condominiums and 138,000 square metres (1,490,000 sq ft) of floor area.

== Demographics ==
According to the 2016 by-census, Vision City had a population of 4,472. The median age was 40.6 and the majority of residents (90.6 per cent) were of Chinese ethnicity. The average household size was 3.2 people. The median monthly household income of all households (i.e. including both economically active and inactive households) was HK$60,650.

== Politics ==
Vision City is located in Tsuen Wan South constituency of the Tsuen Wan District Council. It is currently represented by Antonio Luk Ling-chung, who was elected in the 2019 elections.

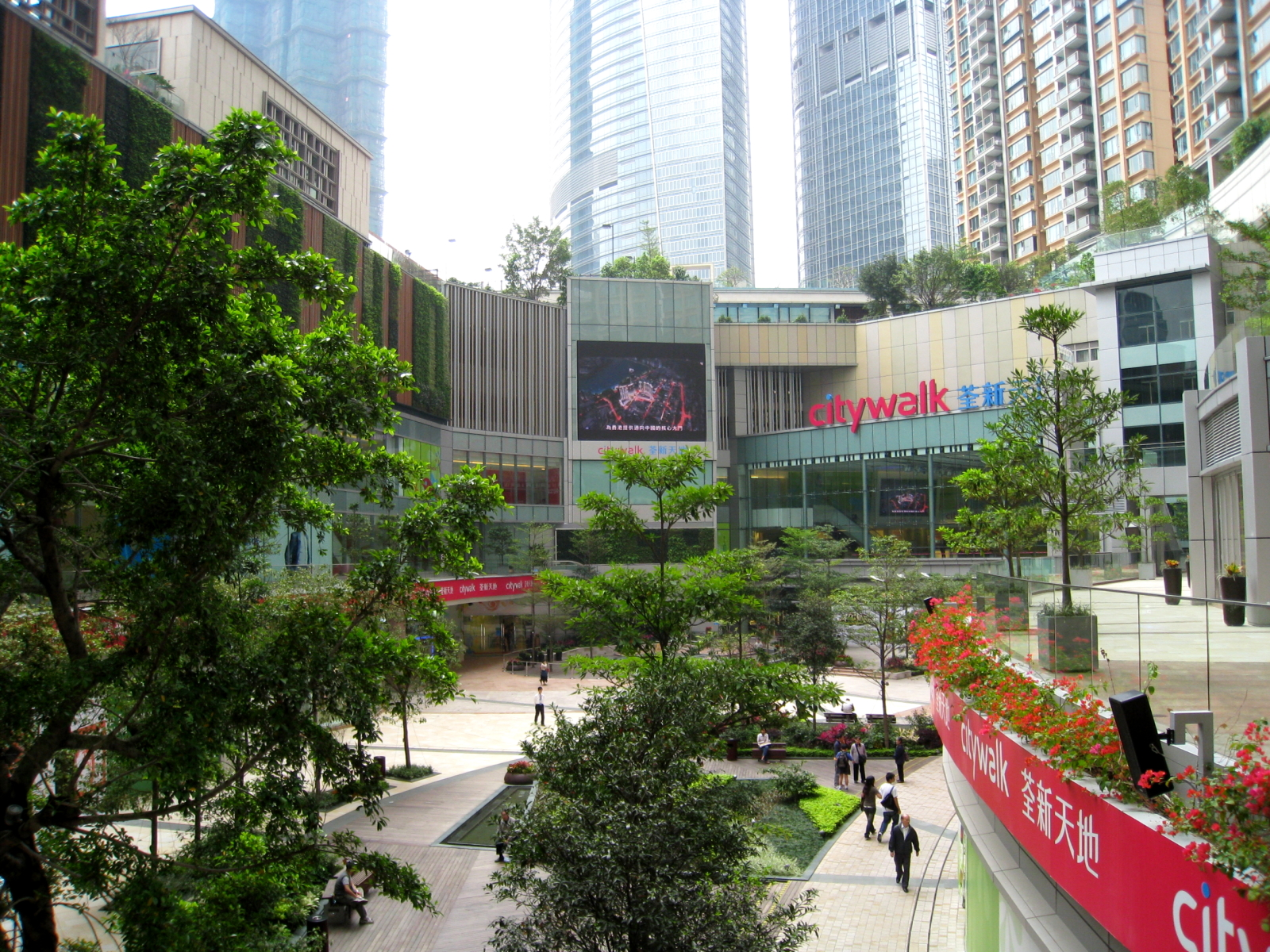
Citywalk Shopping Mall

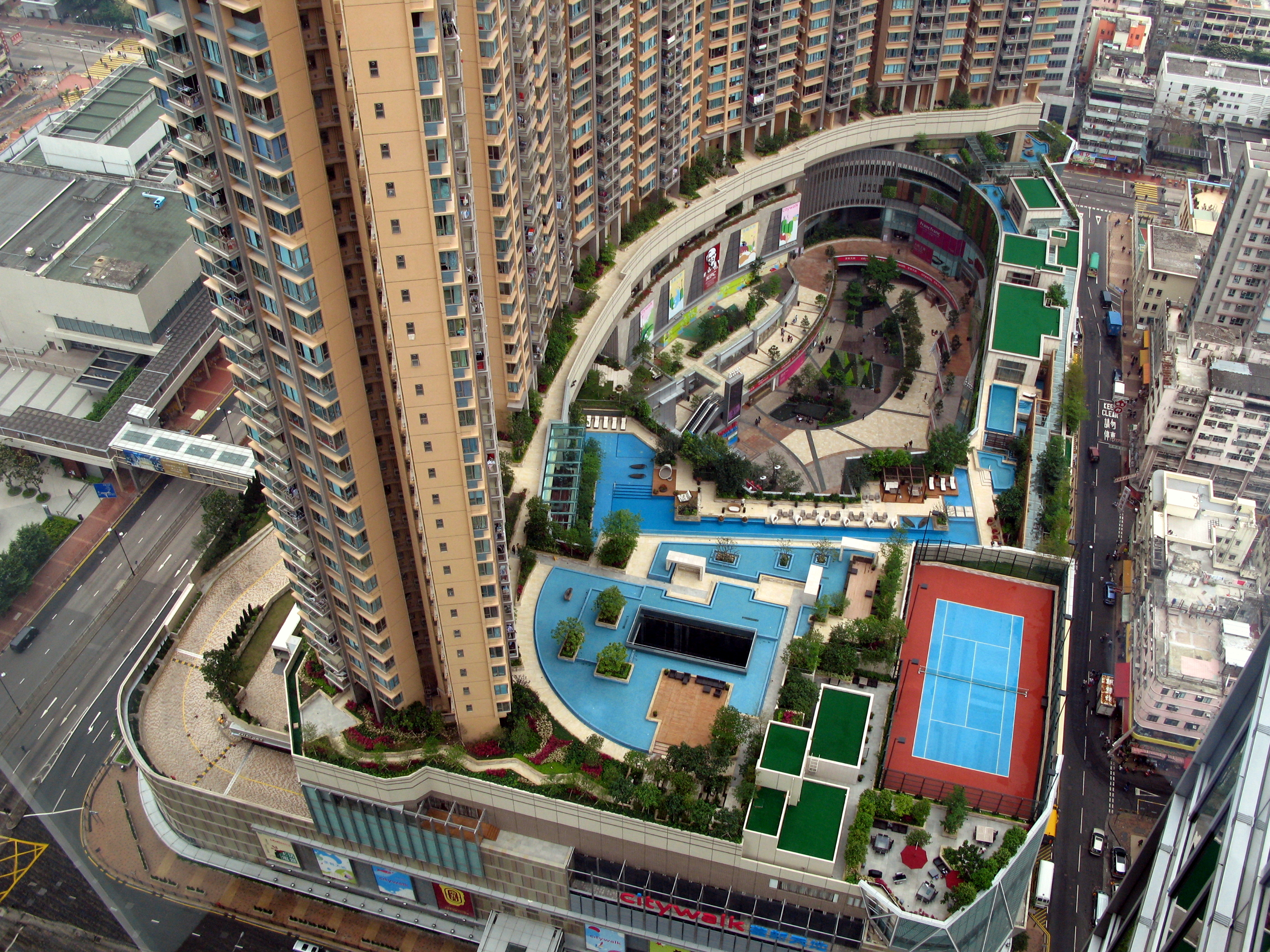
Vision City Phase 1 Garden

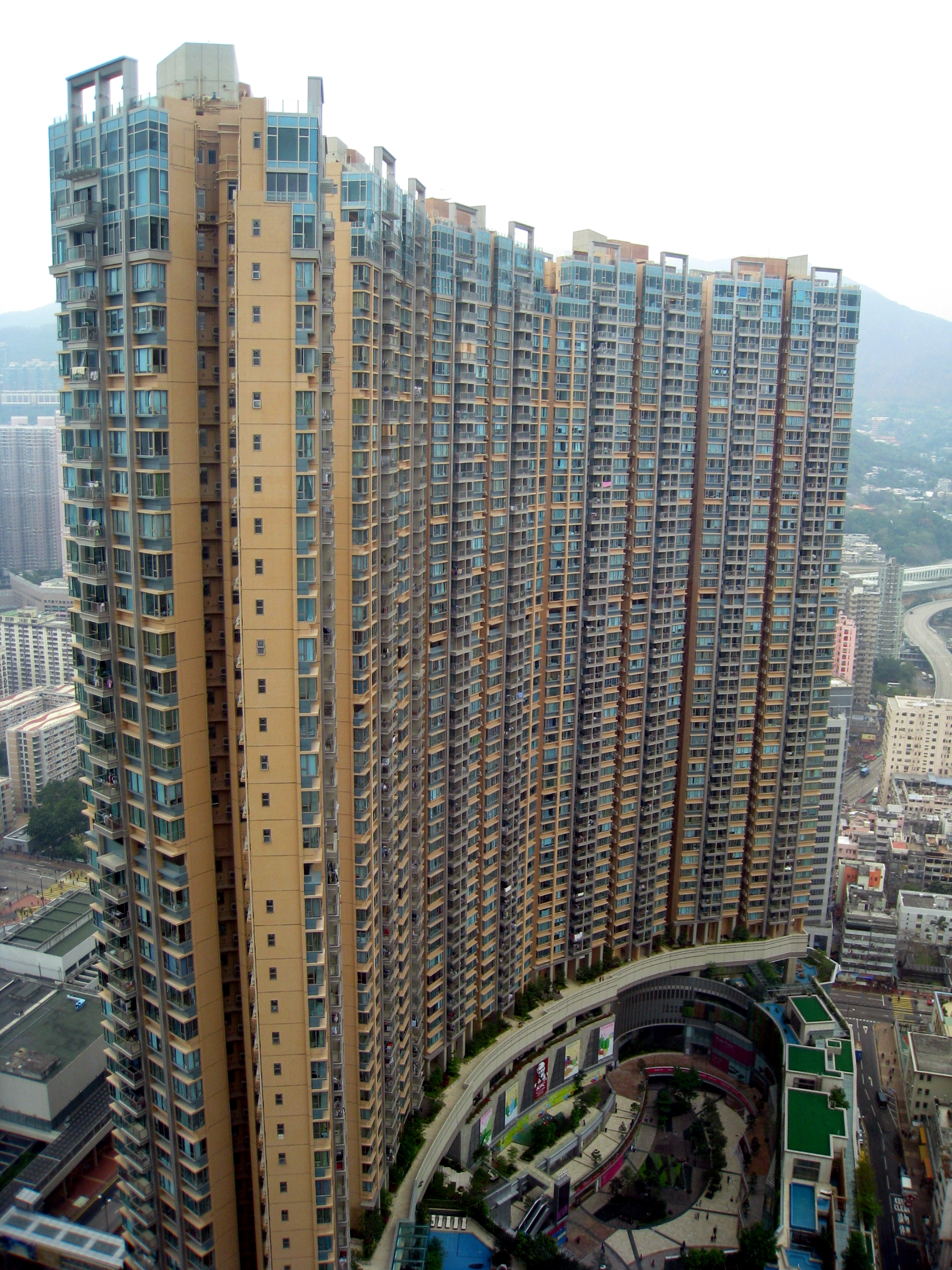
Vision City Phase 1 view

== See also ==
- List of tallest buildings in Hong Kong

== Others ==
- Citywalk, Hong Kong, a shopping centre located beneath Vision City
