= Vision City (Rwanda) =

Vision City is multi-phase housing development in Kigali, Rwanda currently being built by Ultimate Developers LTD for the Rwanda Social Security Board. At 4500 units and a total cost of 150 million USD it is the largest residential housing project in the country's history. The first 500 units were completed in 2017.

== History ==
In 2011, Ultimate Develops formed and the same year announced Vision City to be their first project. The project, which is being financed by the Rwanda Social Security Board(RSSB), is designed to be built in 4 phases over 8 years and provide housing for 22,000 people. The project is located in Gaculiro, Kinyiya sector in Kigali's Gasabo District. The tract of land for the entire project is 158 hectares. Before work could begin, 3000 residents were relocated, some of whom had to be forcibly removed.

Work began on the project in November 2013. The first phase consists of 504 units aimed at high-income earners. This has caused some criticism due to the Kigali's need for low-income housing. After missing the original completion date of mid-August 2016, the first phase was finished by July 2017 with around 30% initial occupancy. Shortly after completion of phase one, the developers dramatically reduced prices on all units, citing cost savings due to government incentives and infrastructure support.

According to the developers, the next planned construction phase is a "Town Centre" including of stores, restaurants, banking, and educational services.
