= Chung Wui Mansion =

Building in Hong Kong

Coordinates: 22°16′36.7″N 114°10′31.8″E

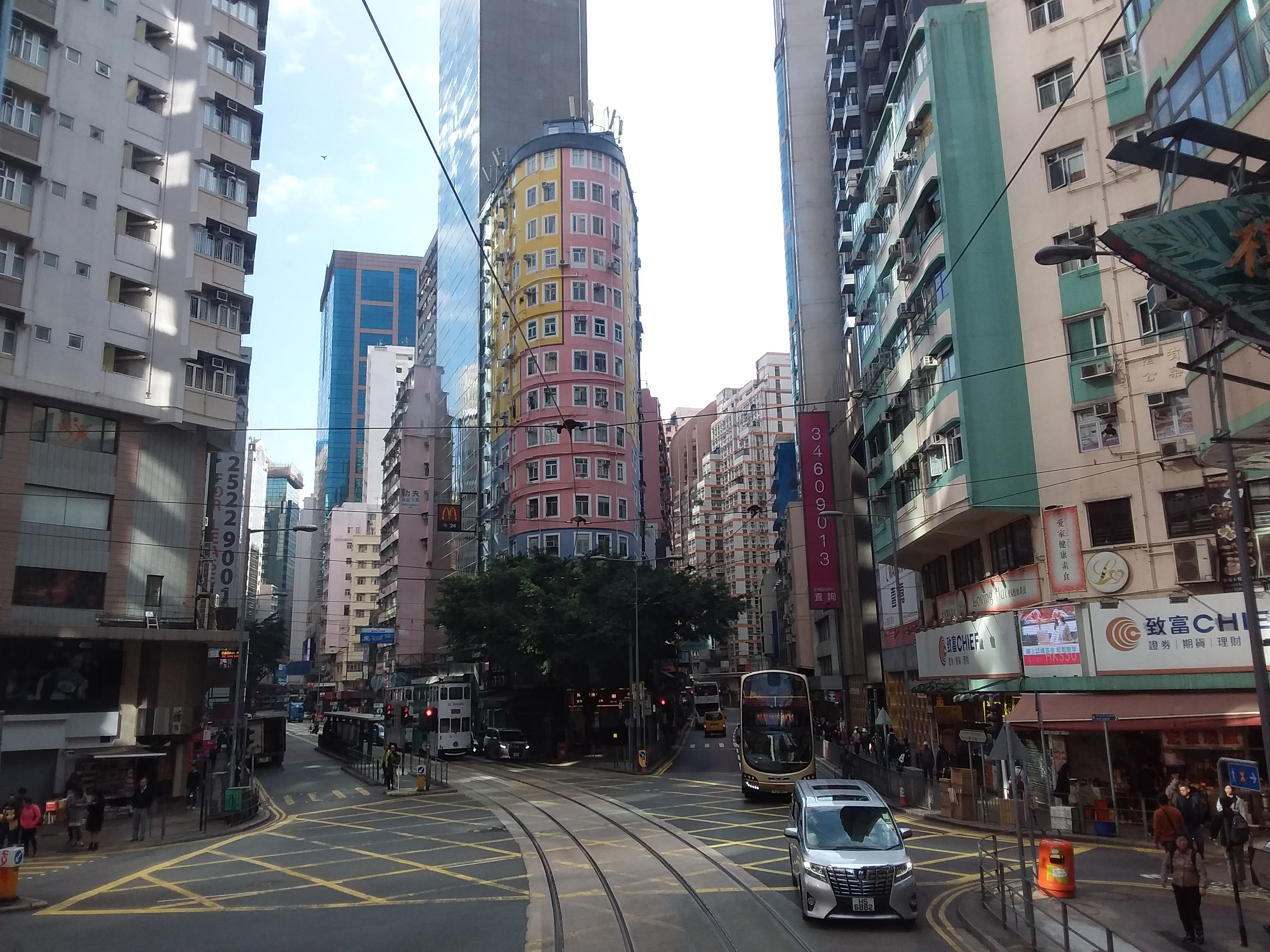
Chung Wui Mansion

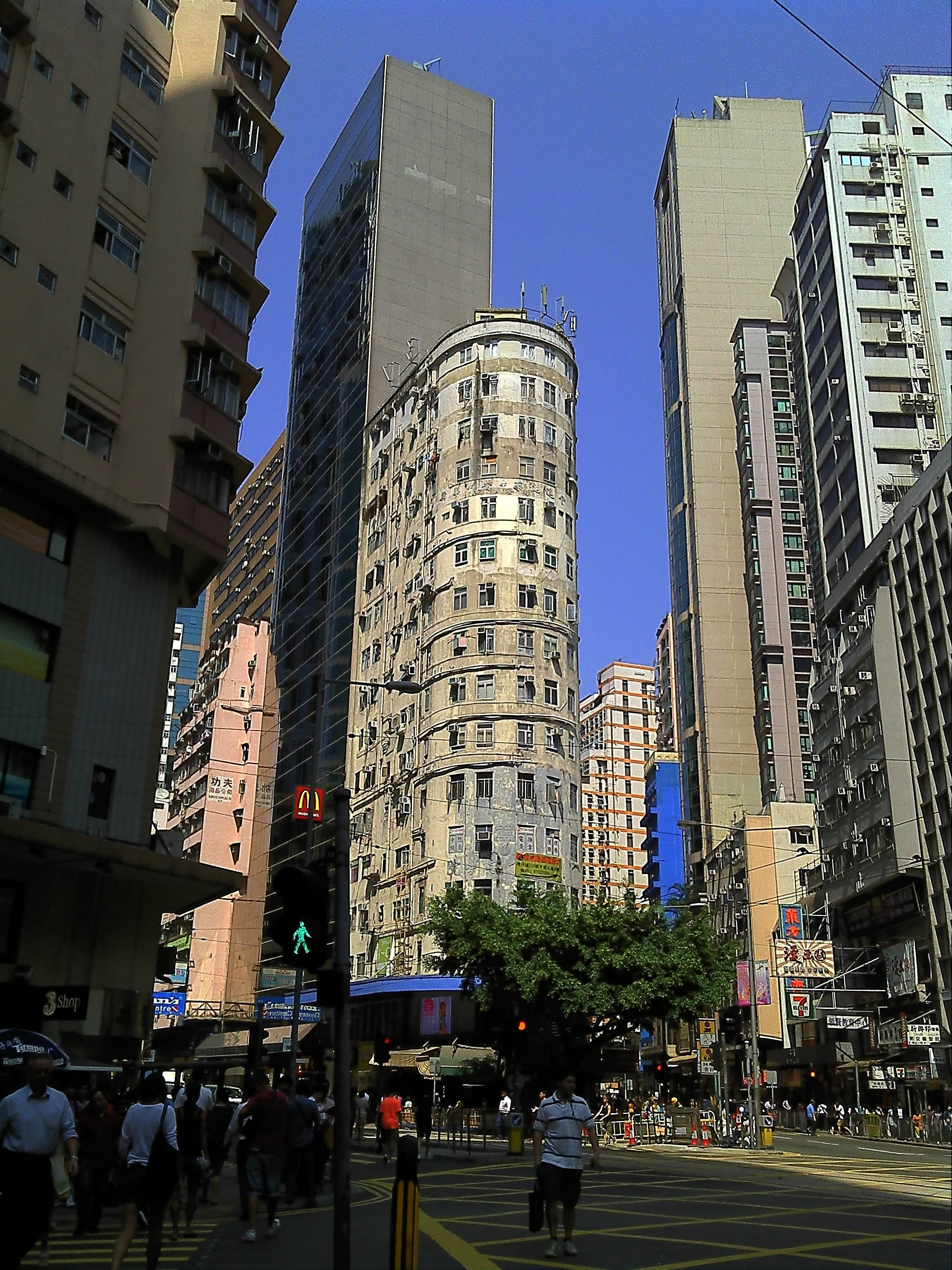
Chung Wui Mansion in 2011. (Pre-renovation)

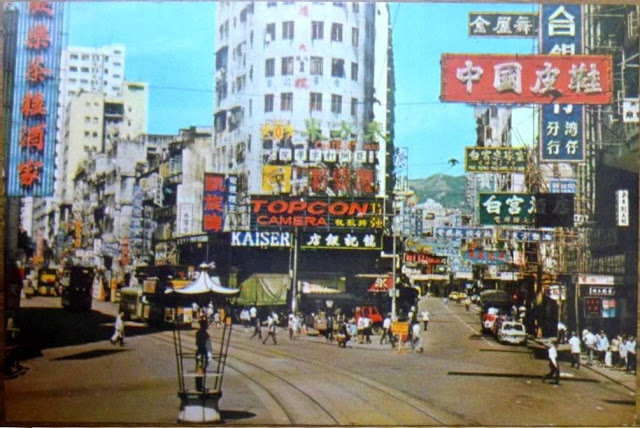
Chung Wui Mansion in the 1960s.

Chung Wui Mansion (Chinese: 中匯大樓) is a composite building in Wan Chai District, Hong Kong. Its address is 76A-176D Johnston Road. It was completed in 1964.

== Characteristics ==
- Floor Count: 16
- Completed: 1964
- Architect: Ping K. Ng
- Type: Composite building
- Use: Residential, commercial, and industrial
- Corner Type: Rounded, making it a corner building.
- Architecture: 20th-century modern architecture

== See also ==
- Corner Houses
- Composite Building
- Modern Architecture
