= 14 Nam Cheong Street =

Building in Hong Kong

Coordinates: 22.326346°N 114.160974°E

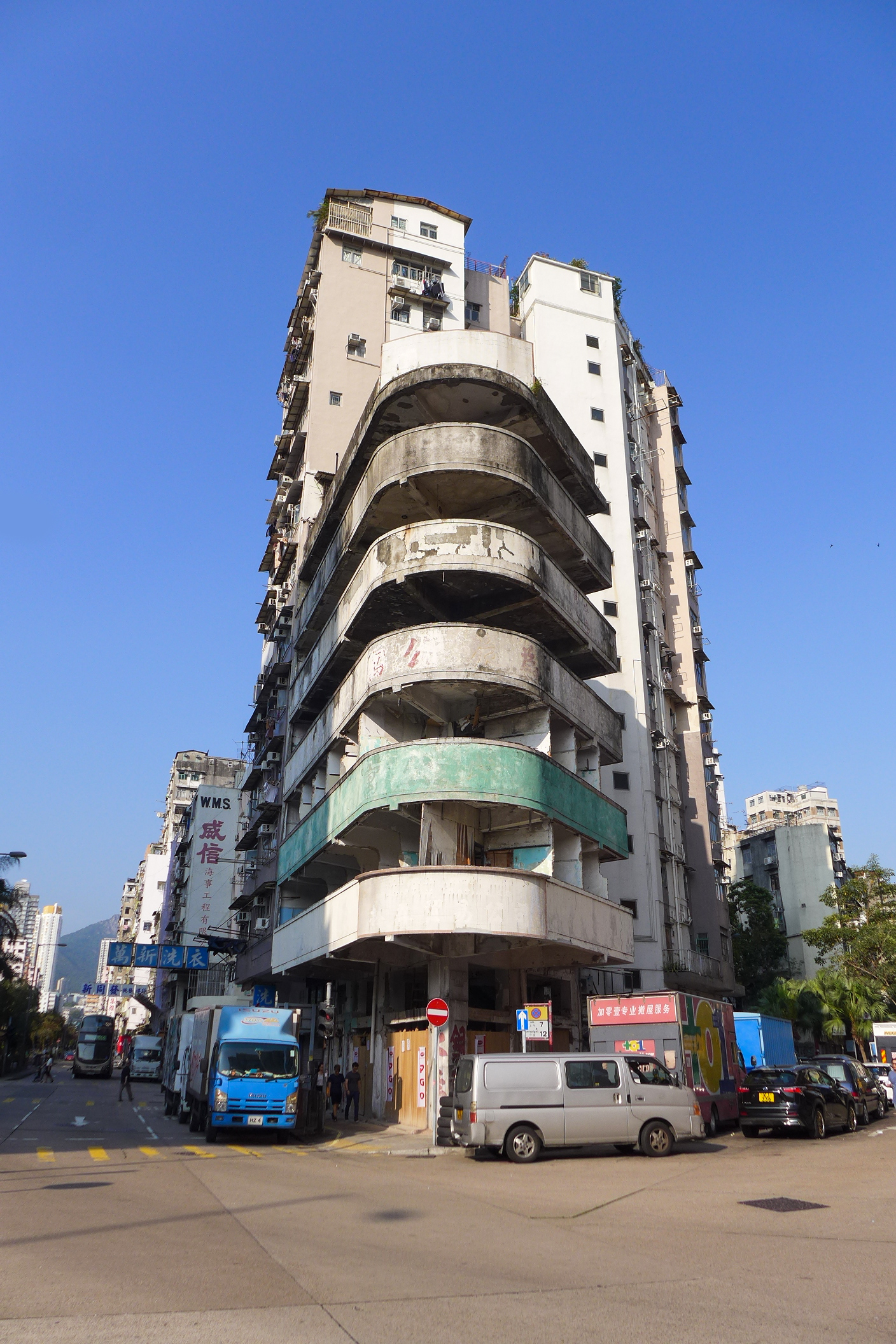
14 Nam Cheong Street in 2017. (Pre-renovation)

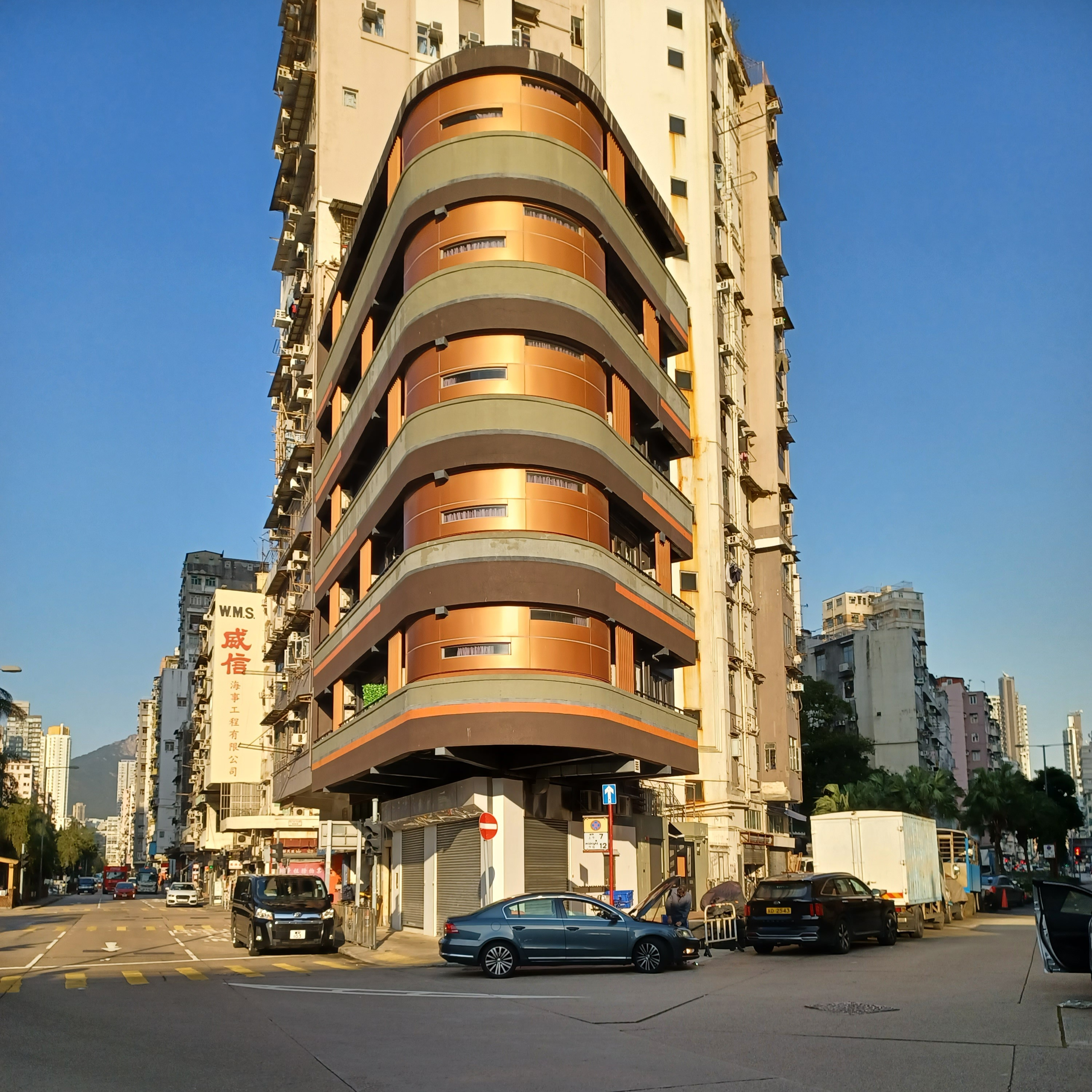
14 Nam Cheong Street in 2023. (Post-renovation)

14 Nam Cheong Street (Chinese: 為群公寓) is a 6-storey building in Hong Kong completed in 1964. The building is a fourth-gen tong lau. It is a corner house.

The building is located in Sham Shui Po District in West Kowloon, at the junction of Nam Cheong Street and Boundary Street. It is busy with people and the units inside are very small.

== History ==
The land was surveyed by the Lands Department.

There are two theories:

1. A theory claimed that it belonged to a wealthy man. According to the Land Registry, the first and second floors of this building were sold to a company for 6 million yuan back in 1991.
2. Another theory states that a person surnamed Cai claimed that this is his ancestral land. The building before is a two-story tenement. Four storeys were built and added in its later years.

In 2015, Mascotte Holdings Limited acquired a number of flats for HKD 34.6 million.

In 2019, the building was renovated as of today. Its exterior is now coloured bronze and its terraces are sealed. The red handwriting sign vanished.

== Other buildings ==
- Sham Shui Po Ferry Pier
- Kwan Tai Temple
- Sham Shui Po Public Dispensary
- Wo Cheong Watches, Jewelry, and Clothing
- 34 Pei Ho Street
- Nam Cheong station
