= Breitenseer Lichtspiele =

Cinema in Vienna, Austria

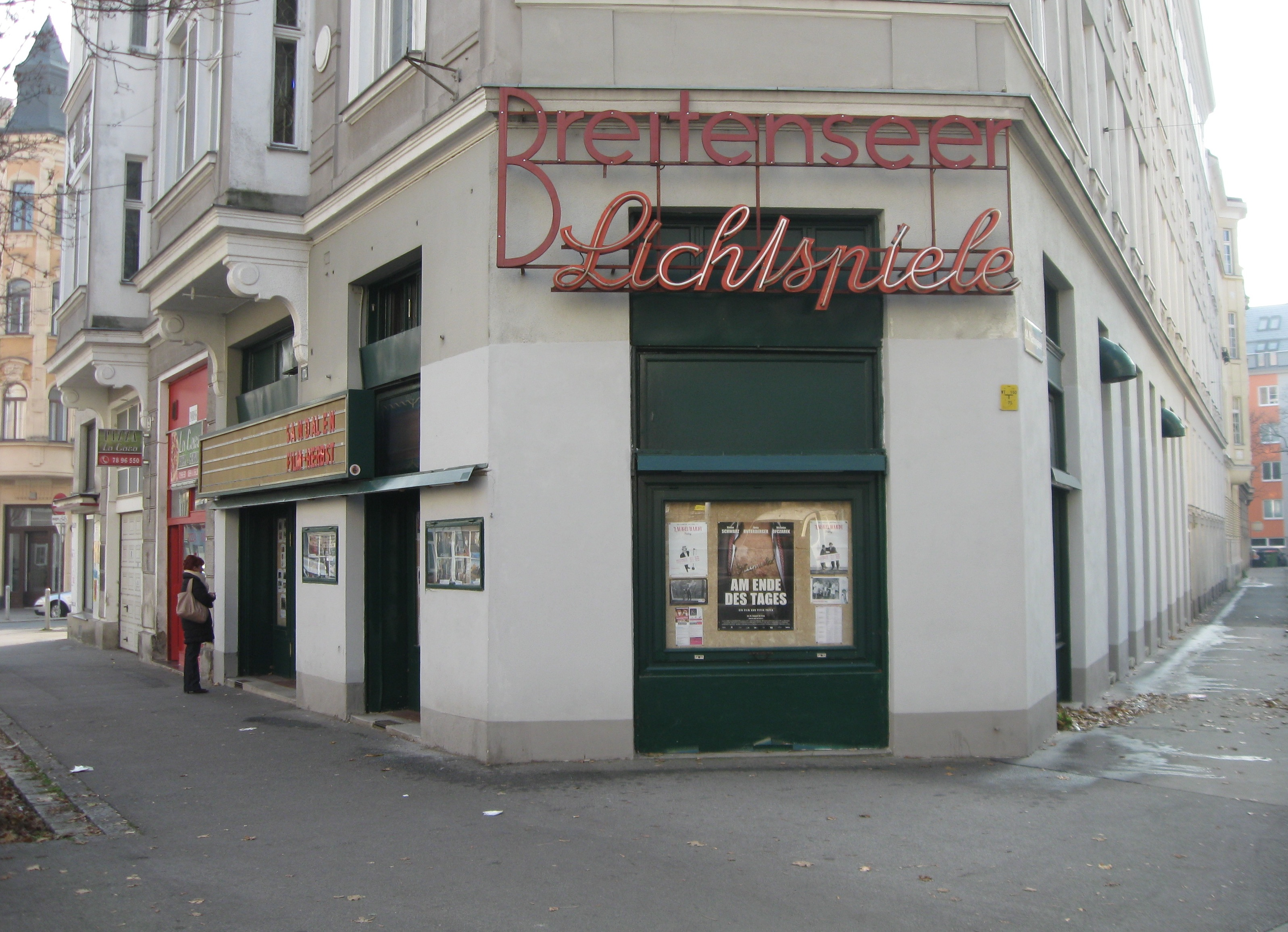
- Breitenseer Lichtspiele, Vienna, Austria
- Interactive map of the Breitenseer Lichtspiele area

General information
- Architectural style: Art deco
- Location: Vienna, Austria, Breitenseer Str., 1140 Vienna
- Coordinates: 48°12′04″N 16°18′34″E

The Breitenseer Lichtspiele, also called Breitenseer Kino, is an art house cinema in the 14th borough Penzing of Vienna (Austria) located at Breitenseer Street 21. It is one of the oldest cinemas in the world that is still in use.

== History ==
The cinema was founded in 1905 under the name Zeltkino Guggenberger near its current location on Breitenseer Street and moved to its current location in 1909. The Breitenseer Lichtspiele is a typical nickelodeon, built into a corner house from the Gründerzeit era. In its height, the cinema had numerous regulars - among them was the Viennese dialect poet H. C. Artmann.

Today Breitenseer Lichtspiele is an arthouse cinema that only shows Austrian and European films. In addition, there are regular silent film screenings, sometimes accompanied by text or music. The cinema has a functioning old movie projector by the Viennese company Friedl & Chaloupka and a small stage with a piano.

== Awards ==
- Österreichischer Kinopreis 2023 (en: Austrian Cinema Prize 2023) of Ministry of the Arts, Culture, the Civil Service and Sport (Austria): Recognition award for single-screen cinemas with committed target group work
