= Corner house =

Building located at a road junction

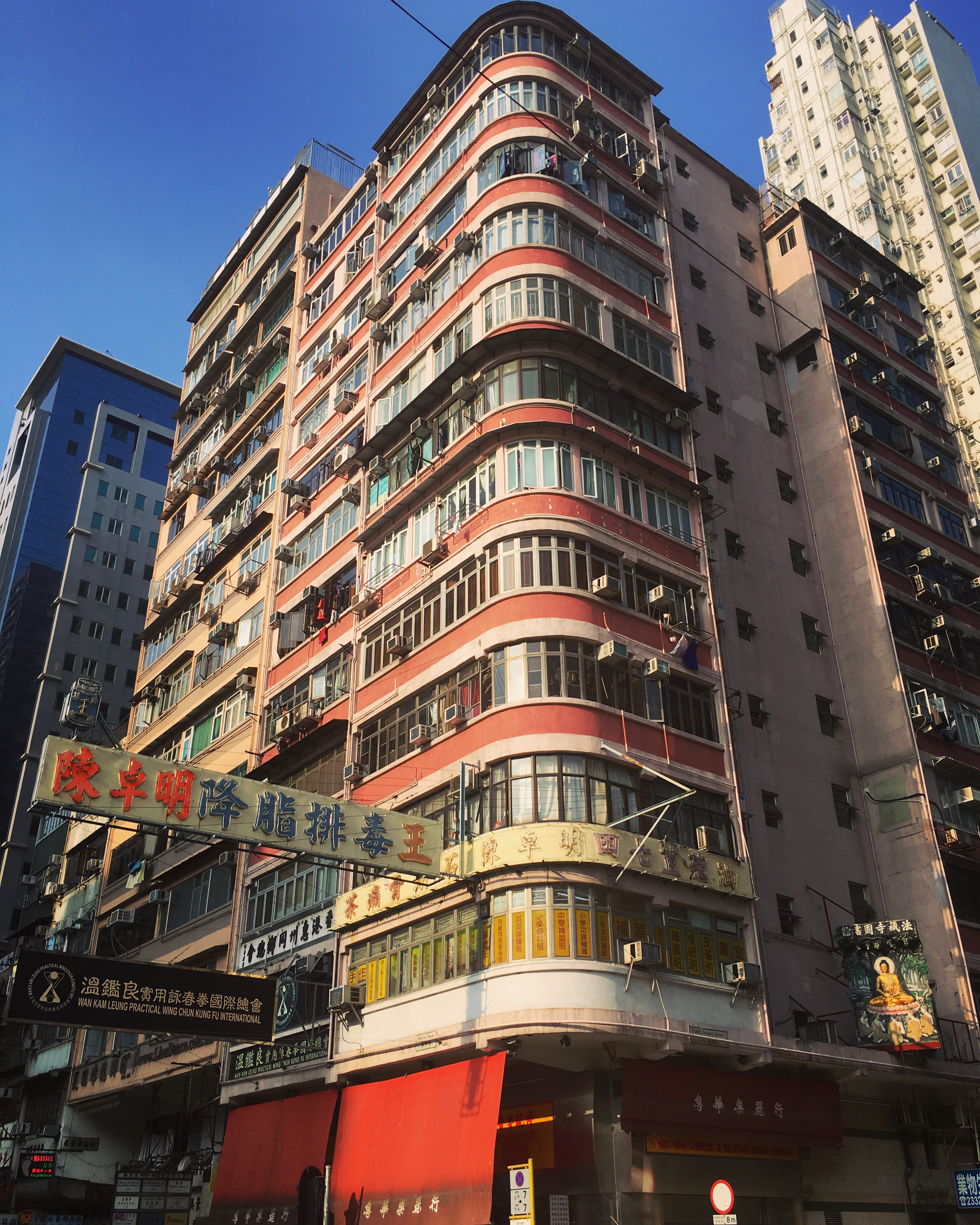
On Cheung Building at the intersection of Public Square Street and Nathan Road

Corner Houses (Chinese: 街角樓) are a type of building located at the junction of two or three roads.

== Hong Kong ==
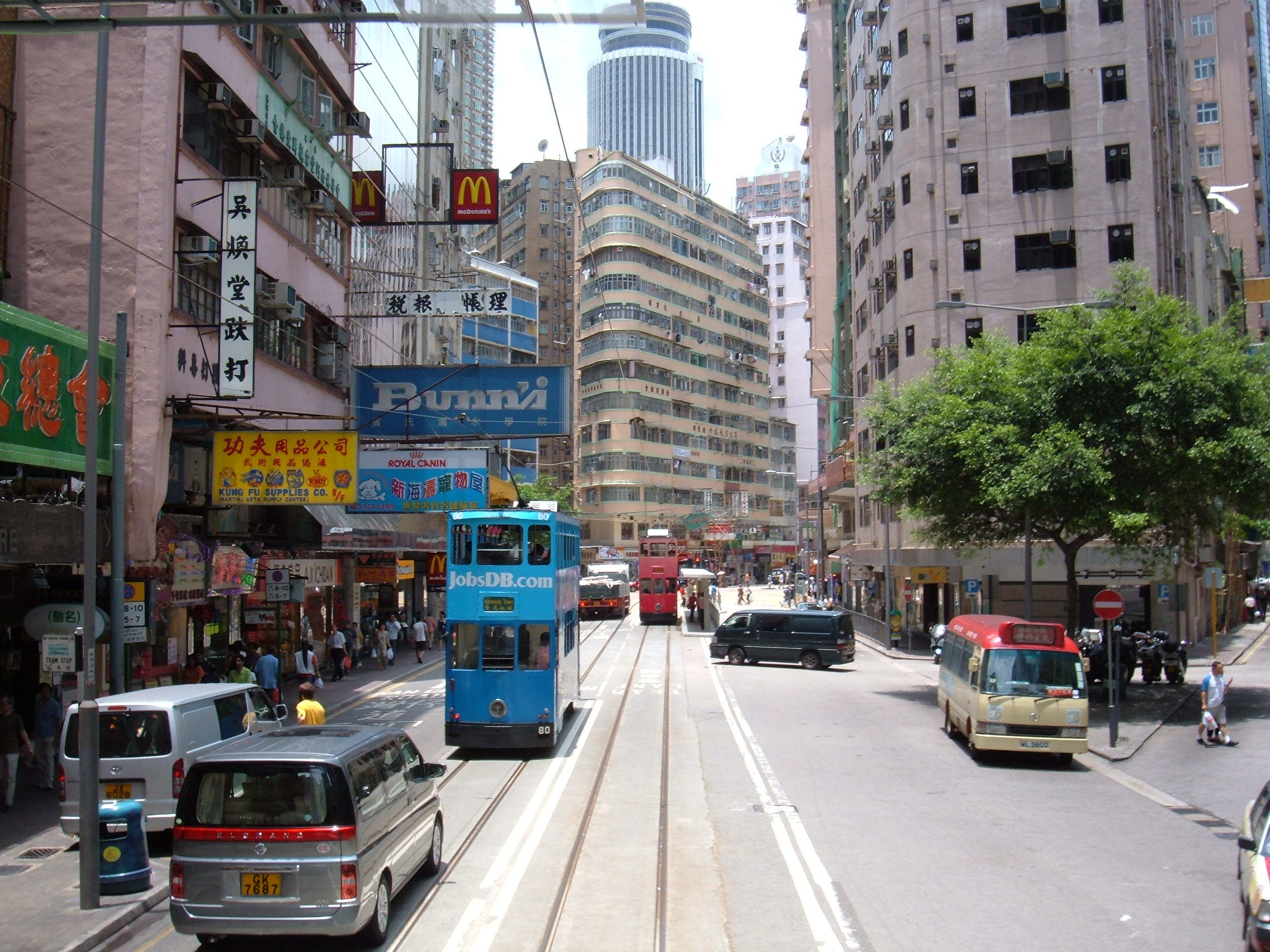
May Wah Building at 164 Johnston Road in Wan Tsai.

Corner houses are buildings located at junctions. In Hong Kong, buildings must meet certain specifications, which is why corner houses are so common on Hong Kong Island and Kowloon.

Corner houses originate from the Composite Buildings of Hong Kong. They were popularized in the 1950s and the 1960s. Most corner houses are fourth-generation tong lau, featuring rounded corners and lines.

Antonio Hermenegildo Basto currently holds the record for the most corner buildings designed in Hong Kong.

=== Locations ===
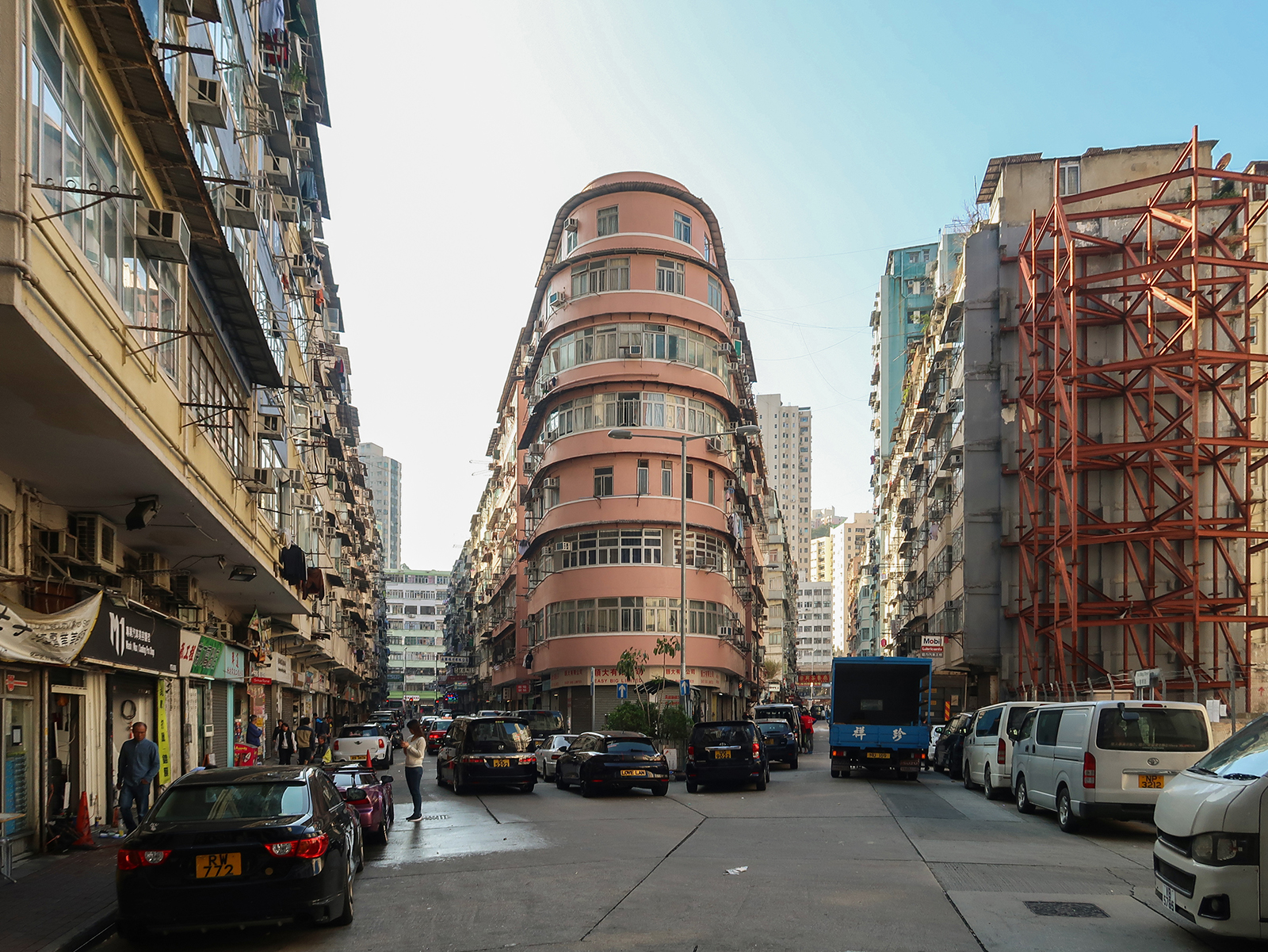
Eiver House in To Kwa Wan

Hong Kong Island: Wan Chai, Causeway Bay, Sai Ying Pun, Shau Kei Wan

Kowloon: Sham Shui Po, Mong Kok, Tai Kok Tsui, To Kwa Wan, Cheung Sha Wan

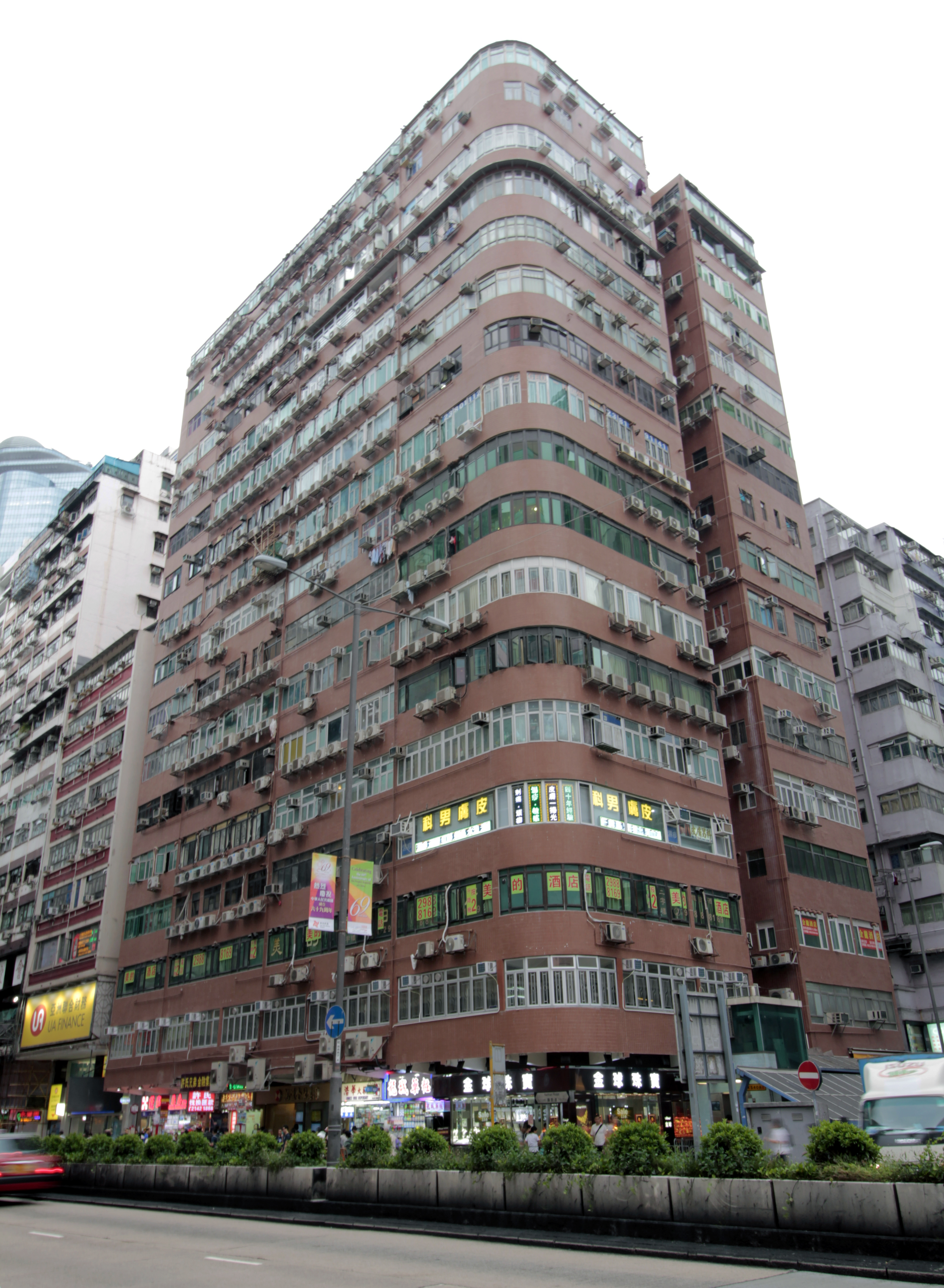
Kingland Apartments in Nathan Road and Bute Street.

=== Styles ===
- Hanging signs in large facades.
- Units in round corners are known as large units.
- Round buildings are built in a Bauhaus style.

=== Types ===
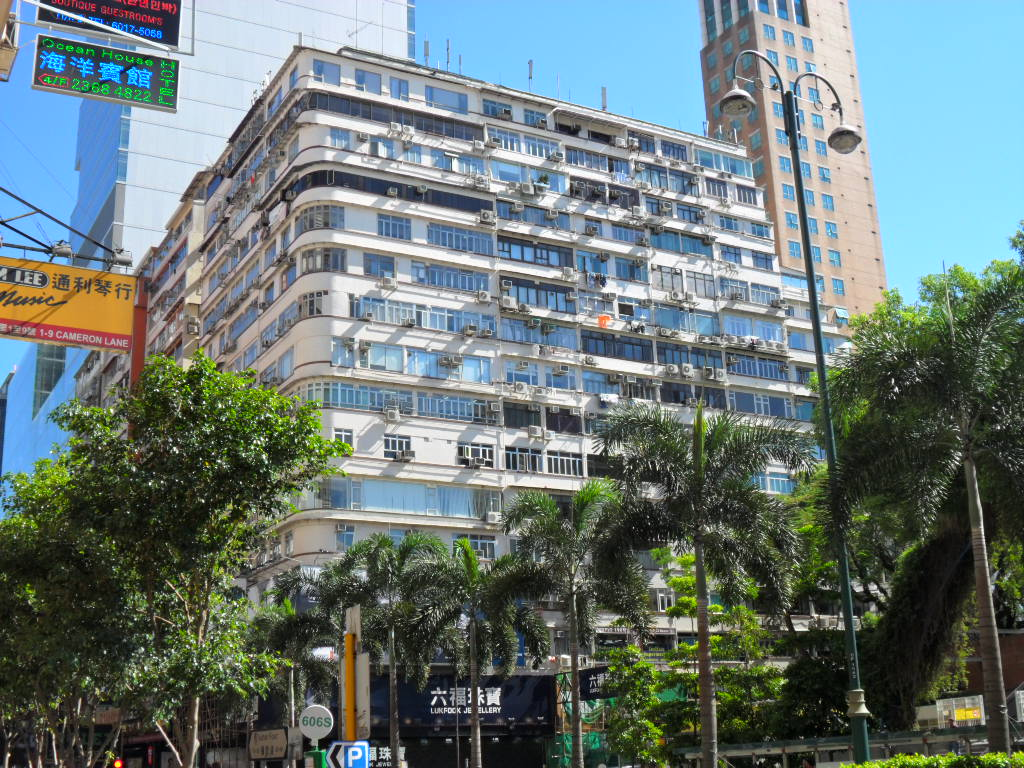
Haiphong Mansion

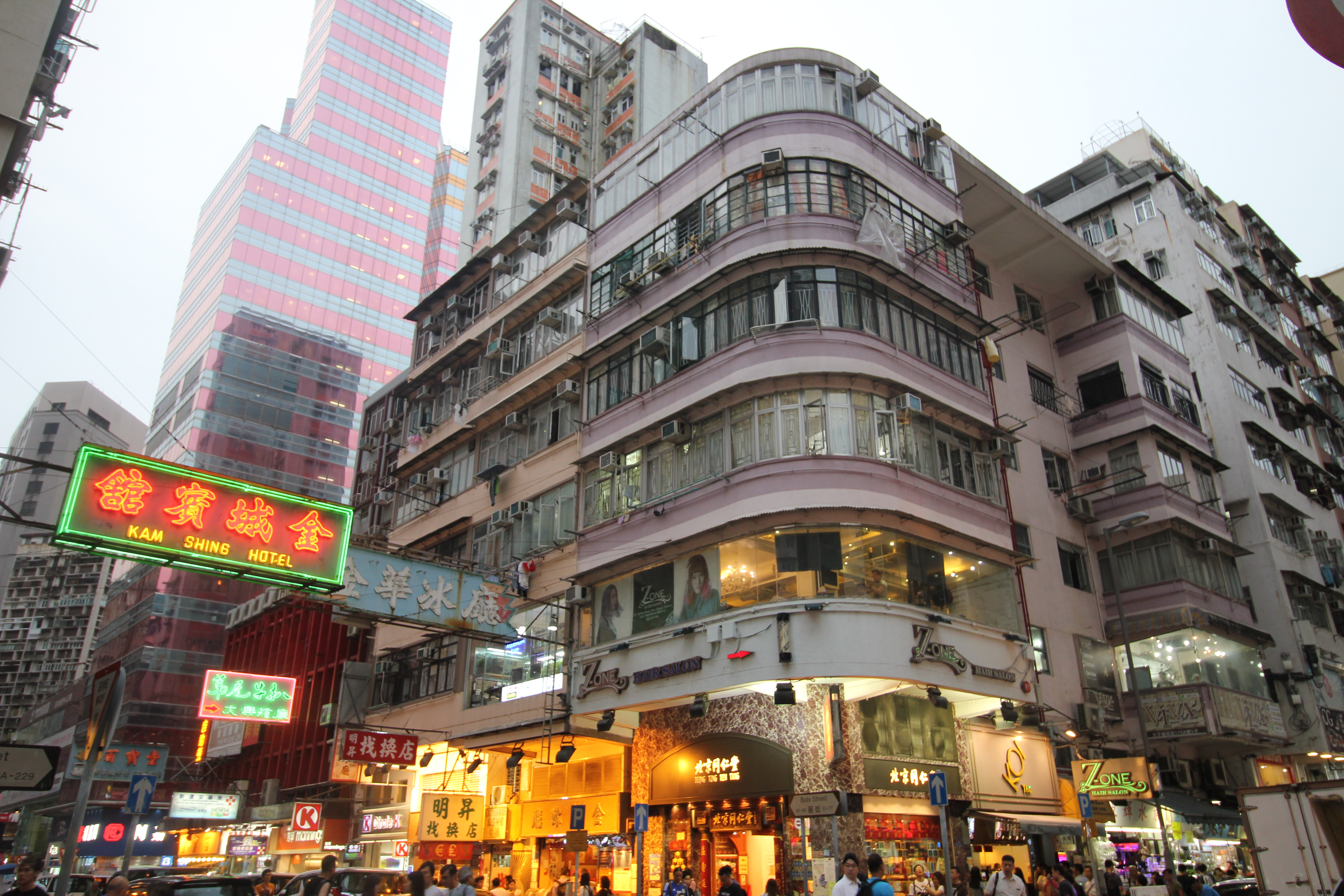
90° Corner（43-49 Bute Street）

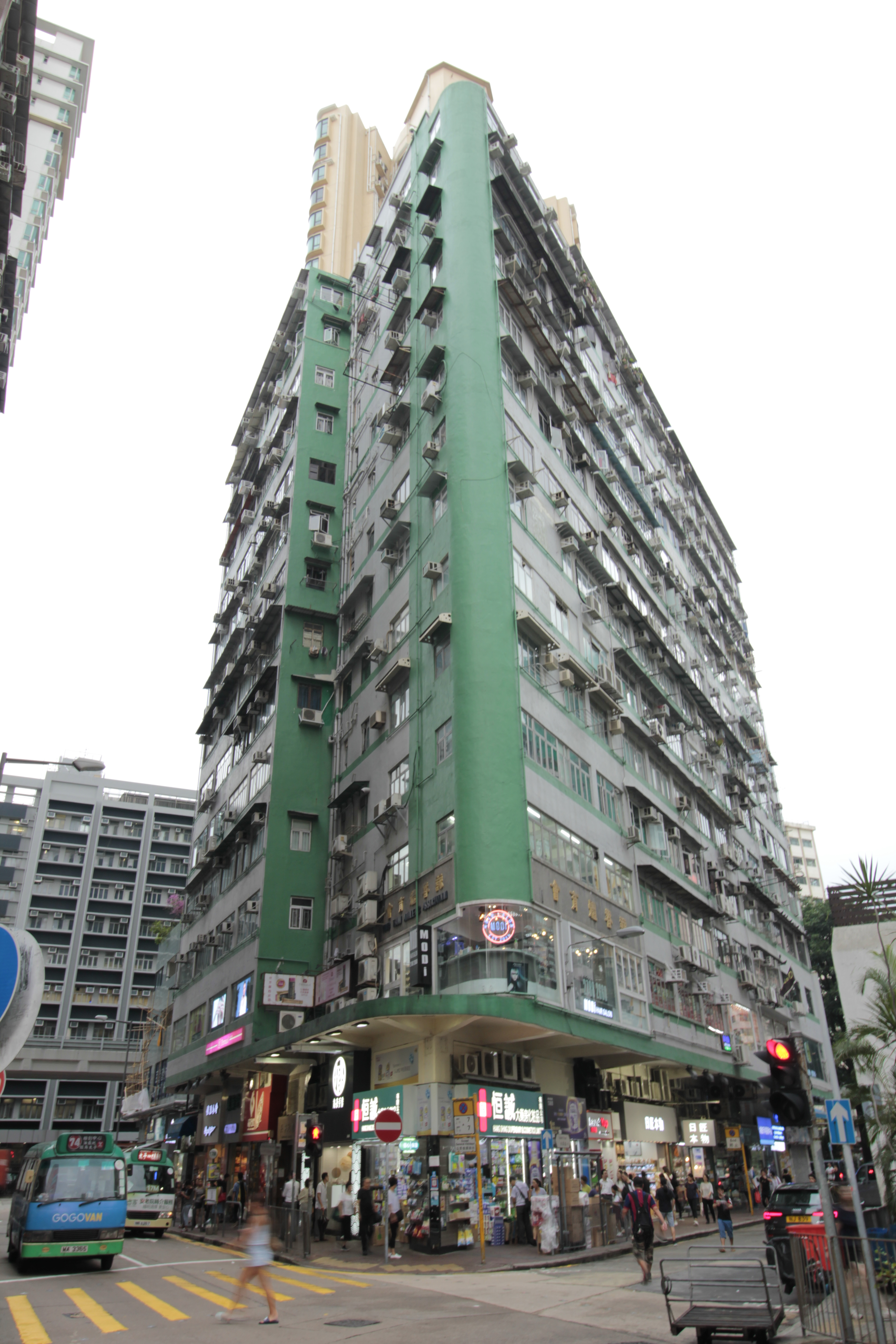
Acute corner (less than 90°) in Cheung Ling Mansion.

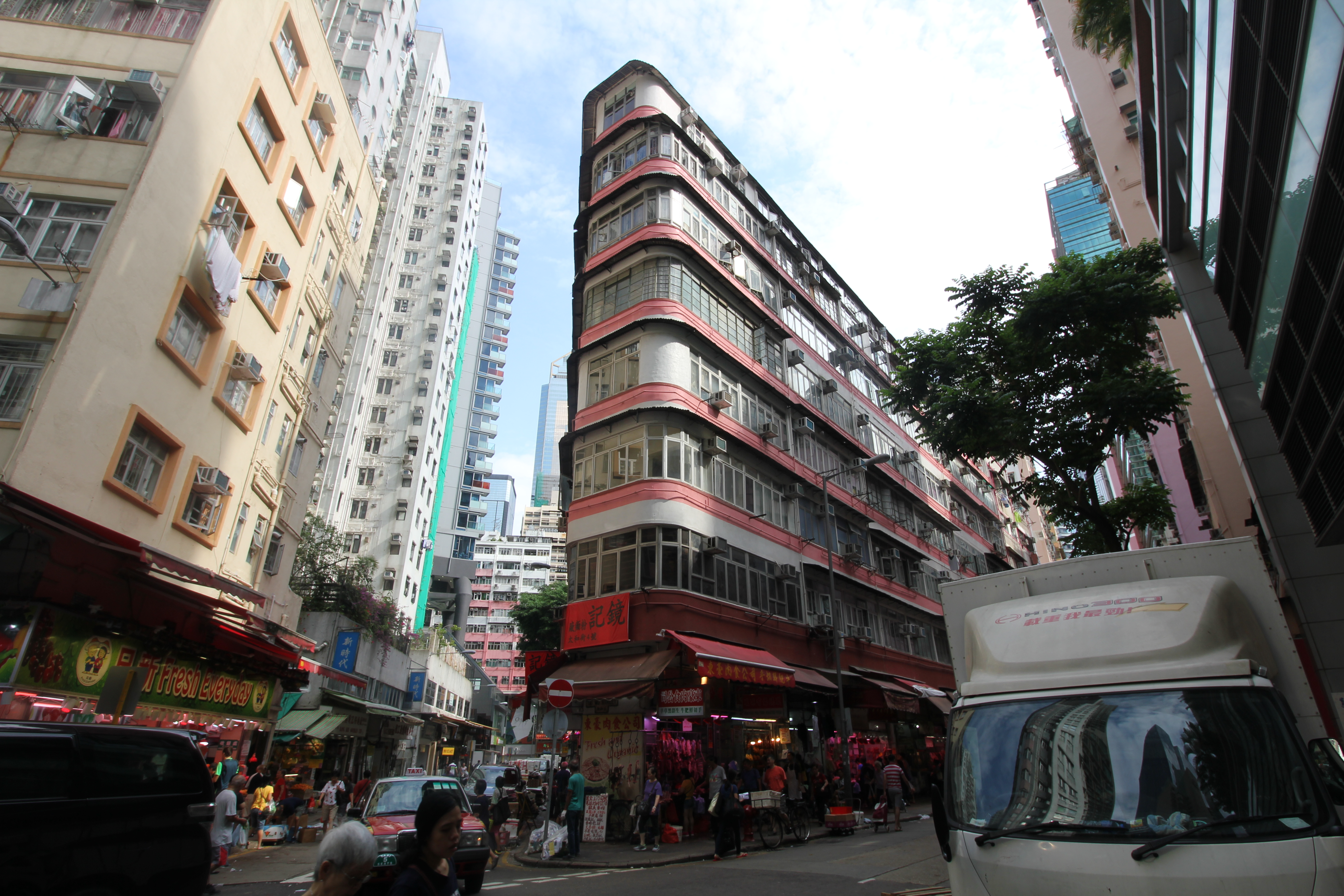
Multilateral Corner (Wanchai Building）

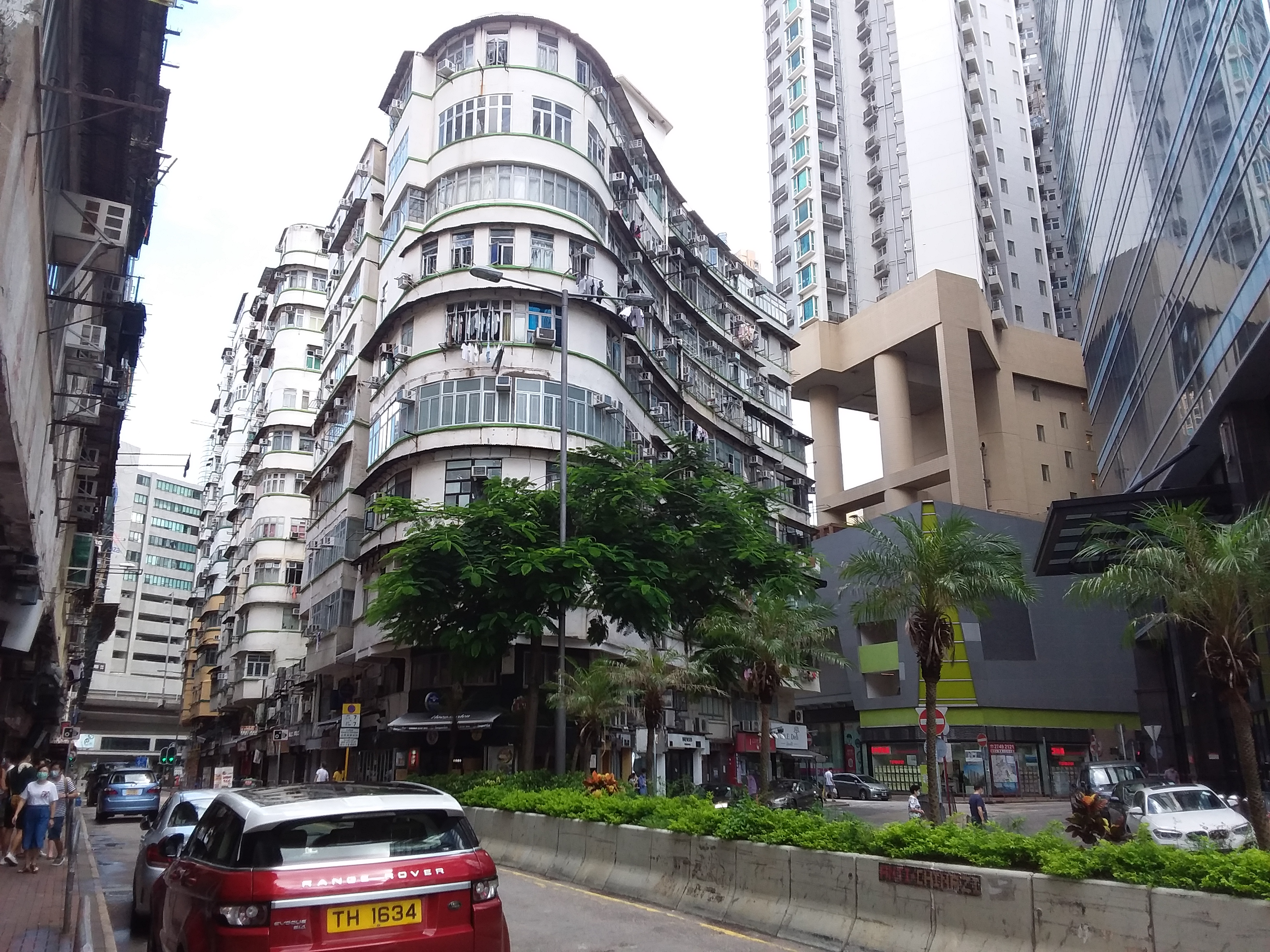
Wavy Corner（Peony House）

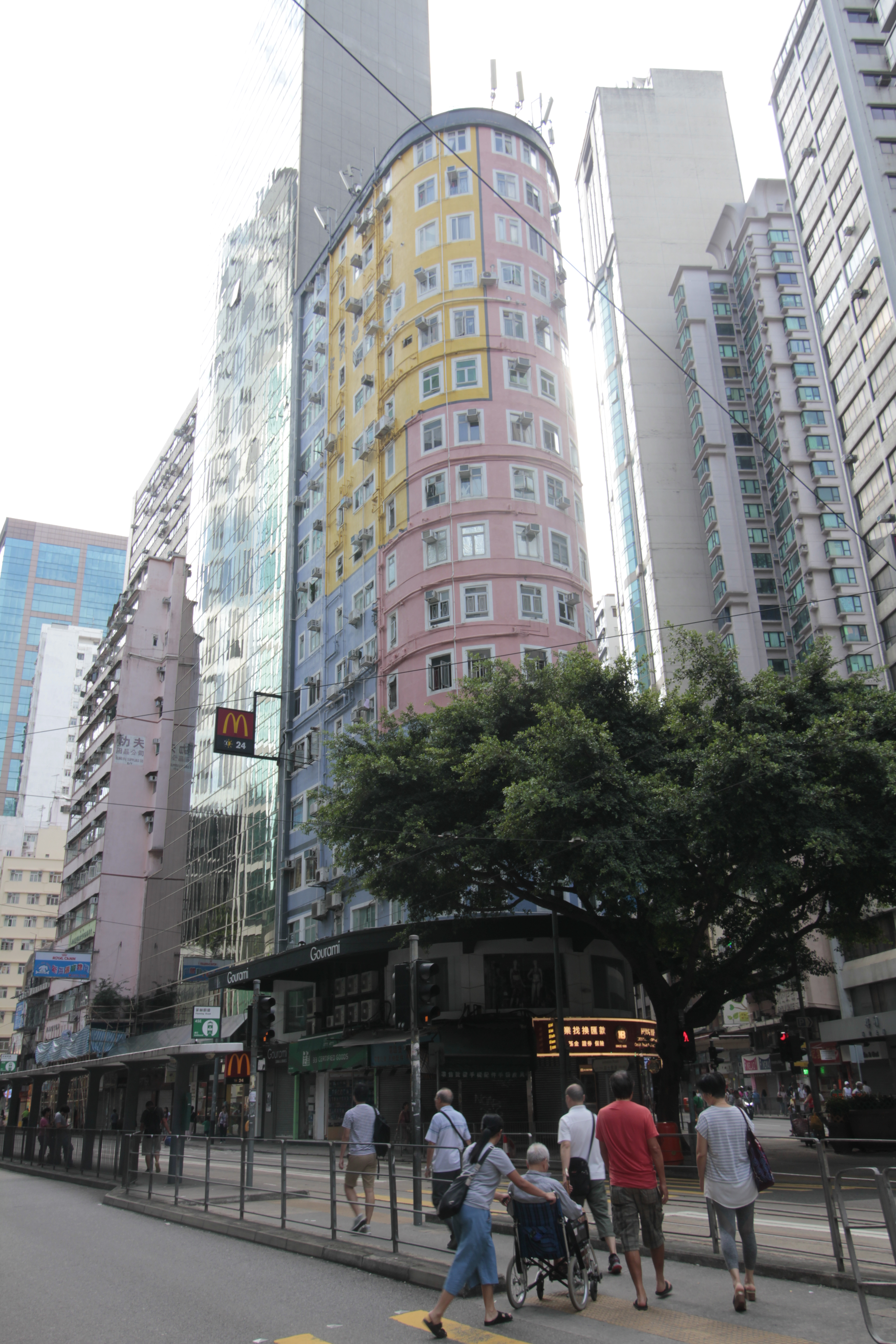
180° Corner（Chung Wui Mansion）

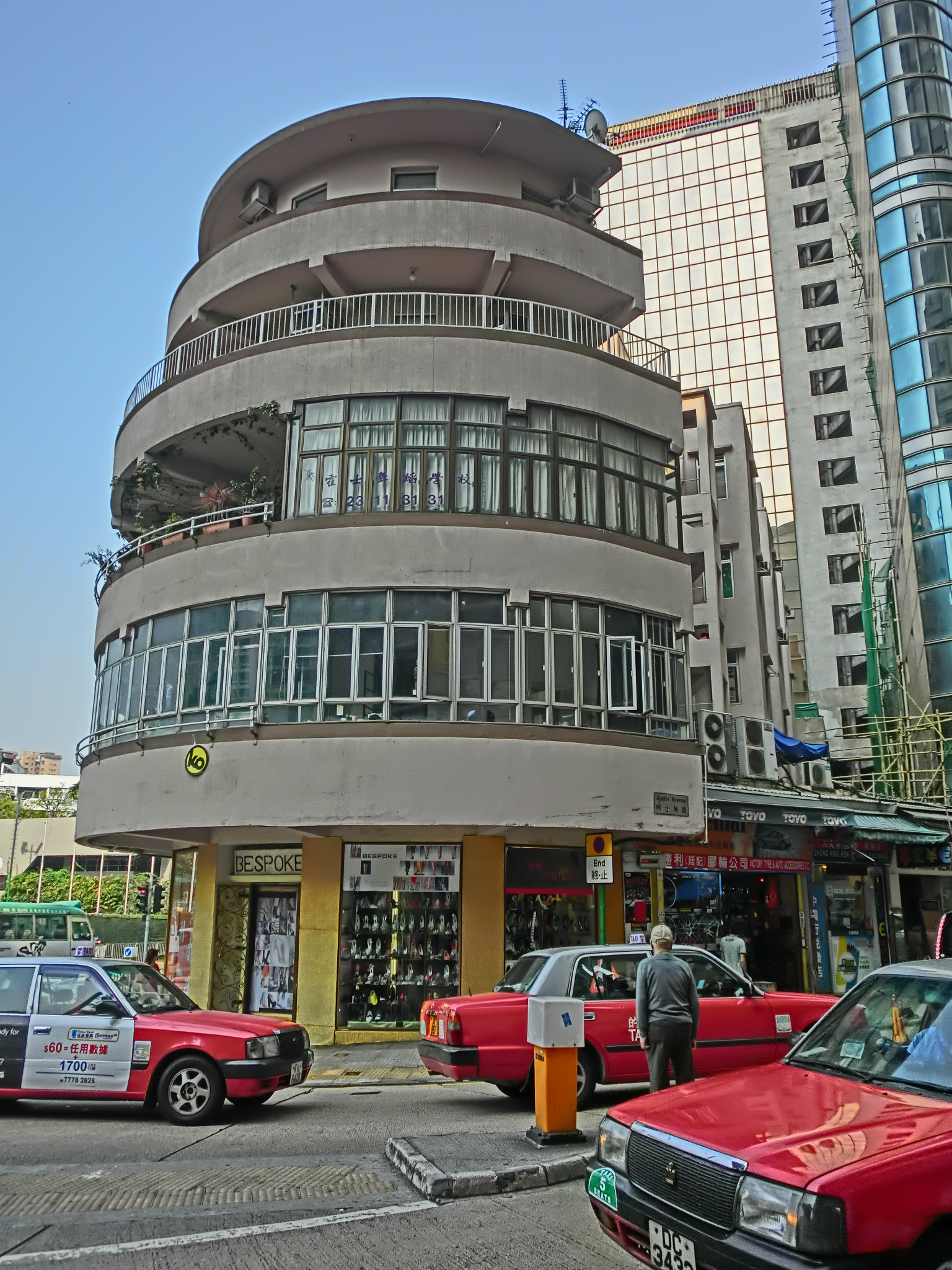
Obtuse Corner (less than 180°) (148 Austin Road）

== Notable buildings ==
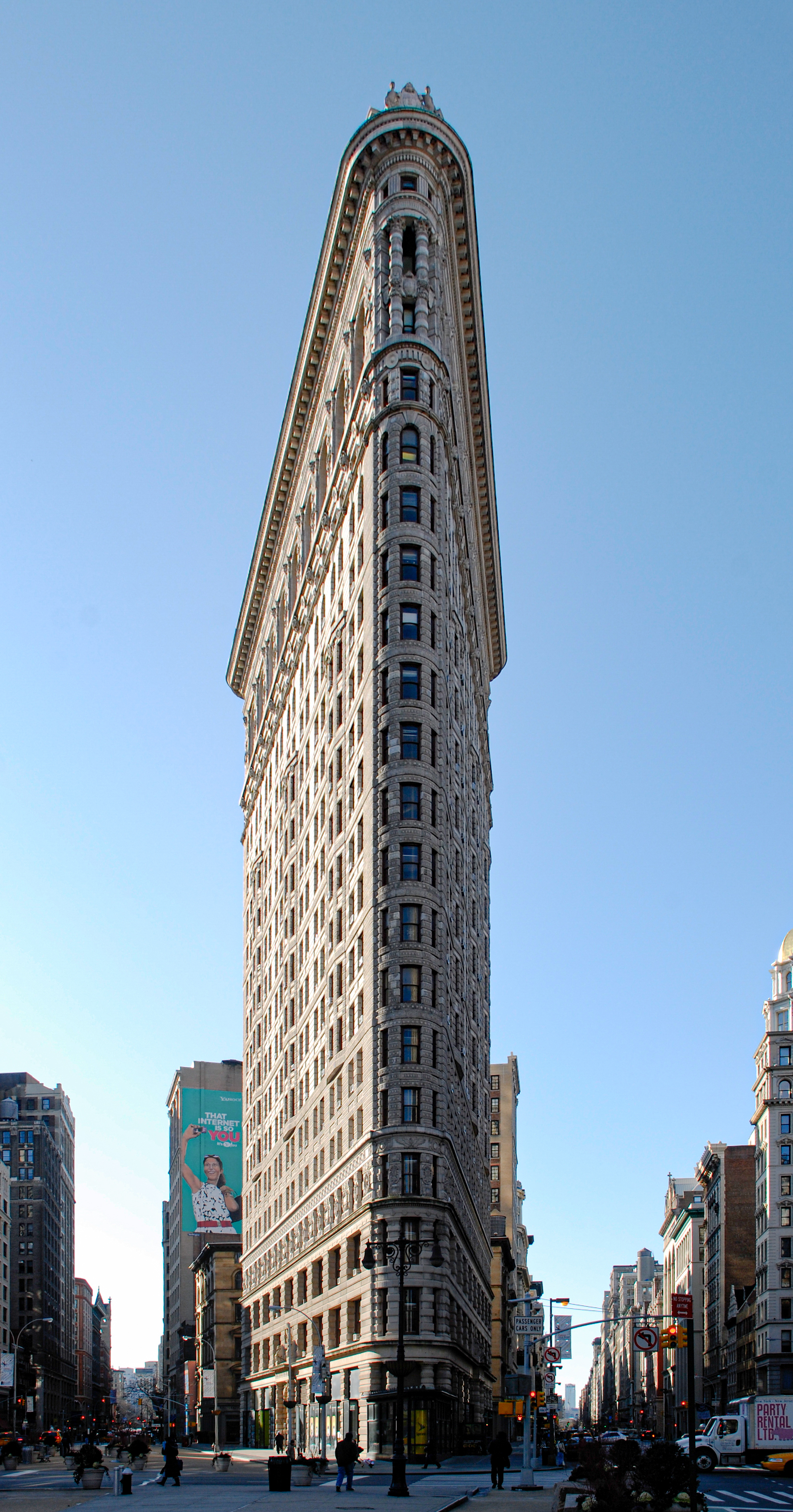
Flatiron Building

=== Hong Kong ===
- 14 Nam Cheong Street (Boundary Street and Nam Cheong Street)
- May Wah Building (Wan Chai Road and Johnston Road
- Mido Cafe (Temple Street and Public Square Street
- New Lucky House (Nathan Road and Jordan Road)
- Chung Wui Mansion (Wan Chai Road, Fleming Road, and Johnston Road)
- Hing Wah Mansion (Babington Path, Park Road, St Stephen's Lane, and Oaklands Path)

=== Taiwan ===
- Hayashi Department Store

=== United States ===
- Flatiron Building (NYC)

=== UK ===
- The Cornerhouse, Nottingham
- Cornerhouse (Demolished)

== See also ==
- Tong lau
- Composite Building
