= May Wah Building =

Coordinates: 22°16′35.5″N 114°10′29.2″E

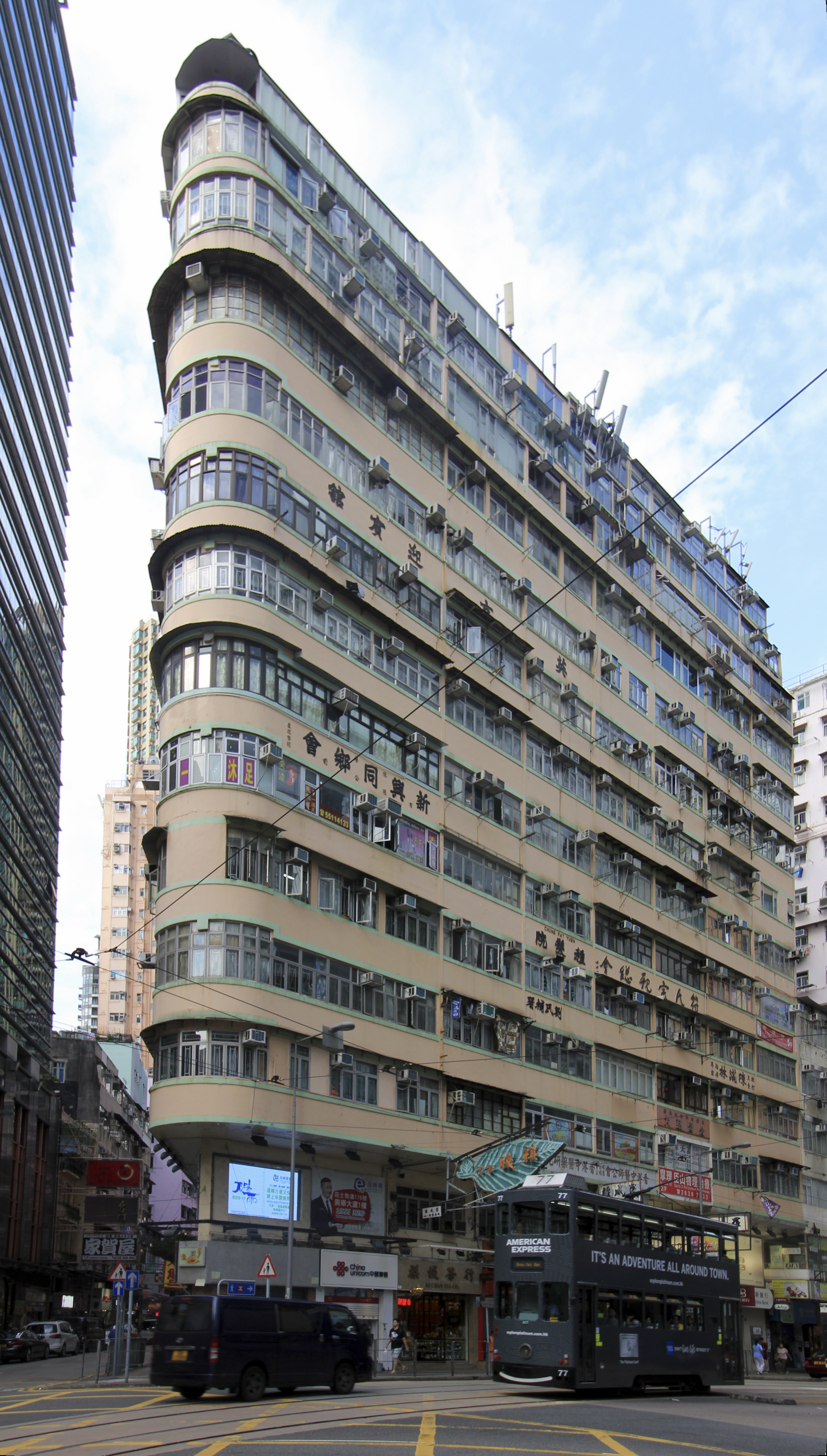
May Wah Building

May Wah Building (Chinese: 美華大廈), also registered as Mei Wah Building, is a composite building in Wan Chai, Hong Kong, located at the corner of Johnston Road and Wan Chai Road. Completed in 1963, the building contains 80 units.

== Architectural characteristics ==
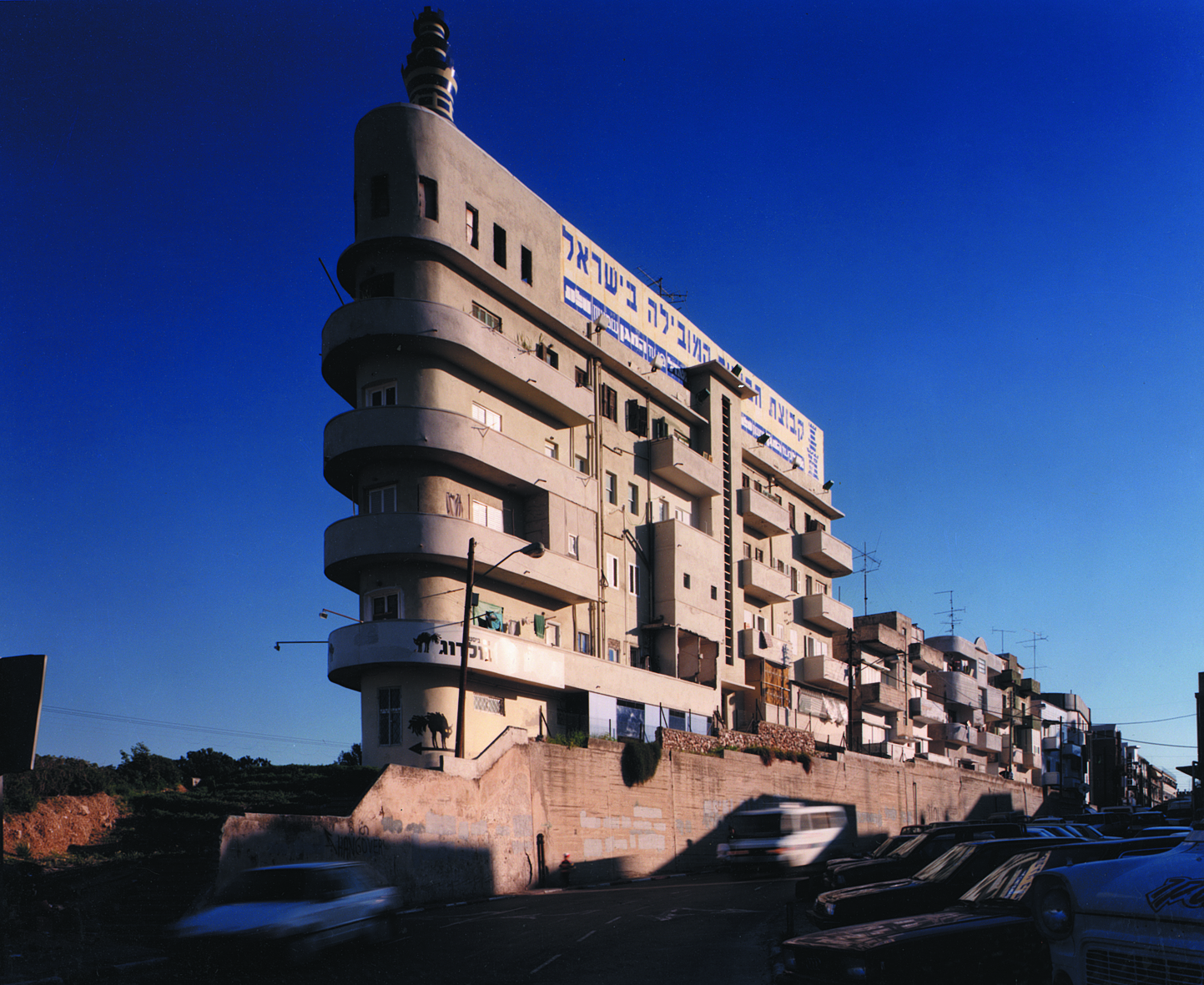
The building is inspired by 20th-century Bauhaus.

- Building Height: 14 stories: Ground + 13 floors
- Completion: 1963
- Type: Composite building
- Use: Residential and Commercial
- Corner: Less than 90°, making it an acute corner building.
- Style: 20th-century modernism/Bauhaus
- Address: 164–176 Johnston Road and 80 Wan Chai Road

One of the corners is less than 90°.

Note: The terrace of May Wah Building looks like a big teardrop. This is due to the government believing a design of this type would protect people from rain. Also, the walkway of Johnston Road need to be widened, making the terraces of May Wah mansion showing the width of the walkway pre-widening.

== Occupants ==
- G/F: Ki Chan Tea Co.
- 4/F: Daci Hospital
- 6/F: Fu Clansmen General Association Headquarters
- 7/F: [to be completed]
- 10/F: Ying King Guesthouse

In 2010, the building was described as "covered from top to bottom with signage of functioning and defunct businesses that include a guest house, clan associations, hair and beauty salons, two Chinese tea shops, fashion retail shops, massage parlors, Western and traditional Chinese medical clinics, tuition schools, fortune tellers and a feng-shui consultant."

== See also ==
- Corner Houses
- Bauhaus
- Modernism
