= Composite building =

Hong Kong architectural style

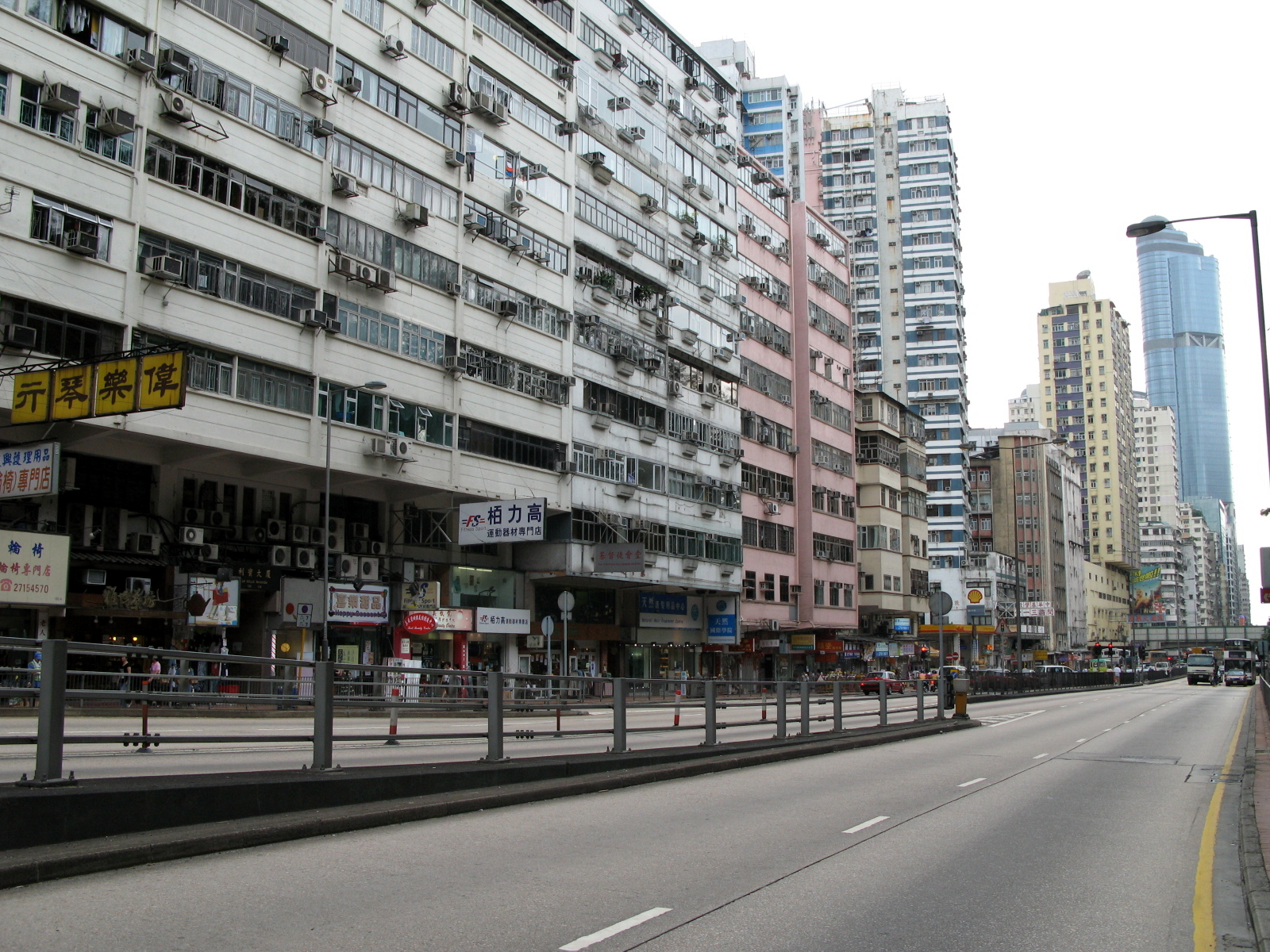
Composite buildings on Argyle St.

Composite buildings are a common feature of the architectural style of Hong Kong buildings that were constructed in the 1950s and the 1960s.

== History ==
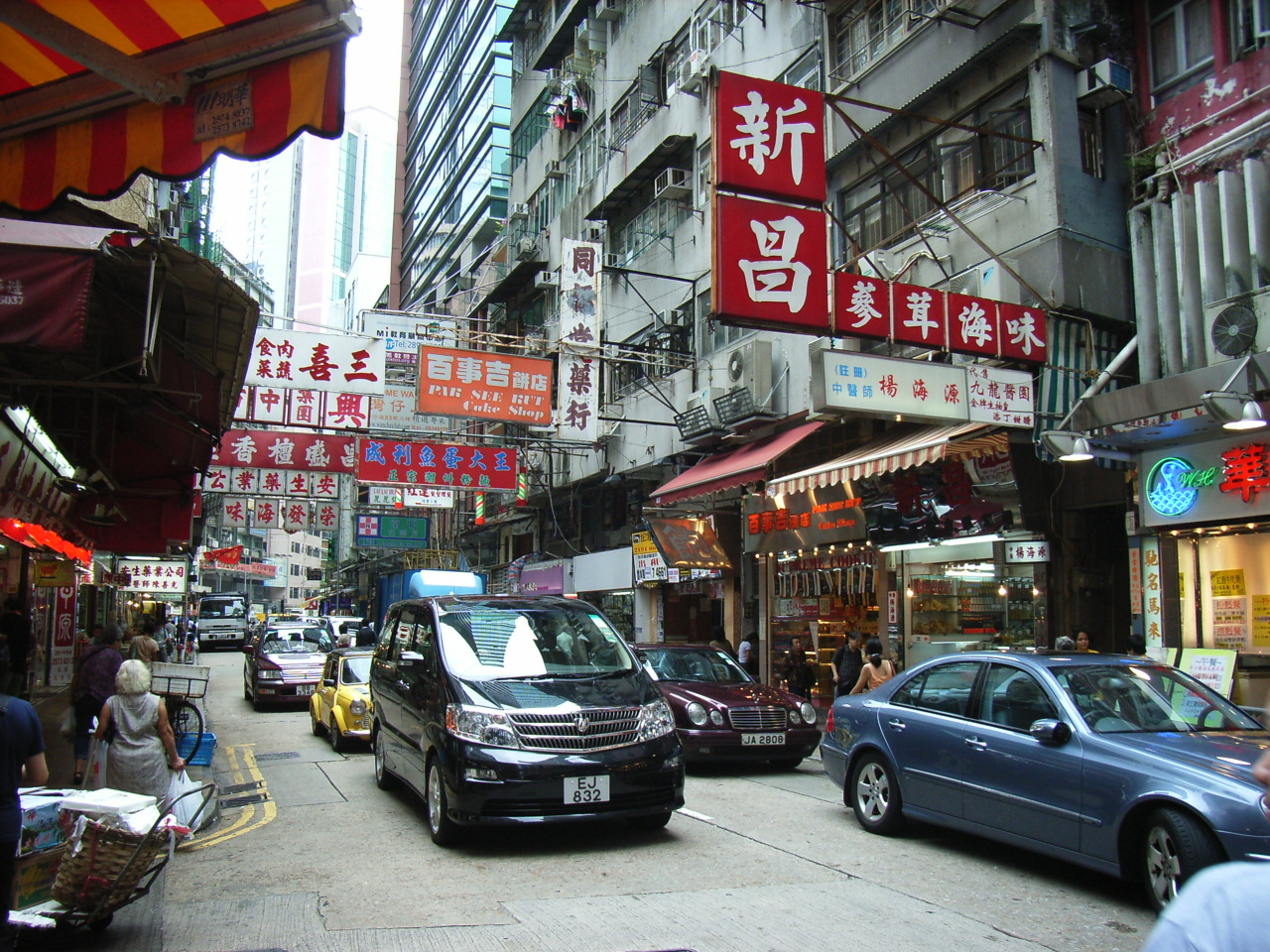
Ground-floor shops and stores in residential buildings on Wan Chai Rd.

The term "composite building" came from the Building Ordinance and refers to residential buildings with workplaces and workshops.

Composite buildings are abundant in Hong Kong because:

- The People's Republic of China was founded in 1949, when Hong Kong was a capitalist state, which provided capitalists with opportunities to develop industries.
- In the early 1950s, China was under trading sanctions, which made it possible for Britain to transform Hong Kong into a hub for exports and manufacturing.
- Composite buildings met demands for housing and increased employment during a population boom.

== Standards ==
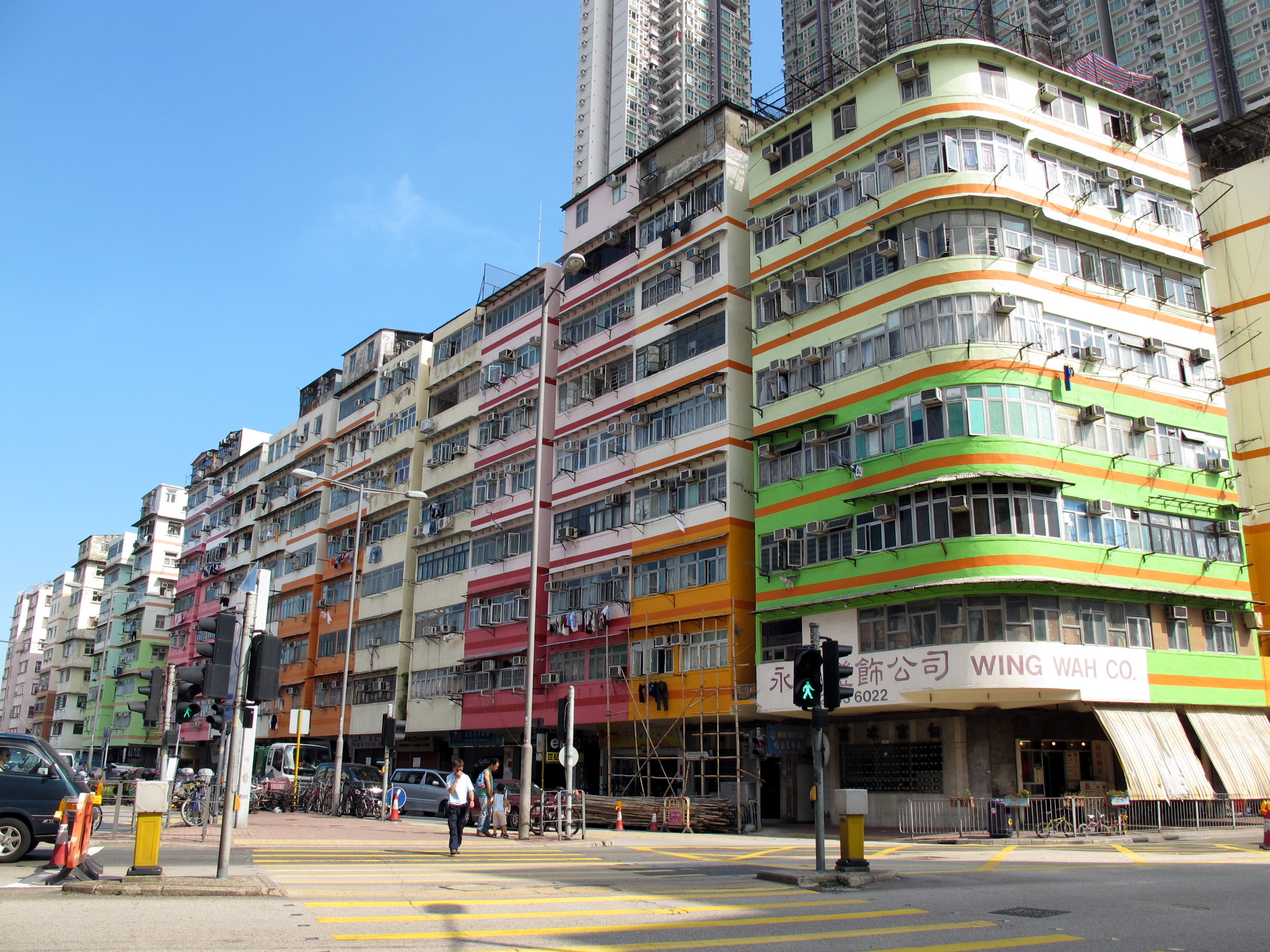
Seven-to-eight-storey blocks on 13 Streets in Hong Kong. The buildings are only seven or eight storeys in height due to the height restriction imposed on buildings being close to Kai Tak Airport.

- Building Ordinance states a composite building must have a part for residential and a part for other uses.
- Buildings with ten or more storeys or more must have a lift installed, limiting height to save costs.
- Due to aircraft departing from or landing at Kai Tak Airport, buildings in Kowloon have height restrictions.

== Architecture ==
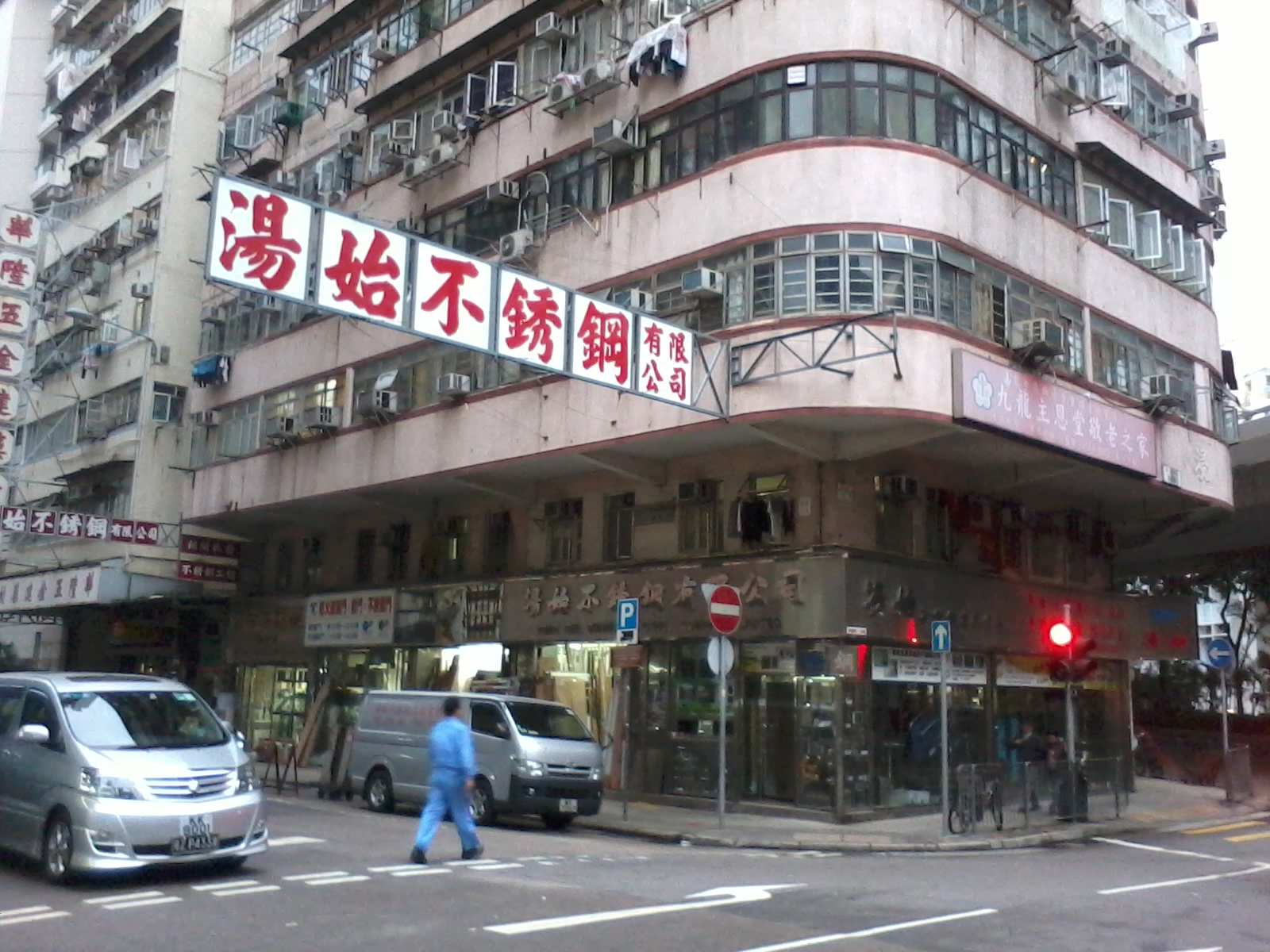
A corner building with rounded corners.

Corner buildings typically have rounded corners. Rounded buildings have cantilevered terraces on all floors above ground floor. Store names on signs hanging from the lower and upper floors can be seen in the building. The architecture combines modern, international, and Bauhaus styles.

=== Gallery ===
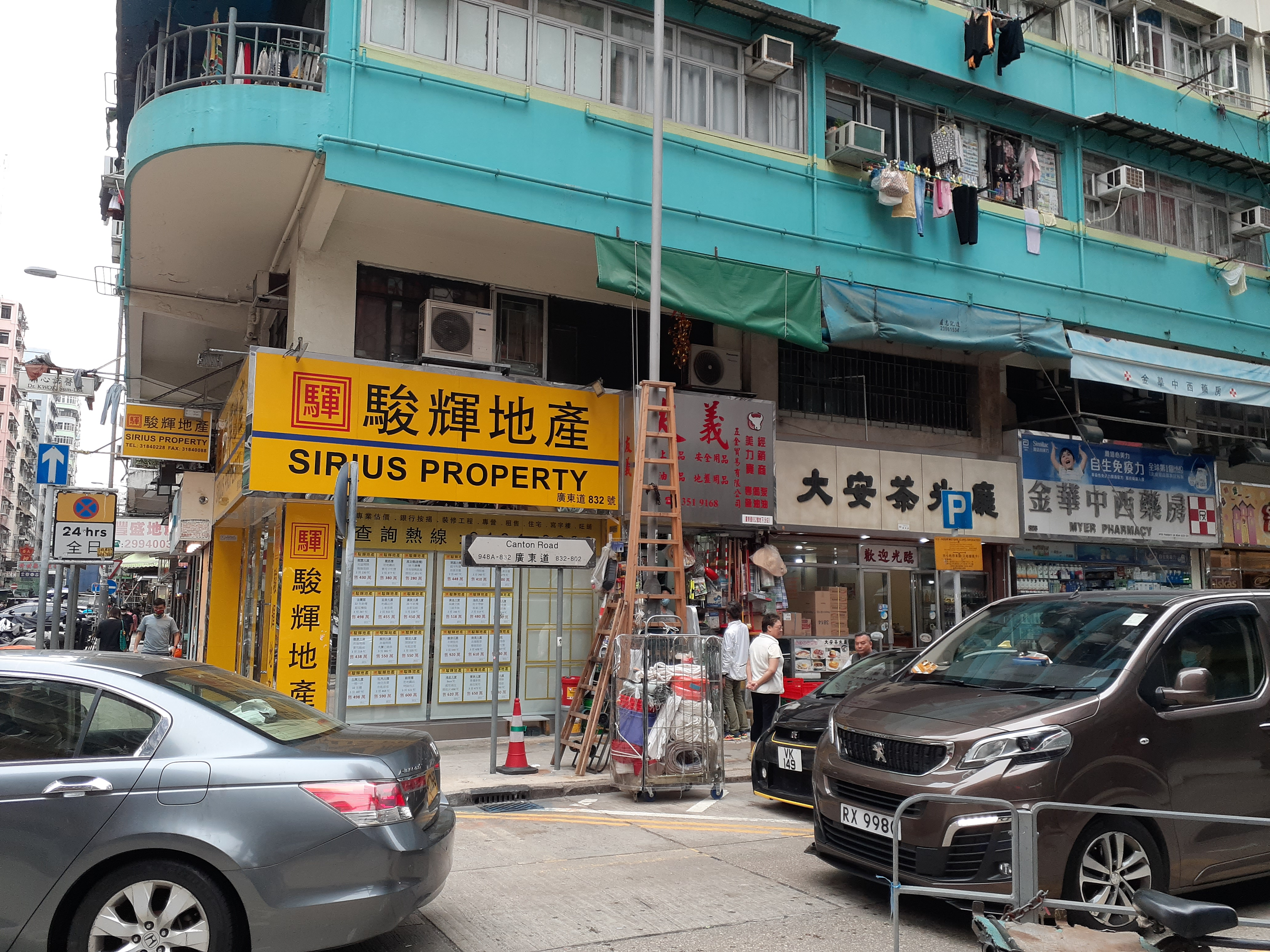
Cantilevered terrace on the ground of a block.

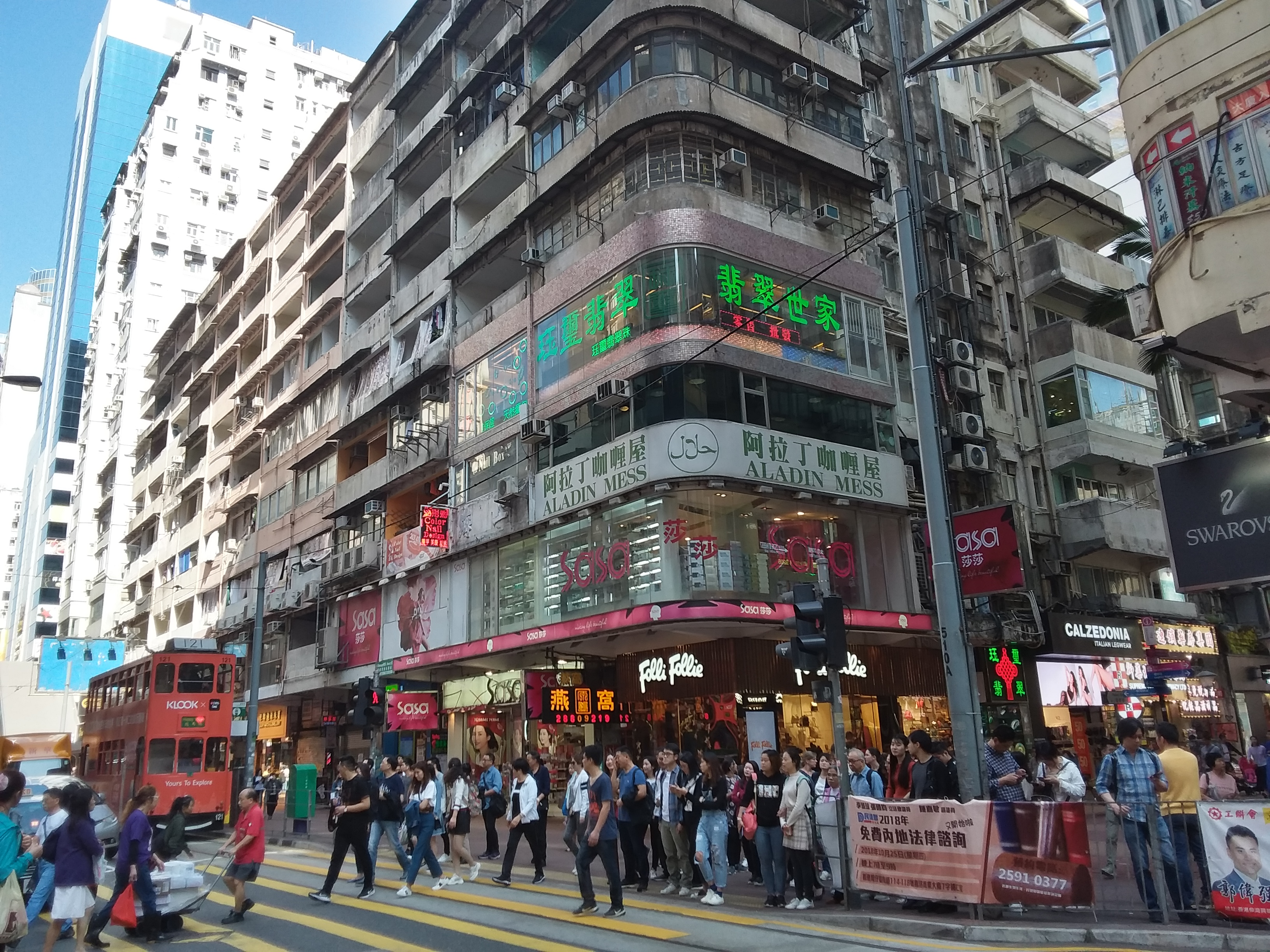
A building with sealed terraces.

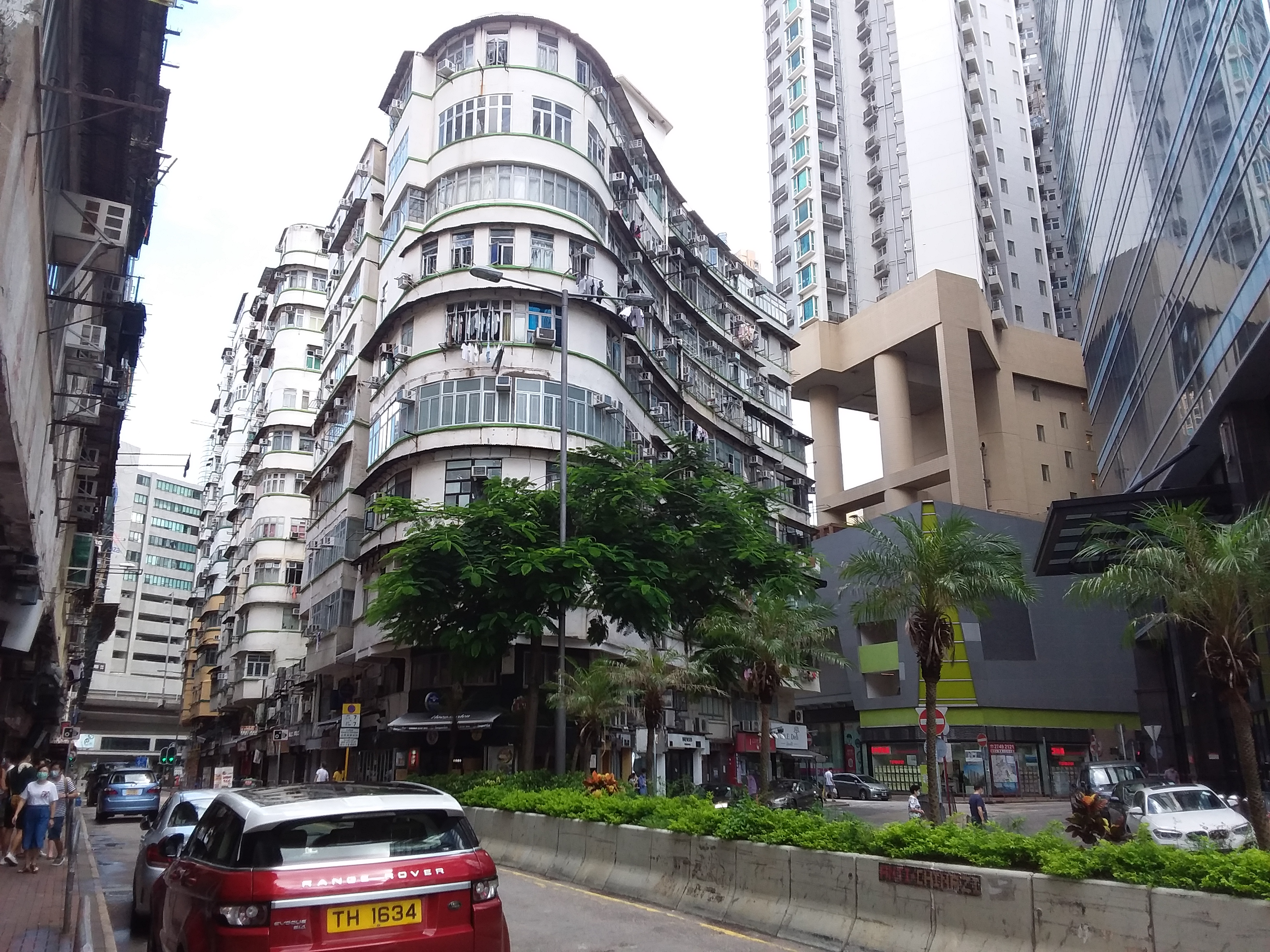
The architecture fuses with modern elements.

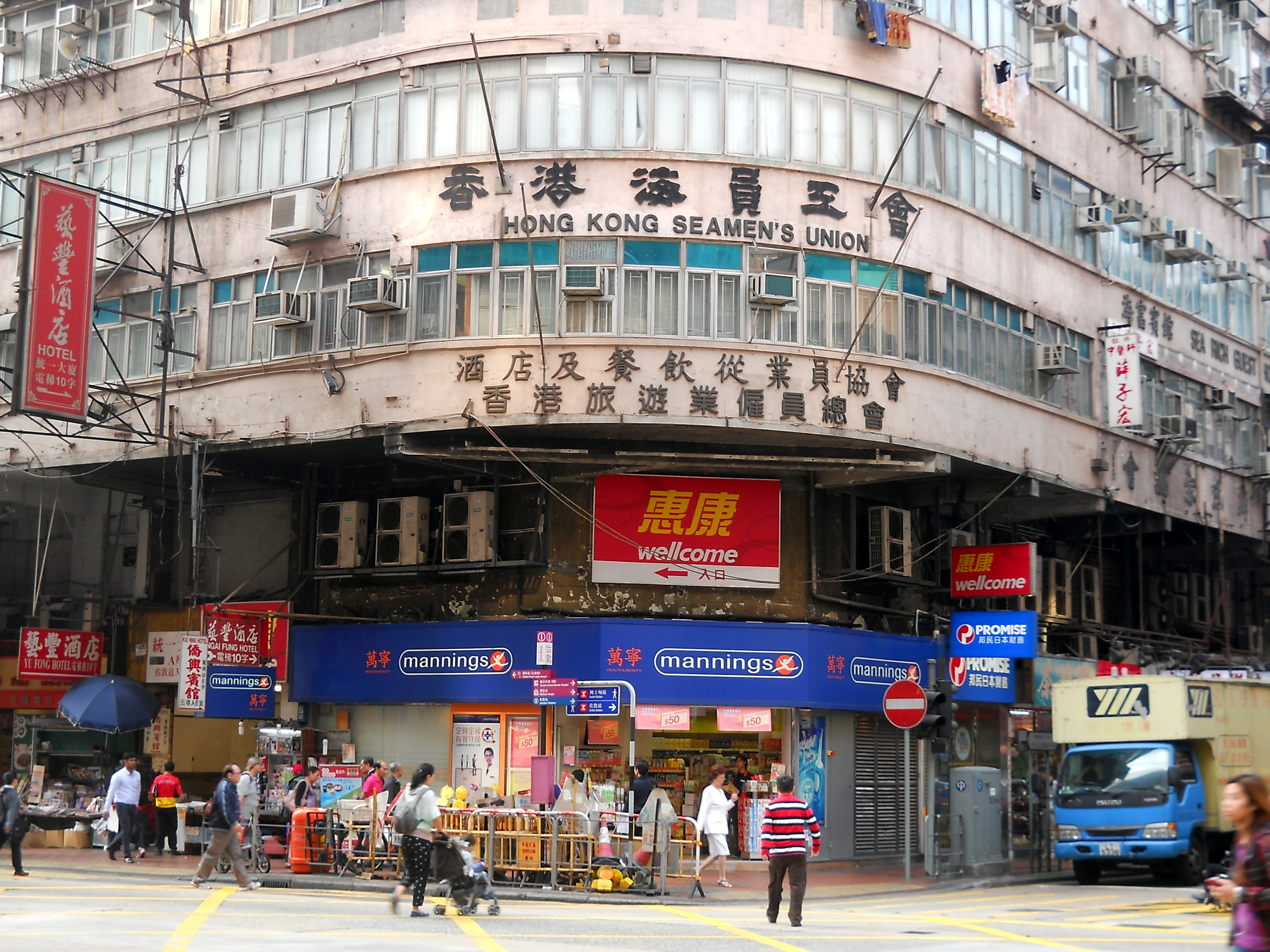
An inscription found on a building's entrance.

== Today ==
Following declines in Hong Kong's manufacturing sector, some remaining spaces have been converted into hotels, hospitals, beauty salons, parlours, clubs, and fitness centres.

Many of the buildings built in the twentieth century are subject to acquisition by developers; they are demolished and then replaced with taller, high-rise buildings like the ones on Berwick Street, Shek Kip Mei. However, some of them are being restored to slow down their aging, increase their safety, and improve their appearance.

== In popular culture ==
Many movies take place in a setting with buildings such as these. Neon signs are often used to make it look like the movie takes place in a high-density city. These buildings were featured in scenes from the following movies: Blade Runner, Ghost in the Shell, Deus Ex, Shenmue II, Sleeping Dogs and Case Files. They are also sometimes featured in cyberpunk music.

== Gallery ==
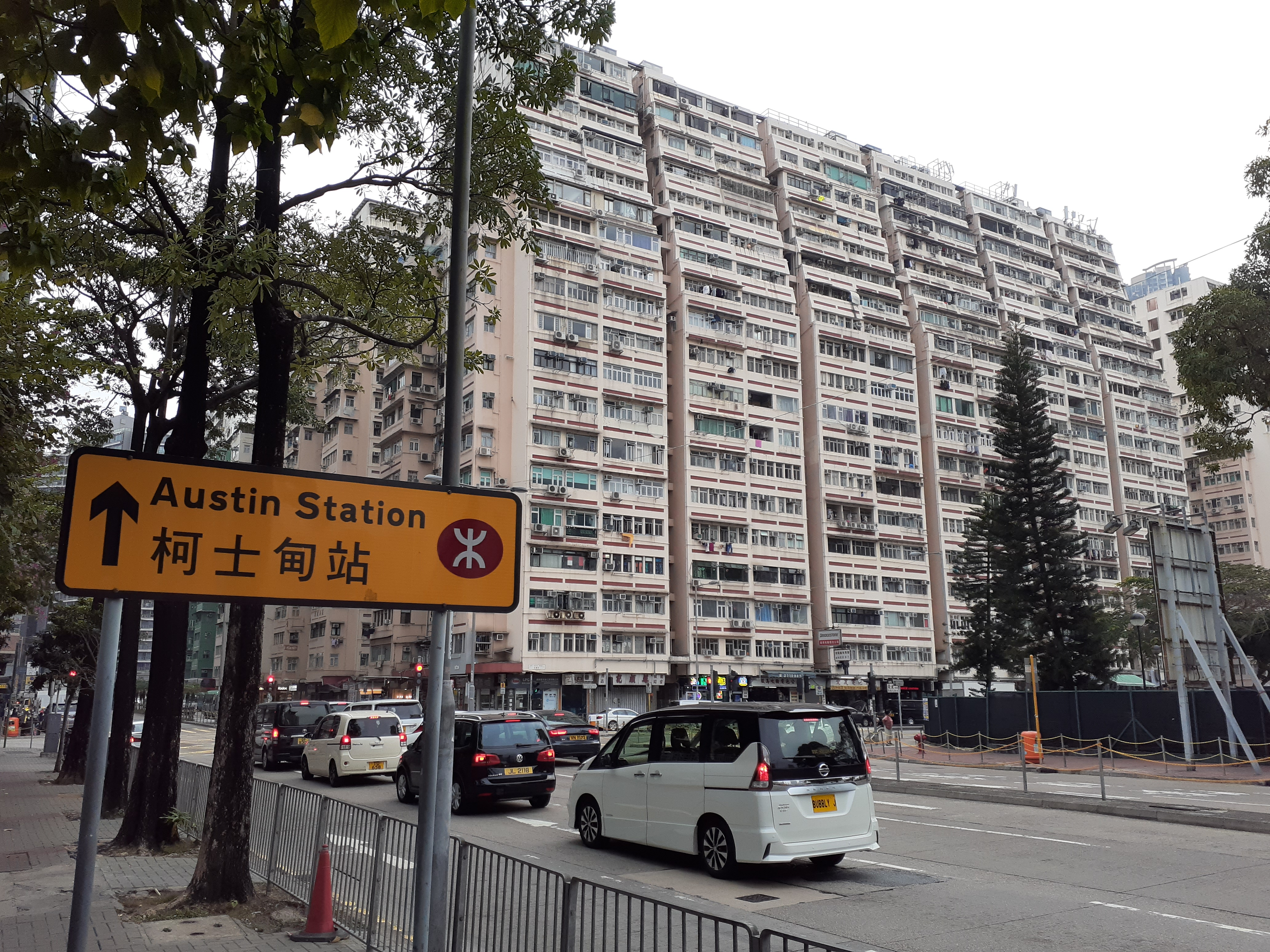
Man Wah Sun Chuen, Jordan

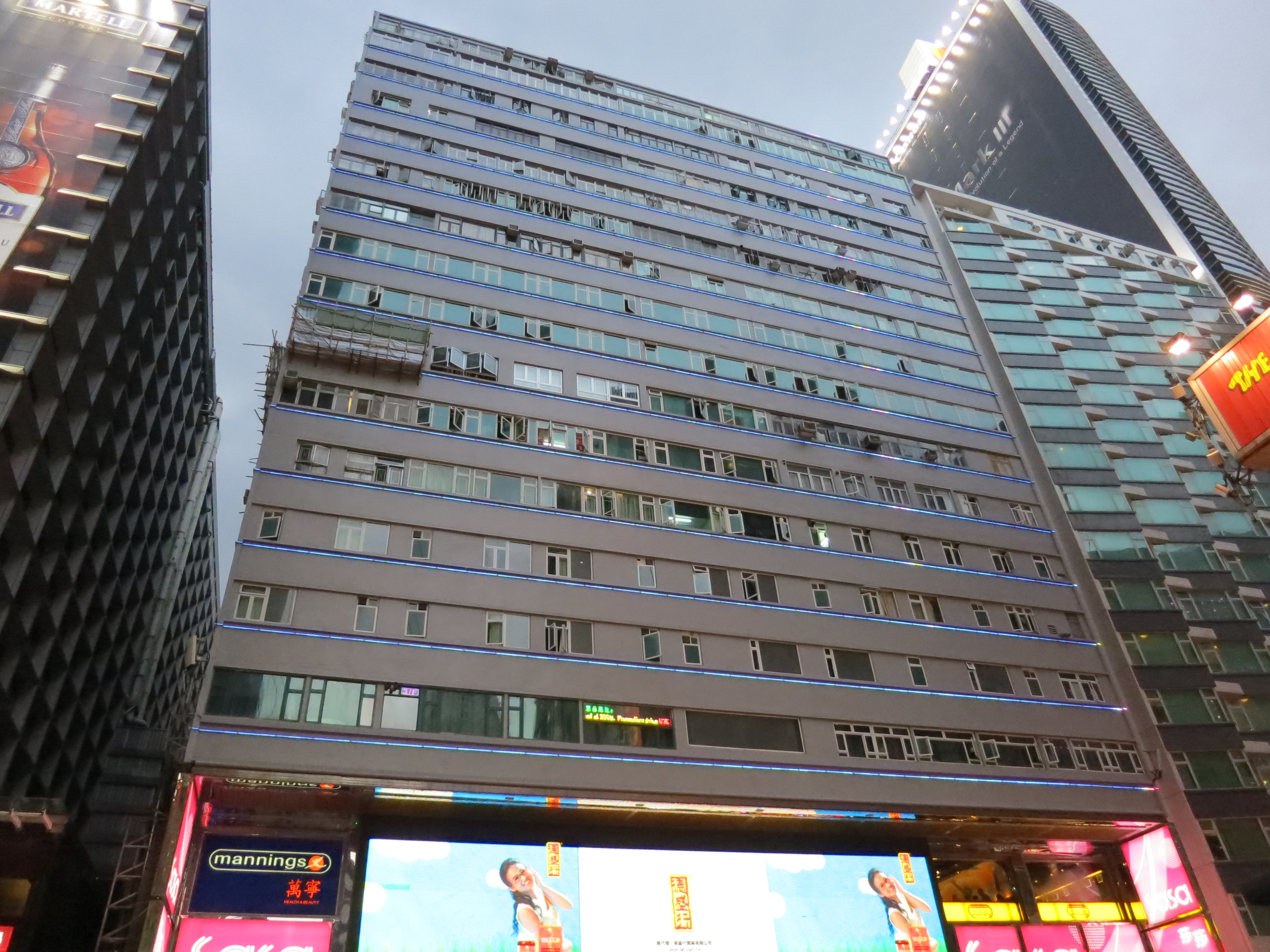
Chungking Mansions, Tsim Sha Tsui

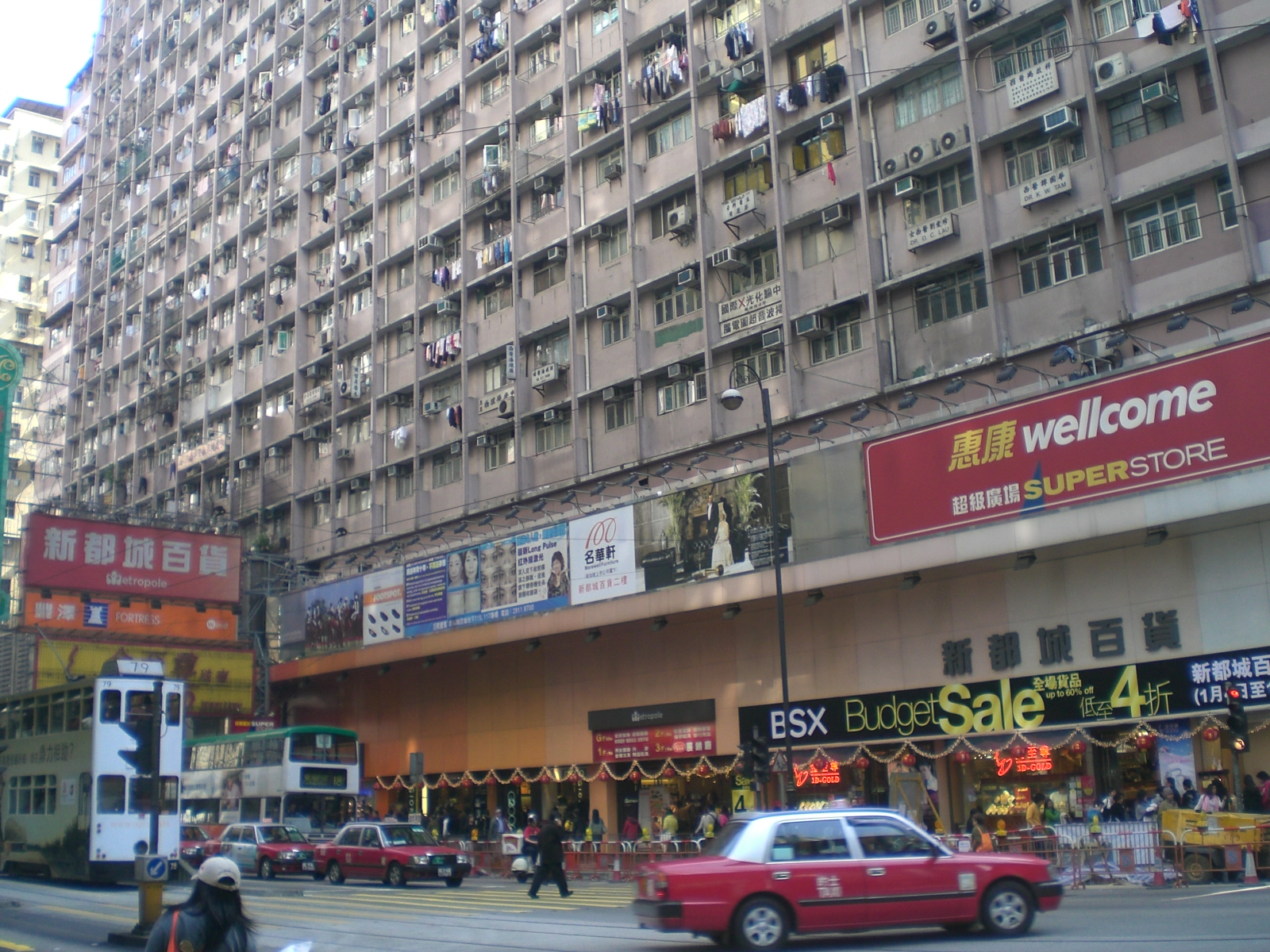
Metropole Building, North Point

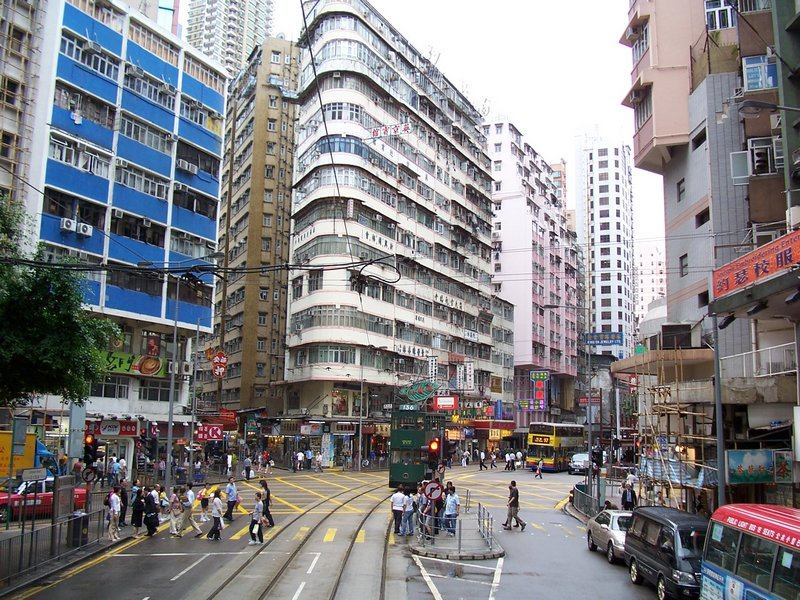
May Wah Building, Wan Chai

== Example ==
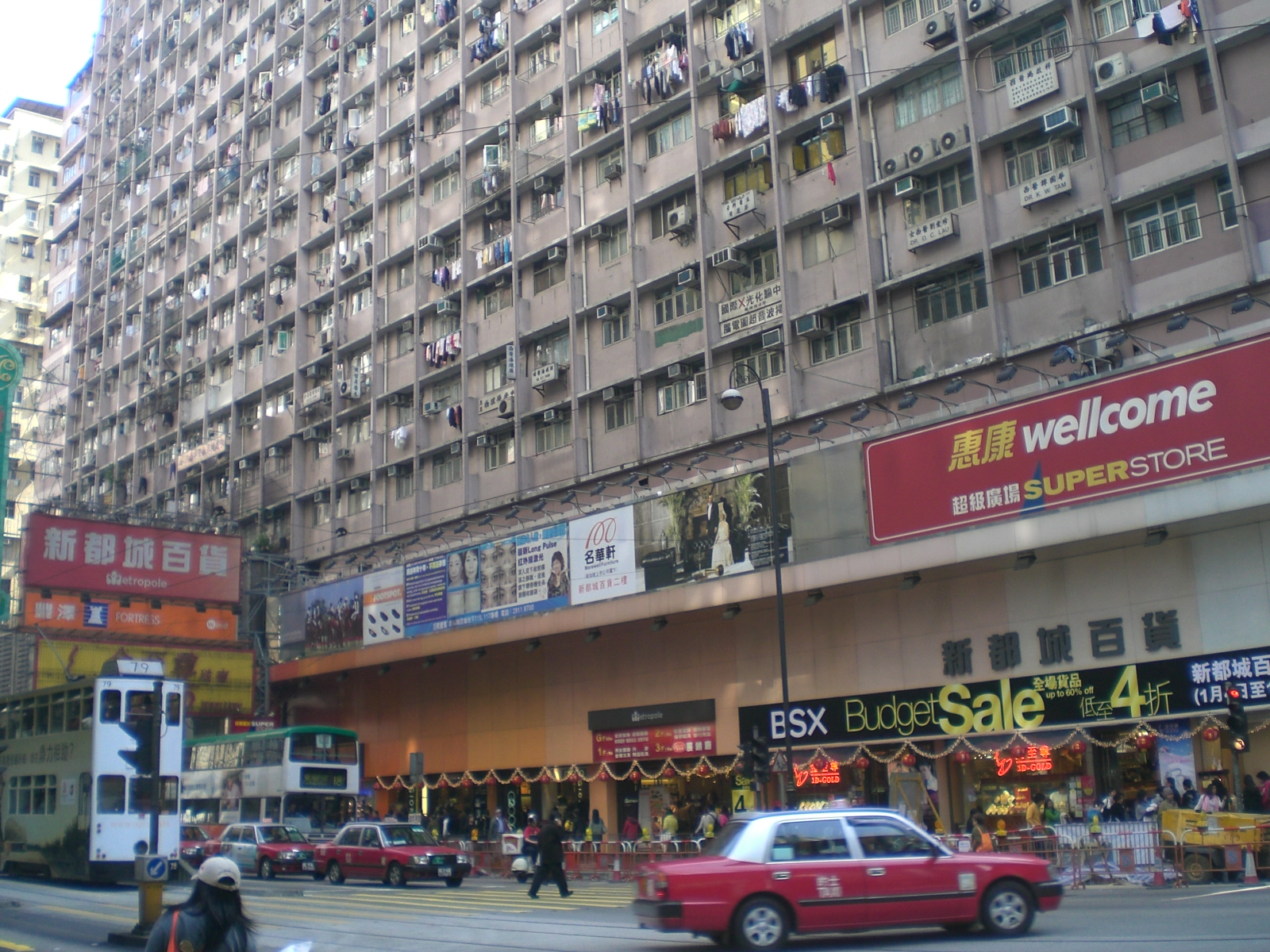
Stores and shops on the ground floor of Metropole Building.

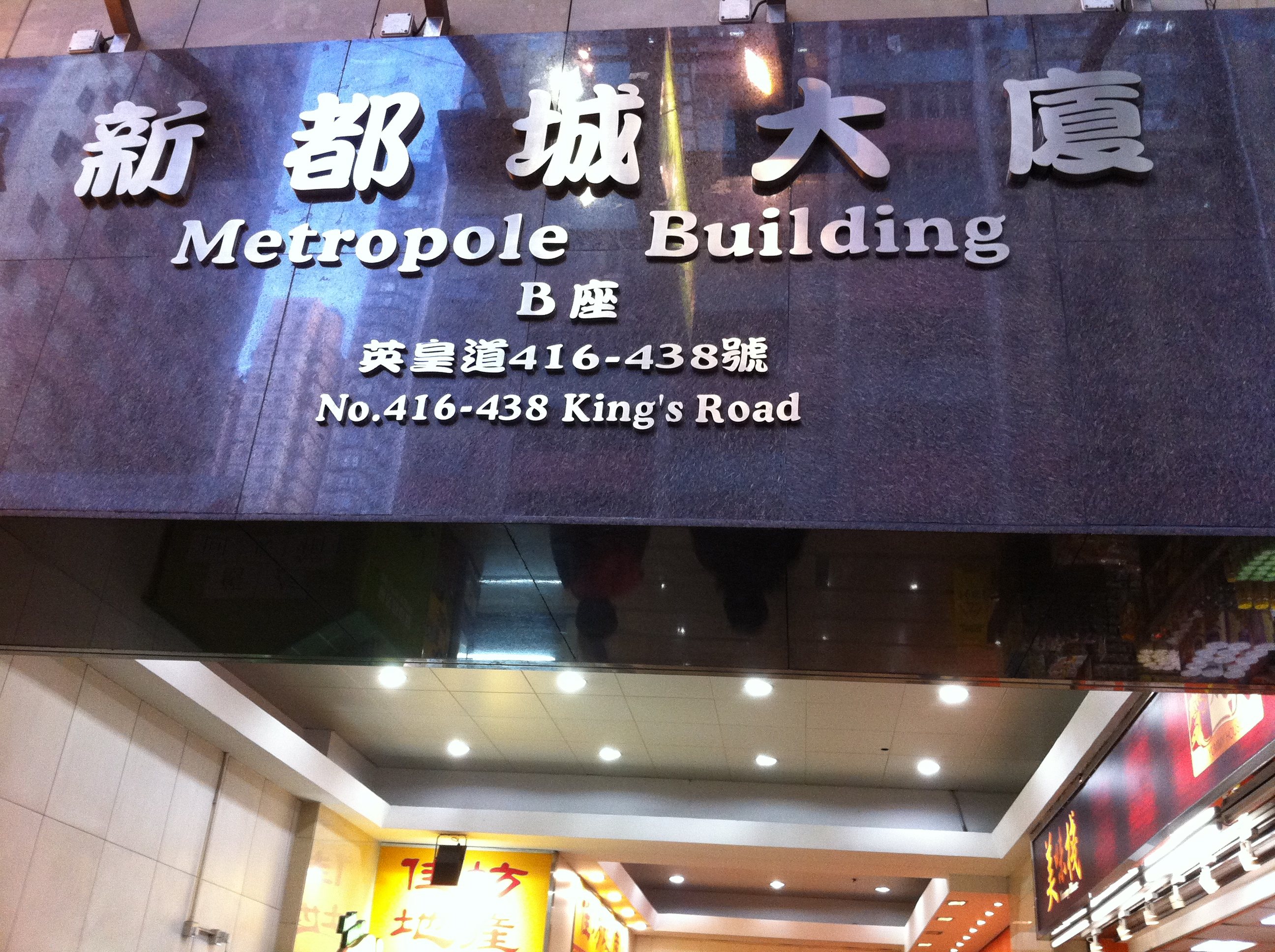
Entrance signage of Metropole Building in English and Chinese.

Metropole Building (Chinese: 新都城大廈) is a composite building in Hong Kong. The Metropole Building used to be a site called Ming Yuen Amusement Park. There are four buildings inside this complex. It was designed by Szeto Wai. The complex is located at 416–438 King's Road, North Point, Hong Kong Island.

The first phase of Metropole Building (Blocks A and B) was built in 1967. The second phase was built in October 1972. The complex is split into four blocks, each with 25 storeys. Blocks B and C are connected with corridors, which are found in the public housing estates. The complex has 1,037 units.

The ground floor to the third floor is home to Metropole Mall, a large, old, shopping place that houses Fu Lum Group, Saizeriya store, Café de Coral shop, Wellcome store, a Jusco shop, Fortress shop, Bossini store, G2000 store and Hung Fook Tong store.

In 2010, Metropole Building underwent a significant renovation. lifts were replaced, and lobbies, corridors, pipes and other facilities were modernized.

During the 1967 Hong Kong riots, the Metropole Building and Kiu Kwan Mansion became a target for leftist rioters. Royal Hong Kong Police and the British Army searched these buildings for suspected leftist rioters.

== See also ==
- 1950s in Hong Kong and
- 1960s in Hong Kong
- Bauhaus
- Floor area ratio
- Corner Houses
- New Lucky House
