= Sham Shui Po Public Dispensary =

Historic building in Hong Kong

Coordinates: 22.3267°N 114.1617°E

- 深水埔公立醫局
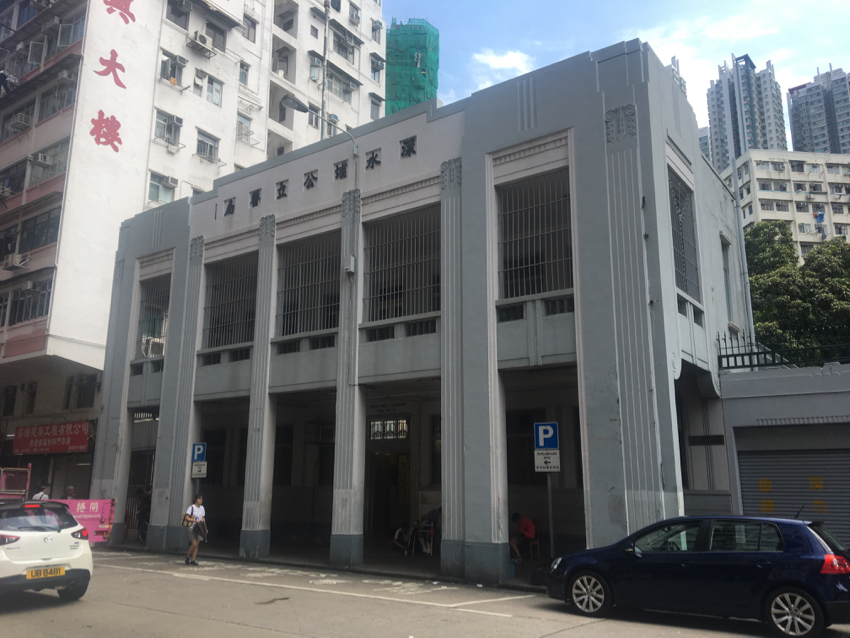
- Sham Shui Po Public dispensary in 2019.
- Interactive map of the Sham Shui Po Public Dispensary area
- Alternative names: Sham Shui Po Methadone Clinic

General information
- Classification: Grade II historical building
- Location: Sham Shui Po, 137 Yee Kuk Street, Hong Kong
- Current tenants: Auxiliary Medical Services
- Completed: 1930s

Technical details
- Floor count: 2

Sham Shui Po Public Dispensary
- Traditional Chinese: 深水埔公立醫局
Transcriptions
Yue: Cantonese
- Yale Romanization: Sām séui bou gūng laahp yī guhk
- Jyutping: Sam1 soei2 bou3 gung1 laap6 ji1 guk6

Sham Shui Po Public Dispensary is two-storey medical complex and Grade II historical building built in the 1930s on Yee Kuk street in Hong Kong.

== History ==
The facility dates to the early 20th century when the community members of Sham Shui Po established a public clinic due to the lack of medical care facilities for local residents.

With the introduction of the government Methadone Treatment Scheme in 1972, the dispensary became one of Hong Kong's methadone treatment centres, and is now known as Sham Shui Po Methadone Clinic and is maintained by Auxiliary Medical Service.
