= Wan Chai Road =

Street in Hong Kong

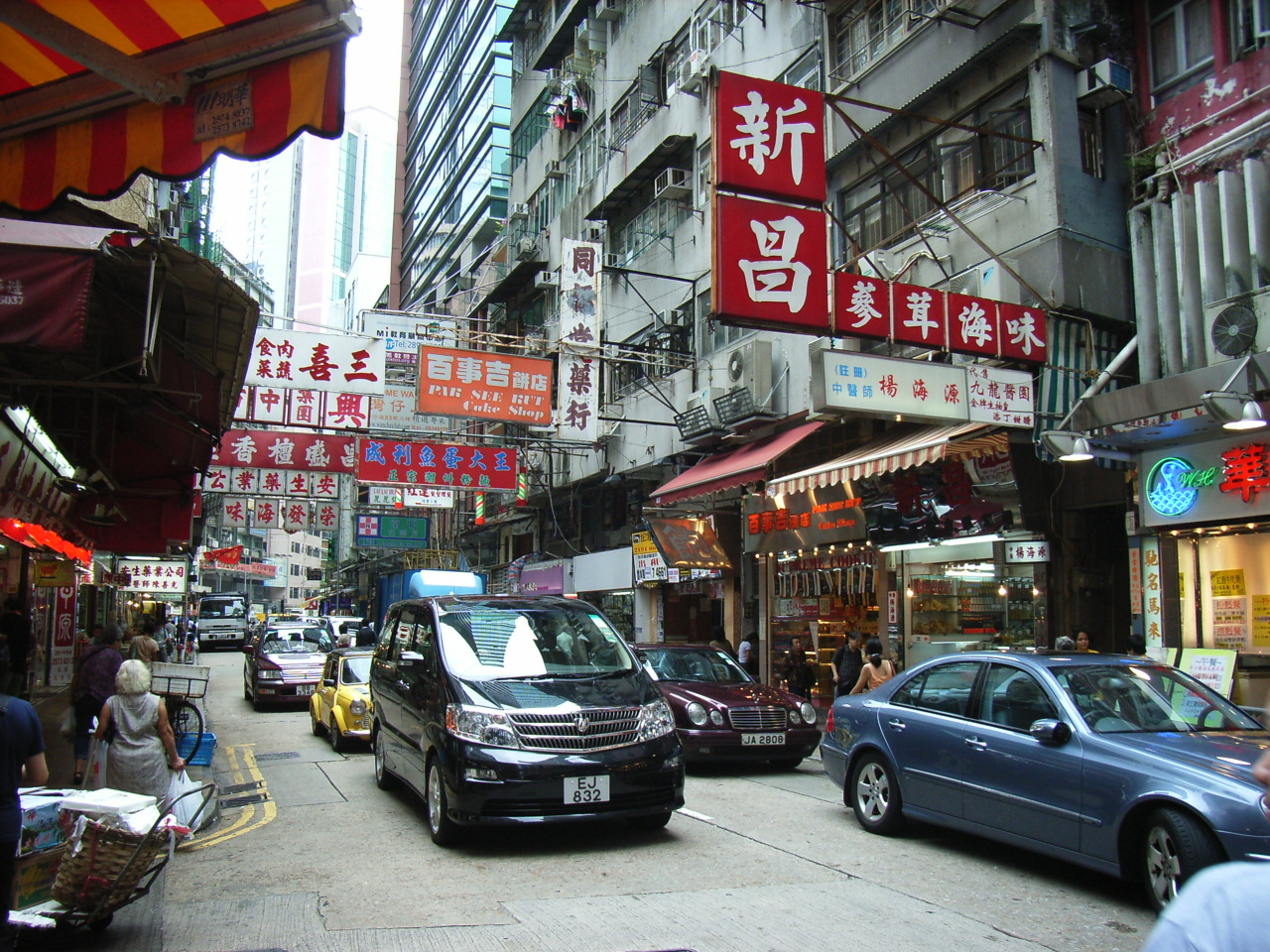
Wan Chai Road in August 2006.

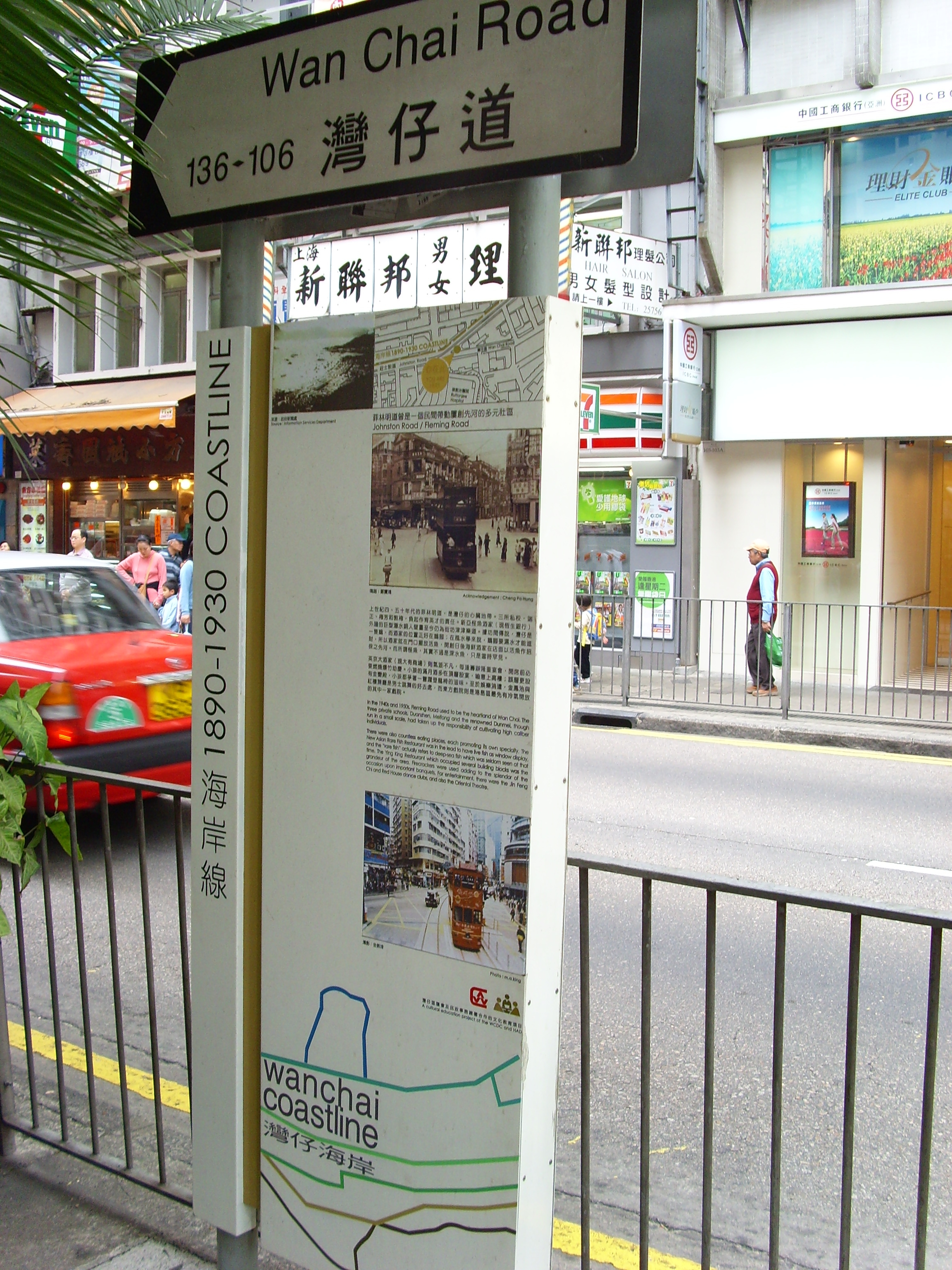
Marker of the historical coastline in Wan Chai Road in March 2008.

Wan Chai Road (灣仔道) is a main road in Wan Chai, on the north side of Hong Kong Island.

Wan Chai Road is a L-shape road which was constructed in 1851 along Morrison Hill from the foot of Hospital Hill (now near the old Wan Chai Market building) to the beach at Observation Point (now near Tin Lok Lane).

The road offers access, via Cross Lane, to Wan Chai Park (灣仔公園), the area's largest.

== History ==
In the 1930 and 1940s, Hong Kong funeral services used to gather in Wan Chai Road and Tin Lok Lane as the area is closed to the cemeteries in Happy Valley. The first funeral parlour in Hong Kong, named Hong Kong Funeral Home, was founded on 216 Wan Chai Road in the early 1930s, opposite a cemetery carving workshop. The coffin showroom was on Tin Lok Lane. On 5 September 1966, Hong Kong Funeral Home moved to Quarry Bay, however, the old parlour of Wan Chai Road still in service until its dismantling in 1967.

== In popular culture ==
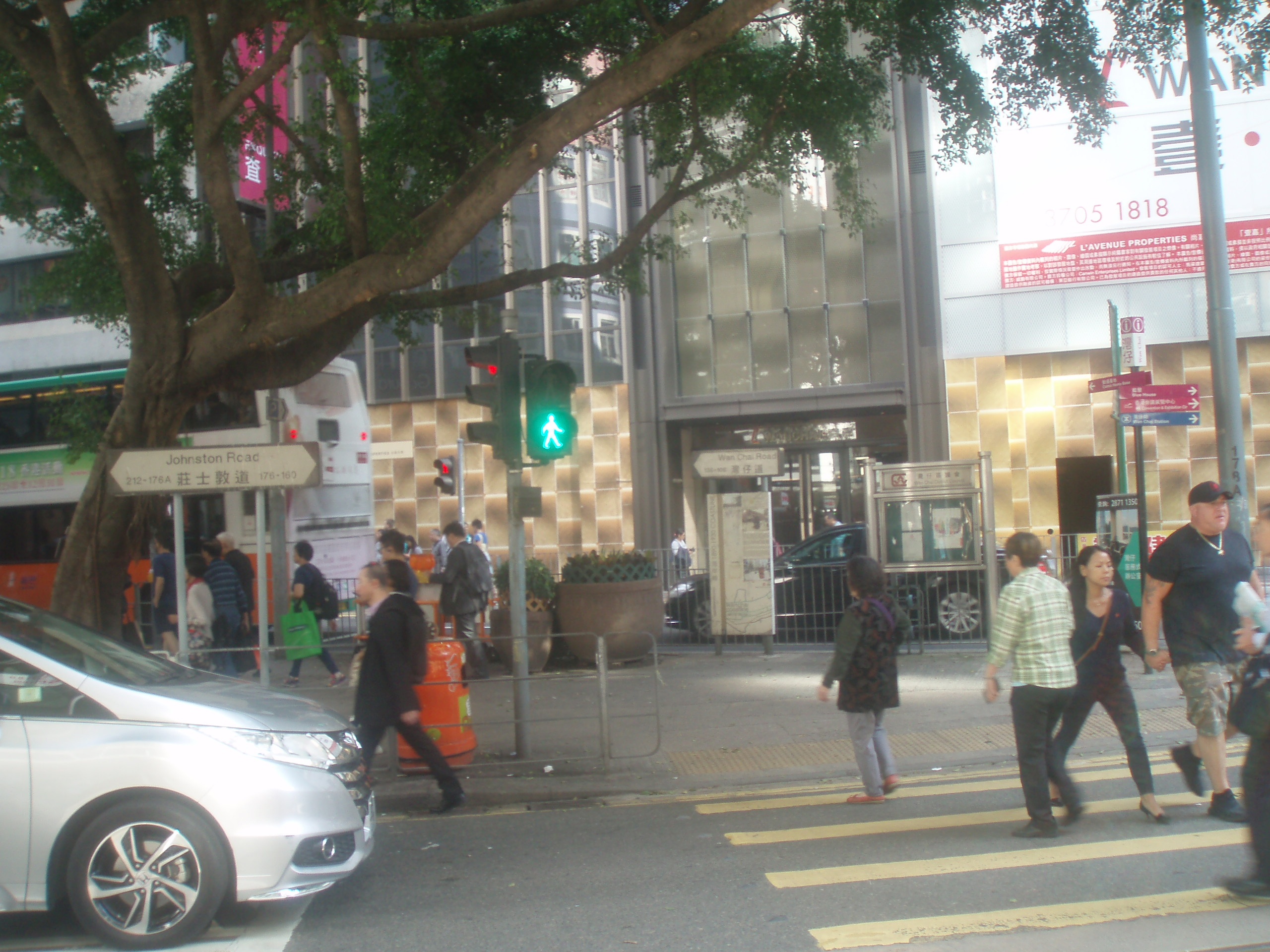
American TV show The Amazing Race 30 has once set a Pit Stop on this road at the junction shown here. Taken in November 2018.

This road and its junction with Johnston Road was a Pit Stop in the eleventh leg of the reality TV show The Amazing Race 30.

== See also ==
- Johnston Road
- Morrison Hill Road
- Land reclamation in Hong Kong
- May Wah Building, at the corner of Johnston Road and Wan Chai Road
