= Tsuen Wan Transport Complex =

Building in Tsuen Wan, Hong Kong

Coordinates: 22.368918°N 114.111471°E

- Traditional Chinese: 荃灣運輸大樓
- Simplified Chinese: 荃湾运输大楼
Transcriptions
Standard Mandarin
- Hanyu Pinyin: Quánwān Yùnshū Dàlóu
Yue: Cantonese
- Jyutping: cyun4 waan1 wan6 syu1 daai6 lau4

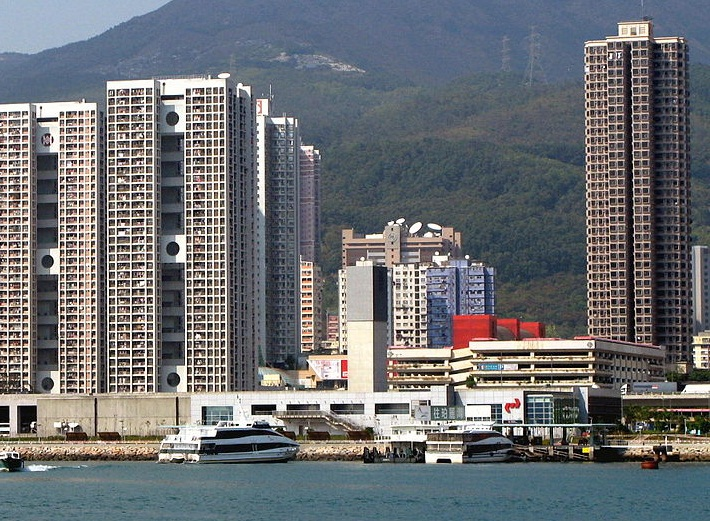
Tsuen Wan skyline with Clague Garden Estate (left), Tsuen Wan Pier, Tsuen Wan West station, Tsuen Wan Transport Complex and Skyline Plaza (right).

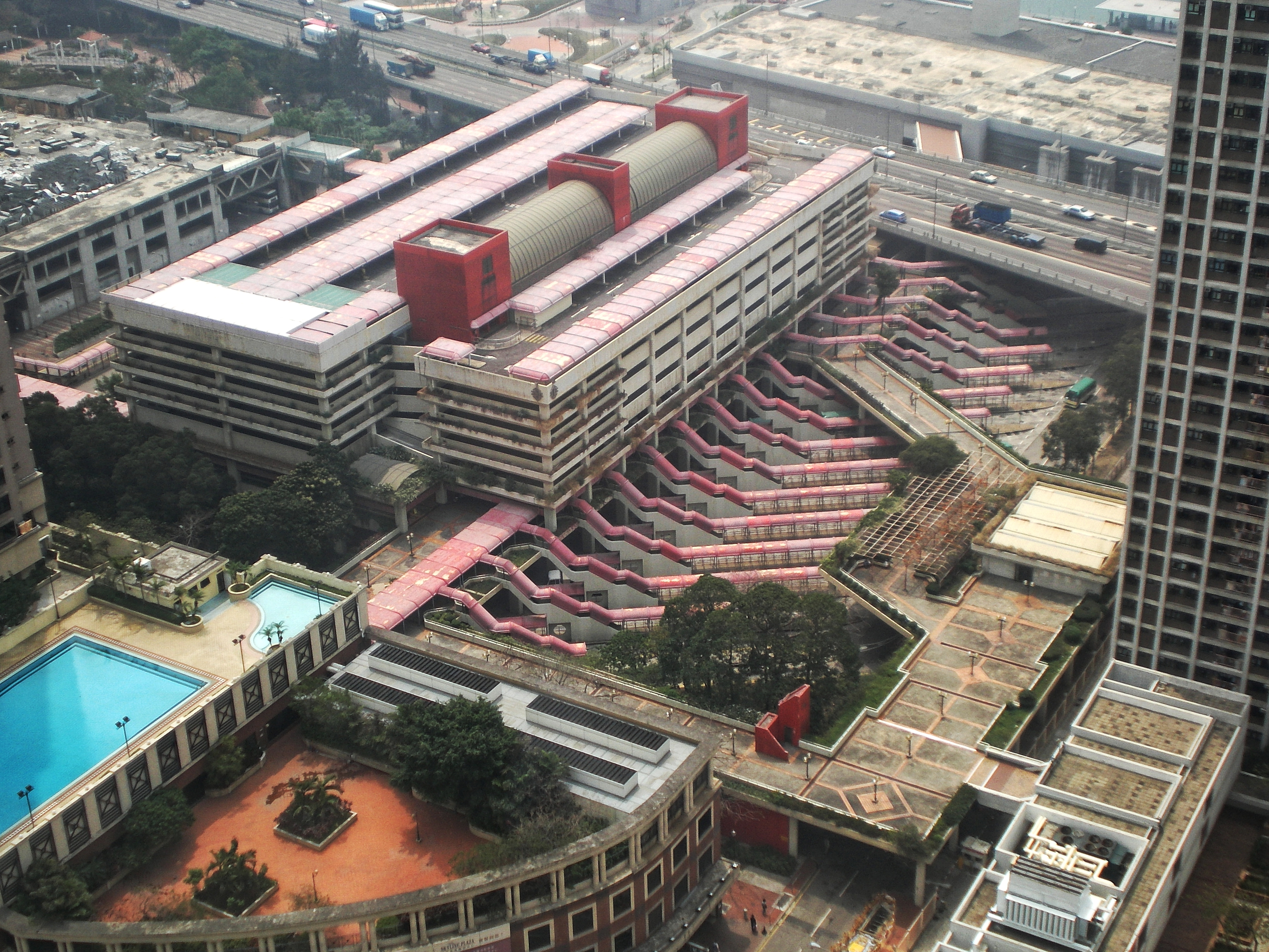
Tsuen Wan Transport Complex in 2008.

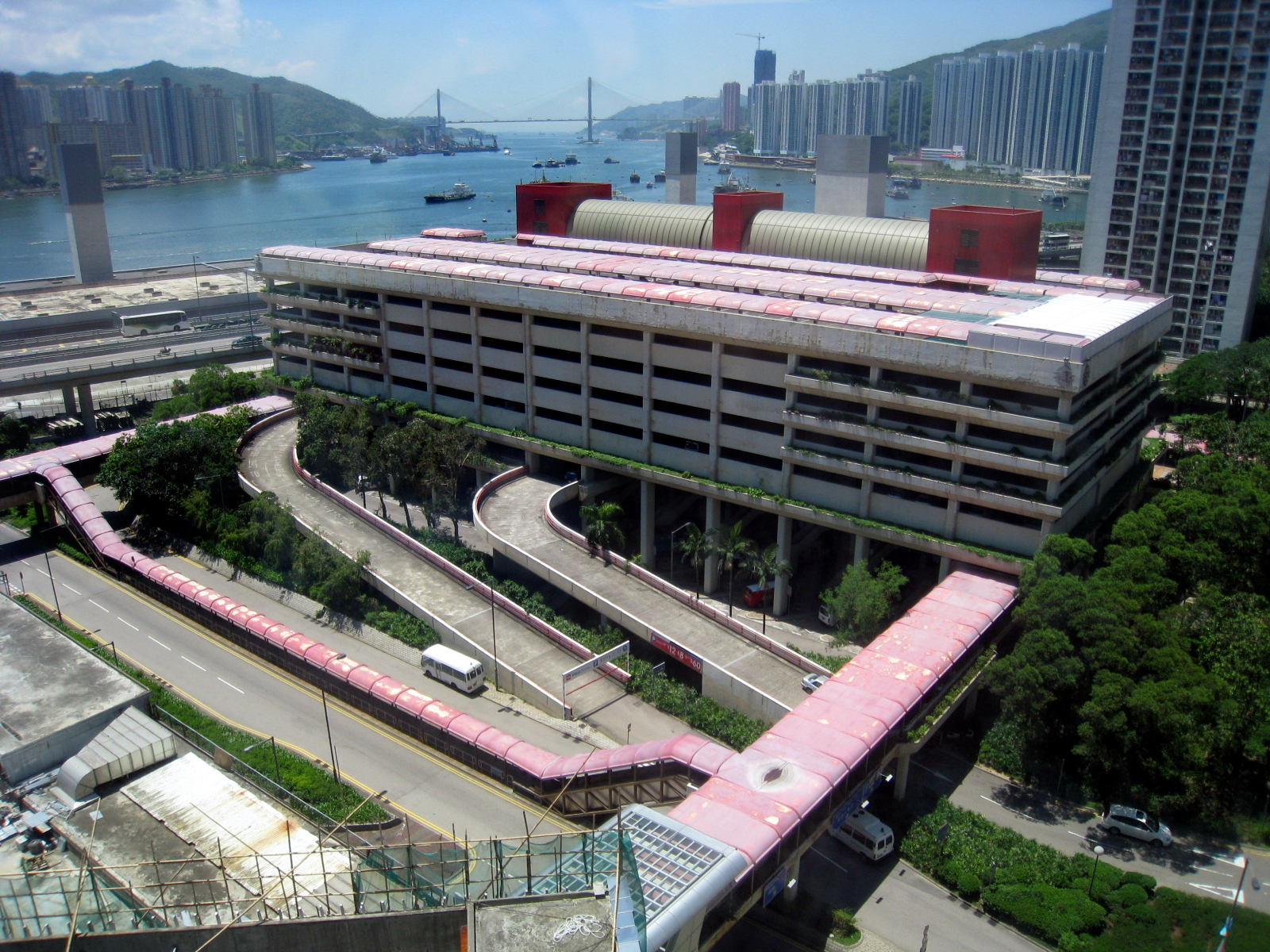
Tsuen Wan Transport Complex in 2008.

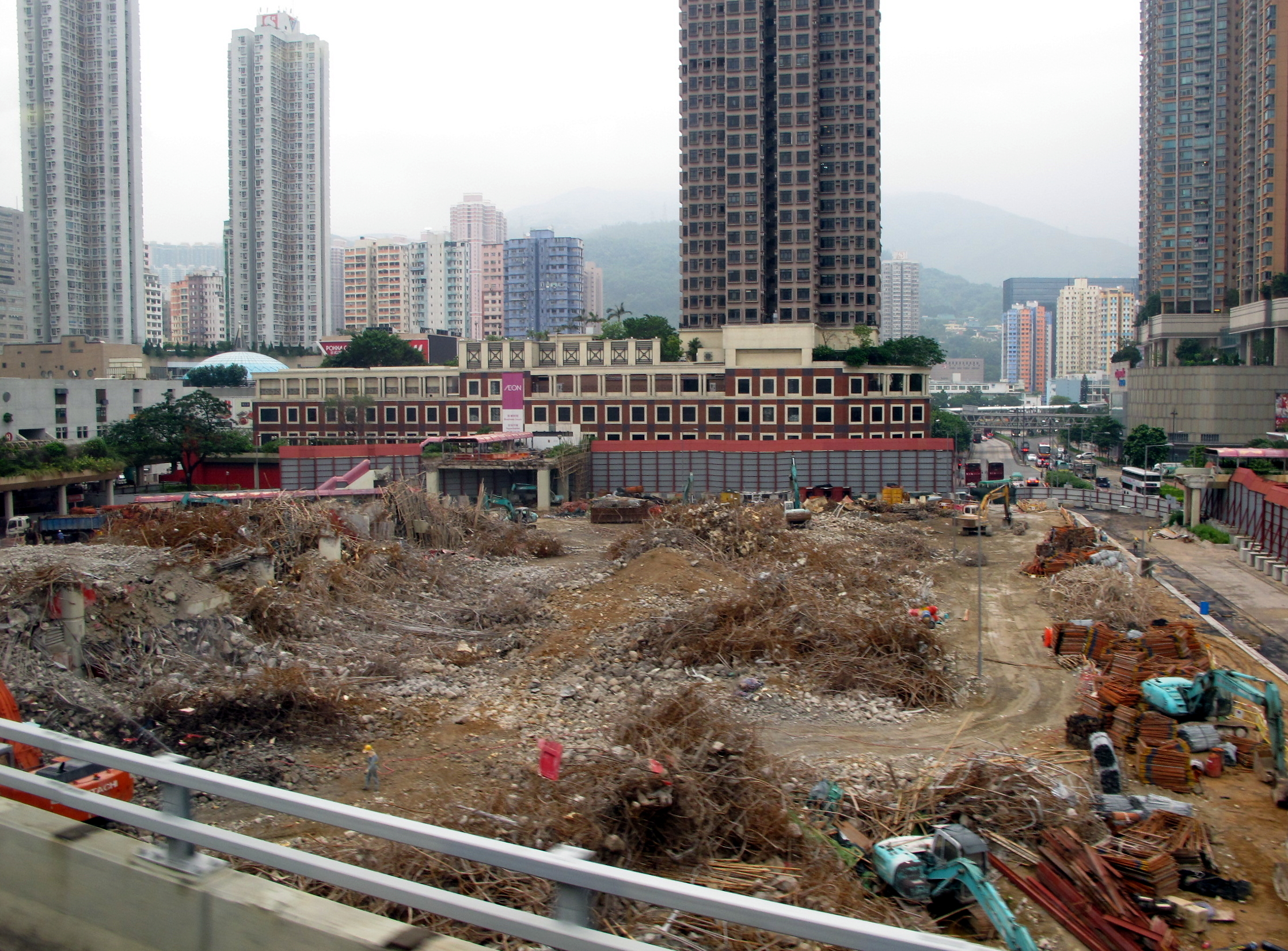
The site of the Complex in September 2013.

Tsuen Wan Transport Complex (Chinese: 荃灣運輸大樓) was a large transport hub in Tsuen Wan, Hong Kong. There was a bus terminus and taxi stand on the ground floor; on top sat a multi-storey car park.

== Location ==
Tsuen Wan Transport Complex was located at No. 98 Tai Ho Road, in South Tsuen Wan, near the shore. When it was completed in 1986, it was located next to the Tsuen Wan Town Hall (completed in 1980) and the Tsuen Wan Ferry Pier (demolished in 2000 and rebuilt further south following land reclamation) in an otherwise mostly undeveloped zone of Tsuen Wan New Town. The surrounding area has since then undergone development, and the building later sat next to Clague Garden Estate (1989), Tsuen Wan West station (2003) and Nina Tower (2007).

== History ==
Construction of the Complex started in 1983. The multi-storey car park opened in April 1986. Starting from 1 May 1997, the multi-storey car park was managed by Wilson Parking, taking over from Metropark, a Wharf subsidiary. A driving school operated on the 9th and 10th floors of the building since 1999. As of 2009, the Complex was planned for demolition or partial demolition under the MTR Corporation's TW5 property development project. A case in 2010 about environment nuisances caused by street sleepers dwelling in the Complex, highlighted the fact that it had been unclear since 1986, which Government Department held management responsibility for the Complex. As of February 2012, most of the bus routes using the Complex had relocated their termini elsewhere, and most of the building had fallen into disuse.

== Features ==
With 778 parking spaces for private cars, the multi-storey car park was, as at December 2011, the second largest Transport Department multi-storey car park after Rumsey Street Car Park.

== Demolition ==
The building was of little use in recent years, especially following the relocation of bus stops in the complex to the new bus terminus not long after the completion of Tsuen Wan West station. As the building occupied the site of further planned residential development (known as the TW5 project, and part of the Tsuen Wan West station property development plan), it was due to be closed on 5 February 2013. The remaining minibus services moved out of the building to the nearby Nina Tower bus / minibus station on 27 January 2013.

The multi-storey car park was closed with effect from 1 February 2013, and the transport complex was subsequently demolished. The site will become host to a new private housing estate called "Cityside", developed by Chinachem Group.

== See also ==
- Murray Road Multi-storey Car Park Building
- Yau Ma Tei Car Park Building
