= Clague Garden Estate =

Public housing estate in Tsuen Wan, Hong Kong

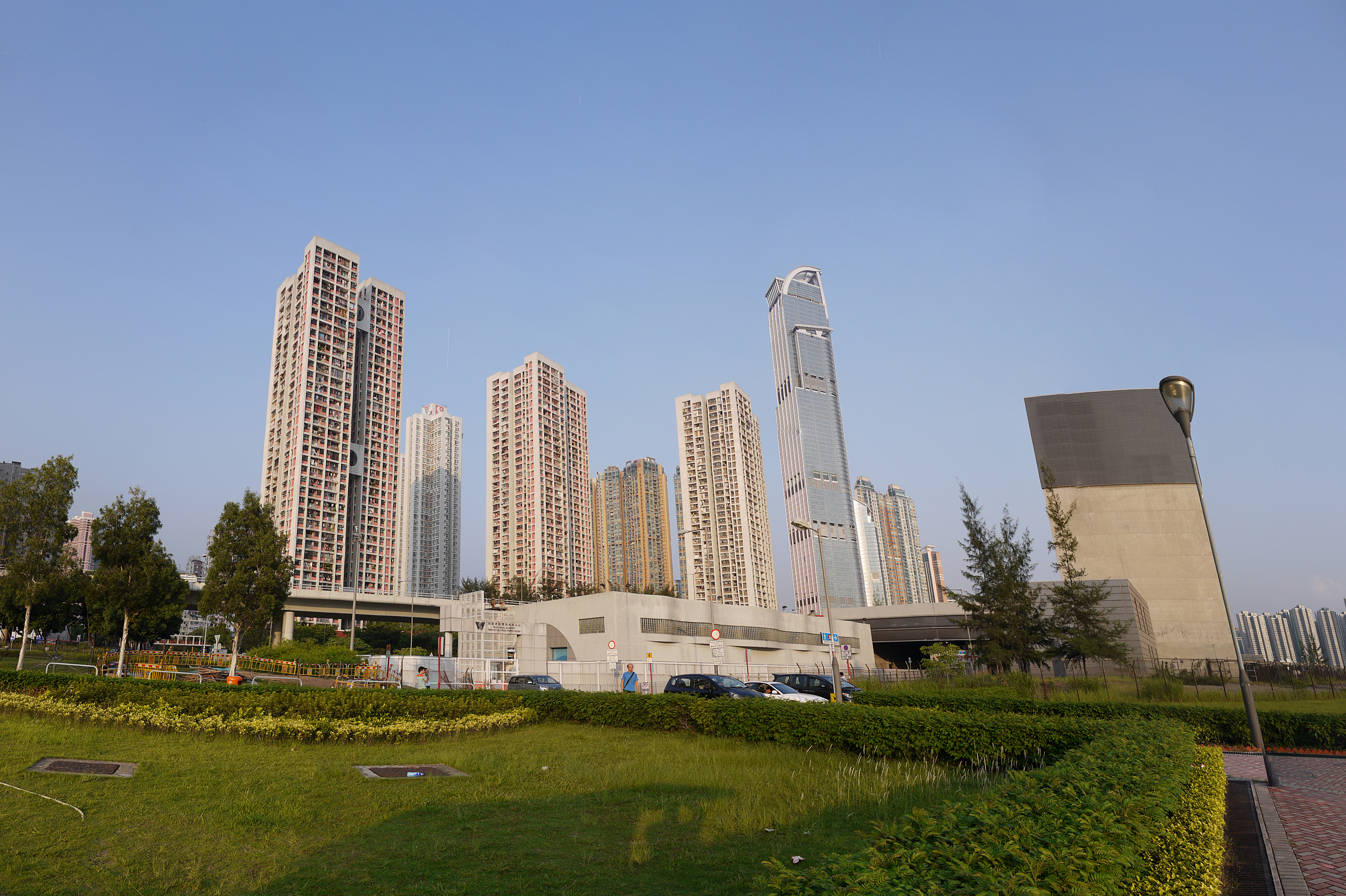
- Clague Garden Estate
- Interactive map of Clague Garden Estate

General information
- Location: 22-30 Hoi Shing Road, Tsuen Wan; New Territories, Hong Kong
- Coordinates: 22.3701977°N 114.110359°E
- Status: Completed
- Category: Public rental housing
- No. of blocks: 3
- No. of units: 1,479

Construction
- Constructed: 1989; 37 years ago
- Authority: Hong Kong Housing Society

Clague Garden Estate (Chinese: 祈德尊新邨) is a Flat-for-Sale Scheme public housing estate in Tsuen Wan, New Territories, Hong Kong located on reclaimed land near Tsuen Wan Pier and MTR Tsuen Wan West station. It now consists of three residential buildings, built in 1989 by Hong Kong Housing Society. It offers 552 flats for rent and 926 under the Flat-for-Sale Scheme. Many early residents were resettled from the Four Seasons Estate, a nearby public housing estate that was demolished in 1990.

== Background ==
The estate was named for Sir Douglas Clague, the ex-chairman of Hong Kong Housing Society and the former head of Hutchison International. It received a Certificate of Merit at the 1991 Hong Kong Institute of Architects Annual Awards.

== Politics ==
Clague Garden Estate is located in Clague Garden constituency of the Tsuen Wan District Council. It was formerly represented by Chan Kim-kam, who was elected in the 2019 elections until July 2021.

== See also ==
- Public housing estates in Tsuen Wan
