= Tsuen Wan Pier =

Ferry pier in Hong Kong

Coordinates: 22.3669°N 114.1102°E

- Traditional Chinese: 荃灣碼頭
- Simplified Chinese: 荃湾码头
Transcriptions
Standard Mandarin
- Hanyu Pinyin: Quánwān Mǎtóu
Yue: Cantonese
- Jyutping: cyun4 waan1 maa5 tau4

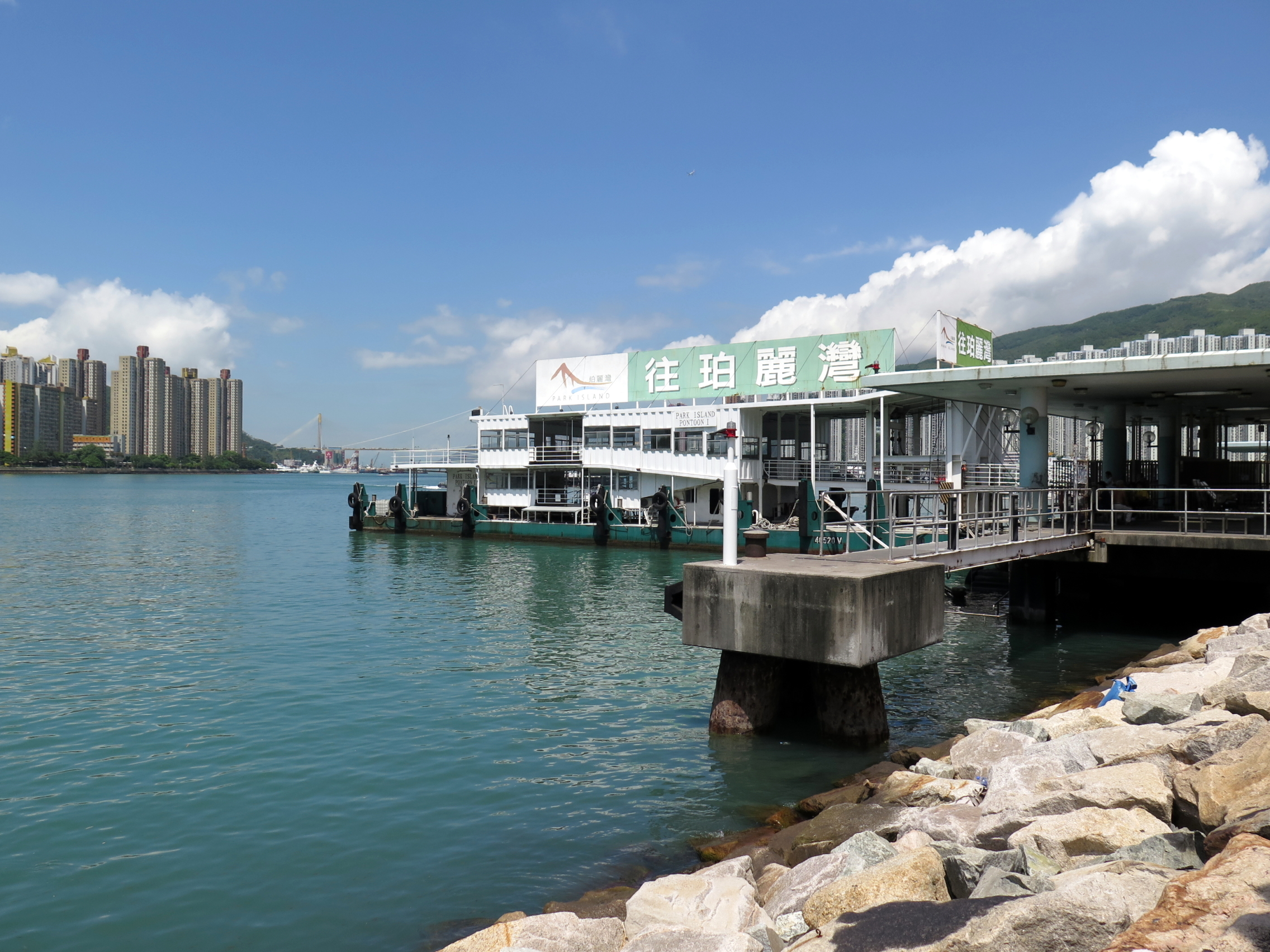
Tsuen Wan Pier

Tsuen Wan Pier, Tsuen Wan Ferry or Tsuen Wan Ferry Pier is a public pier at the south of Tsuen Wan, New Territories, Hong Kong, which is adjacent to the MTR Tsuen Wan West station. It provided ferry service to Central via Tsing Yi, but the service ceased operation in 2000 after Western Harbour Crossing and MTR Tung Chung line were commissioned to provide faster route between New Territories West and Hong Kong Island.

== History ==
The pier has been developed over four cycles.

Its first generation commenced in 1935, but it was destroyed by the Imperial Japanese Army in 1942 during Japanese occupation of Hong Kong.

Its second generation commenced in 1958 and was located near modern-day Nina Tower on Yeung Uk Road. It was demolished in 1983 due to reclamation for the construction of Tsuen Wan Road and Clague Garden Estate.

Its third generation, located at the reclamation area outside Tsuen Wan Road, commenced in 1983, alongside the Tsuen Wan Transport Complex and Tsuen Wan Ferry Bus Terminus. It provided four ferry routes, Tsuen Wan to Tsing Yi, Tsuen Wan to Central, Tsuen Wan to Central via Tsing Yi and Tsuen Wan to Tai O ferry services. But it was demolished in 2000 due to the reclamation for the construction of Tsuen Wan West station. The ferry routes also ceased operation.

Its fourth generation, i.e. the current pier, commenced in 2002 and is located at outside Tsuen Wan West station.

A ferry route travelling between the pier and Park Island, a private housing estate in Ma Wan, is operated by Park Island Transport Company Limited. It was briefly discontinued on 13 December 2012., but was reinstated with 3 sailings per day from 8 June 2013 onwards.

== Facilities ==
Two bus terminus and one minibus terminus are located at nearby Nina Tower, Tsuen Wan West station and Tsuen Wan Transport Complex respectively. Also, Hong Kong Immigration Department Tsuen Wan branch office (relocated to Waterside Plaza in 1999 and closed in 2003) and a driving school (relocated to Kwun Tong Pier in 2006) were located at Tsuen Wan Transport Complex.
