= Yau Ma Tei Car Park Building =

Former multi-storey car park in Hong Kong

Coordinates: 22.309187°N 114.170437°E

- Traditional Chinese: 油麻地停車場大廈
- Simplified Chinese: 油麻地停车场大厦
Transcriptions
Standard Mandarin
- Hanyu Pinyin: Yóumádì Tíngchēchǎng Dàshà
Yue: Cantonese
- Jyutping: jau4 maa4 dei6*2 ting4 ce1 coeng4 daai6 haa6

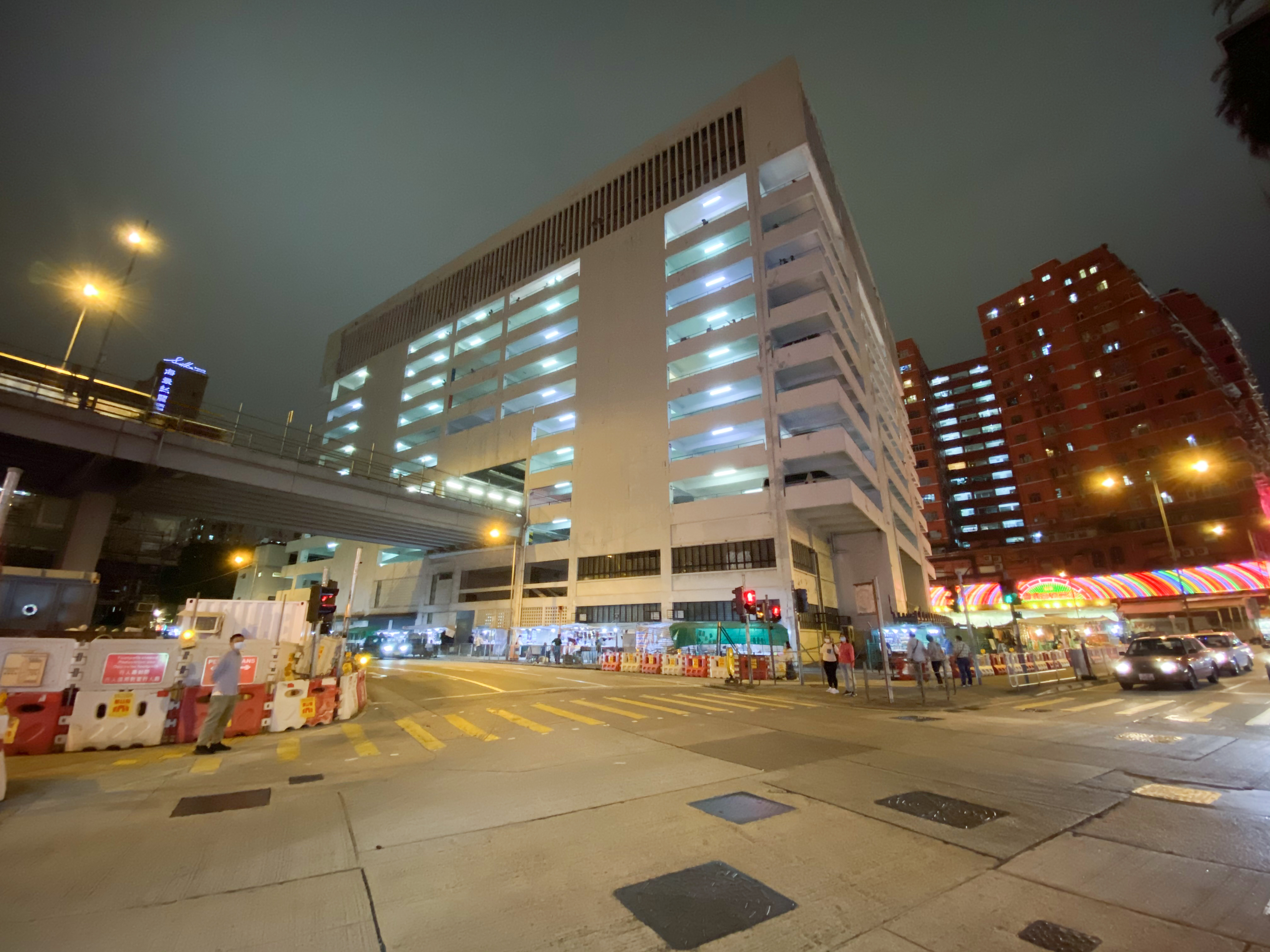
Yaumatei Carpark Building in October 2020.

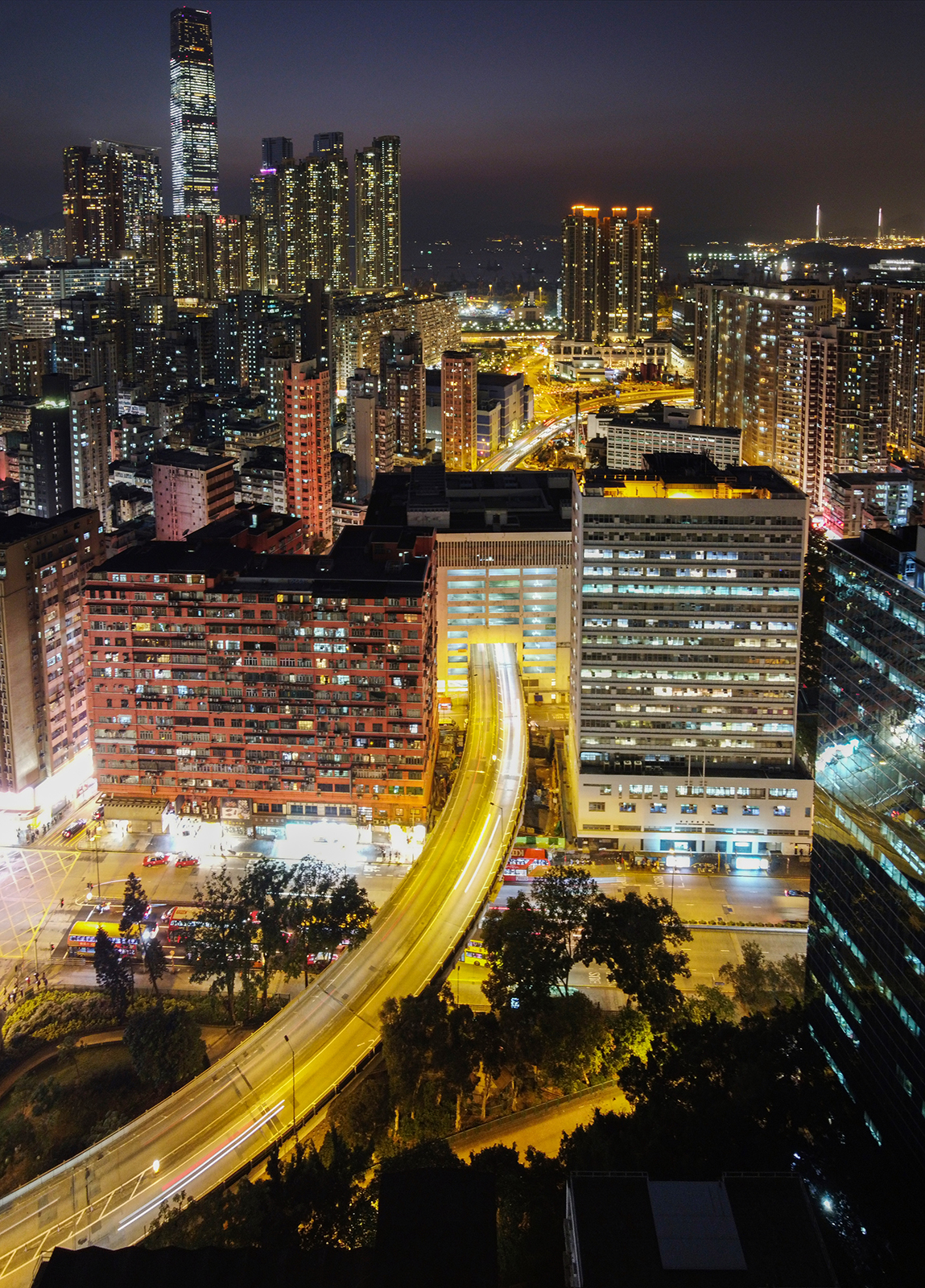
An overhead viaduct carries the West Kowloon Corridor through the Yaumatei Carpark Building.

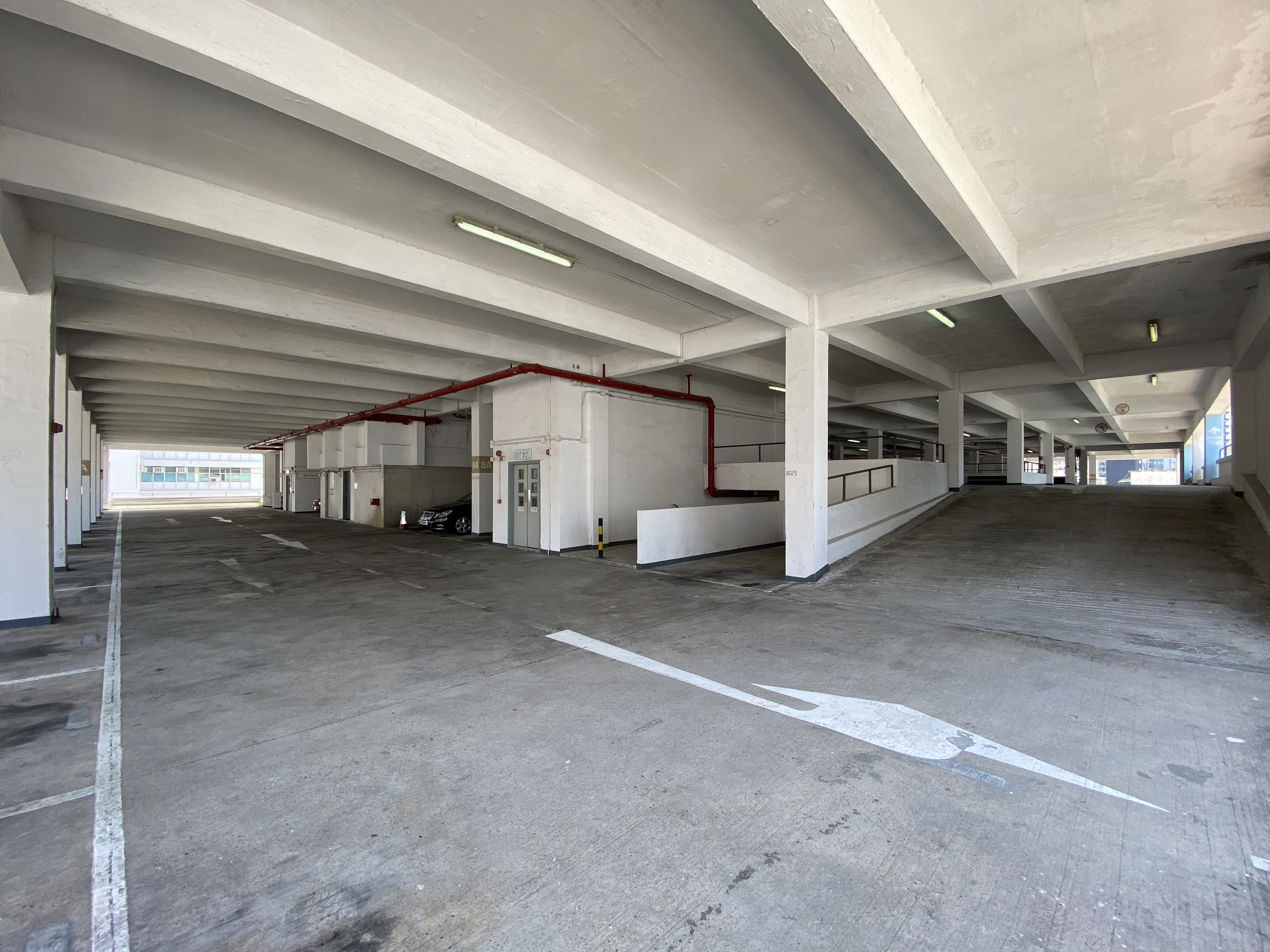
Interior of Yau Ma Tei Car Park Building. Level 8.

Yau Ma Tei Car Park Building (Chinese: 油麻地停車場大廈) was a public multi-storey car park located at No. 250 Shanghai Street, Yau Ma Tei, Yau Tsim Mong District, Hong Kong. From 1970 to 2020, it provided parking spaces to the public in the bustling Yau Tsim Mong area.

The building was demolished to facilitate the construction of the Central Kowloon Bypass. The demolition began in late 2020 and ended on 6 September 2023.

== History ==
The Yau Ma Tei Car Park Building and the nearby Yau Ma Tei Government Office occupy the former site of an old market, after which the adjacent Market Street (街市街), considered one of the oldest streets in Kowloon, is named. The market was relocated to the Yau Ma Tei Market (油麻地街市), built in 1957 along Kansu Street.

The Yau Ma Tei Car Park Building opened in early 1970. In 1977, the Gascoigne Road Flyover was built to bypass existing surface roads and go through the building.

A contract for works including the demolition of the Yau Ma Tei Car Park Building was signed on 6 March 2018 between the Highways Department and Build King-SKEC Joint Venture. The car park was closed in phases starting on 1 November 2020, and finally ceased operation on 1 January 2021. By the time of its closure, the car park was providing 388 public parking spaces for private cars and 55 for motorcycles.

== Features ==
The Gascoigne Road Flyover, part of the West Kowloon Corridor, passes through the building.

Yau Ma Tei Car Park has 770 parking spaces for private cars and 76 parking spaces for motorcycles.

The building also once housed government offices and facilities, as well as non-governmental offices. They include:

- Yau Ma Tei Public Library on the lower floors
- Government offices on the uppermost floors
- Hong Kong branch of the United Nations High Commissioner for Refugees on the 9th floor.

== See also ==
- Murray Road Multi-storey Car Park Building
- Tsuen Wan Transport Complex
