= Tsuen Wan West station =

MTR station in the New Territories, Hong Kong

Tsuen Wan West 荃灣西
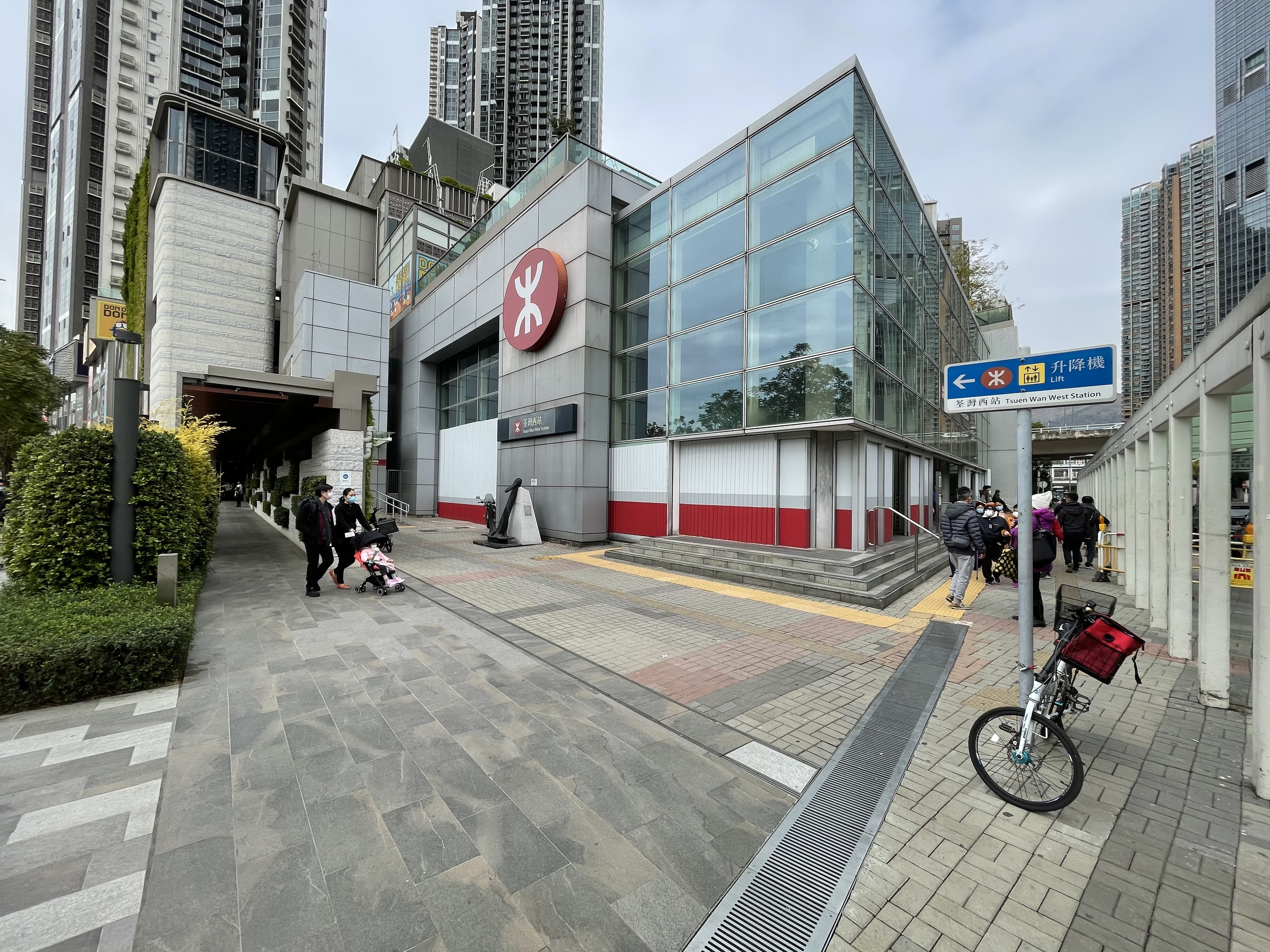
- Exterior of Tsuen Wan West station in 2021

Chinese name
- Traditional Chinese: 荃灣西
- Simplified Chinese: 荃湾西
- Cantonese Yale: Chyùnwāansāi
Transcriptions
Standard Mandarin
- Hanyu Pinyin: Quánwānxī
Yue: Cantonese
- Yale Romanization: Chyùnwāansāi
- Jyutping: Cyun4waan1sai1

General information
- Location: Tsuen Wan Pier, Tsuen Wan; Tsuen Wan District, Hong Kong
- Coordinates: 22°22′07″N 114°06′35″E
- System: MTR rapid transit station
- Owner: KCR Corporation
- Operator: MTR Corporation
- Line: Tuen Ma line
- Platforms: 2 (2 side platforms)
- Tracks: 2
- Connections: Bus, minibus

Construction
- Structure type: Underground
- Platform levels: 1
- Accessible: Yes
- Architect: Farrells

Other information
- Station code: TWW

History
- Opened: 20 December 2003; 22 years ago
- Electrified: 25 kV 50 Hz AC (Overhead line)

Services
Preceding station	MTR	Following station
Kam Sheung Road towards Tuen Mun	Tuen Ma line	Mei Foo towards Wu Kai Sha
Route map
Location
- Location within MTR

Tsuen Wan West is an underground MTR station in Tsuen Wan, New Territories, Hong Kong. It is located between Mei Foo and Kam Sheung Road stations on the Tuen Ma line. There is an emergency platform on the southern side of the station.

There is a large bus and minibus interchange above the station, connecting it with most residential areas, factories, and shopping centres in the area. With the opening of new developments in central Tsuen Wan such as the 80 storey Nina Tower, Vision City, and City Point, traffic to the station has increased. Additional MTR property development on nearby lands such as City Point and Pavilion Bay also commenced circa 2014.

== History ==
The construction of the station was very complex. It required the diversion of some roads, the demolition of two factories, part of a nearby park, and the relocation of a ferry pier which originally occupied the site. The station was designed by Farrells. The waterfront promenade built along with the station's construction connected the two ends of Tsuen Wan, significantly improved the scenery of the area, and provided a leisure place for many residents of southern and western Tsuen Wan.

Although the station is in the same region as Tsuen Wan station, the two stations have different fares. For example, passengers have to pay HK$1.7-4.0 more if they are going to Hong Kong Island, although it is faster and more convenient. Only out-of-system interchange is available for the pair.

On 20 December 2003, Tsuen Wan West station opened to the public with the first phase of the KCR West Rail.

On 27 June 2021, the West Rail line merged with the Ma On Shan line (which was already extended into the Tuen Ma line Phase 1 at the time) in East Kowloon to form the new Tuen Ma line, as part of the Shatin to Central Link project. Hence, Tsuen Wan West is now an intermediate station on the Tuen Ma line.

== Station layout ==
U1	Exit C	Exits C3, C4, C5 footbridge to Tsuen Wan Transport Complex
G	exits	Exits A, B, C1, C2, D, E, transport interchange
C/L1	concourse	customer service centre, shops, vending machines, photo-taking booth, automatic teller machines
P/L2	side platform, Door will open on the left
P/L2	Platform 2	Tuen Ma line towards Wu Kai Sha (Mei Foo)
P/L2	Platform 1	Tuen Ma line towards Tuen Mun (Kam Sheung Road)
P/L2	side platform, Door will open on the left
P/L2	-	Siding

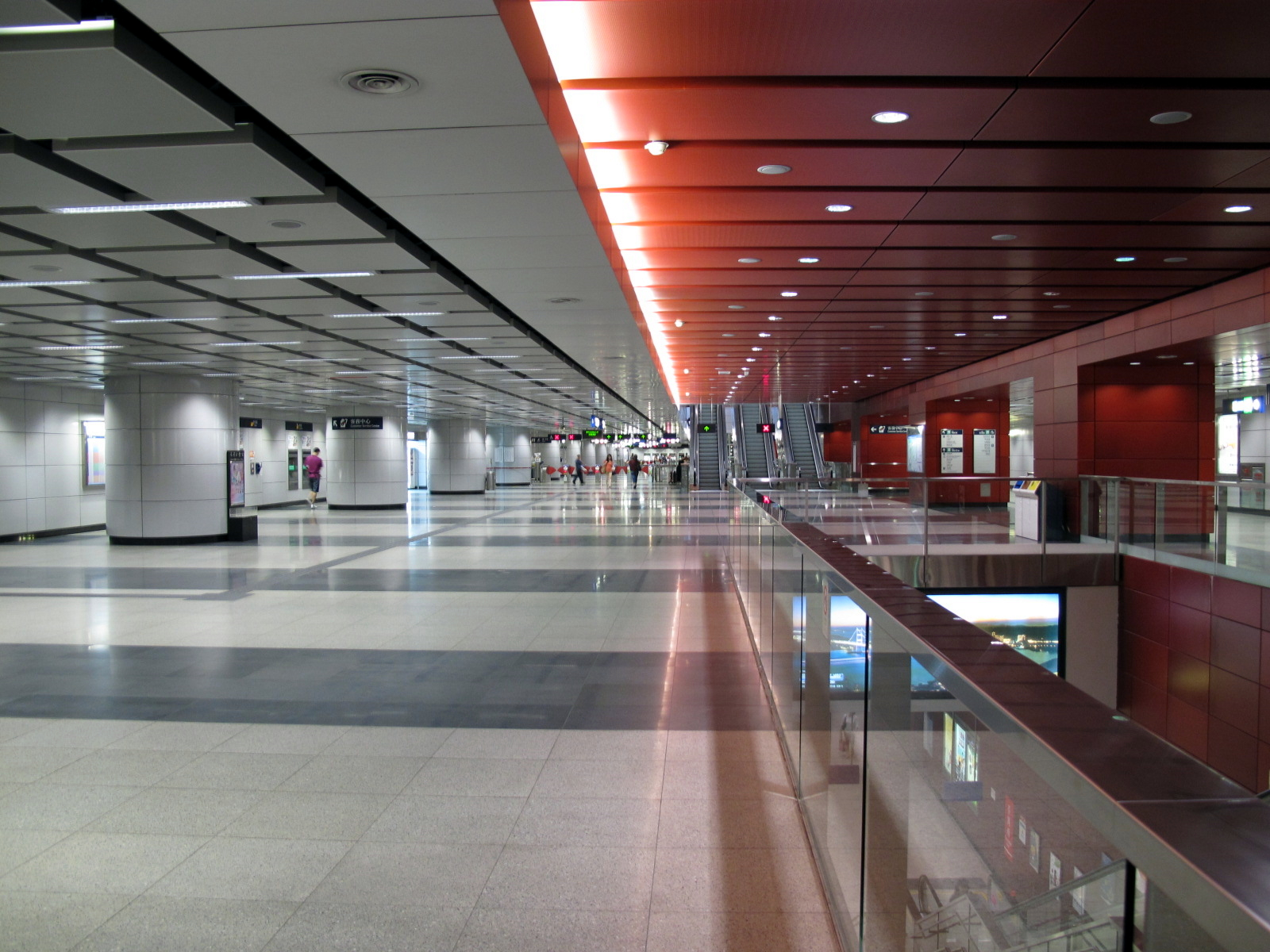
Concourse in May 2011

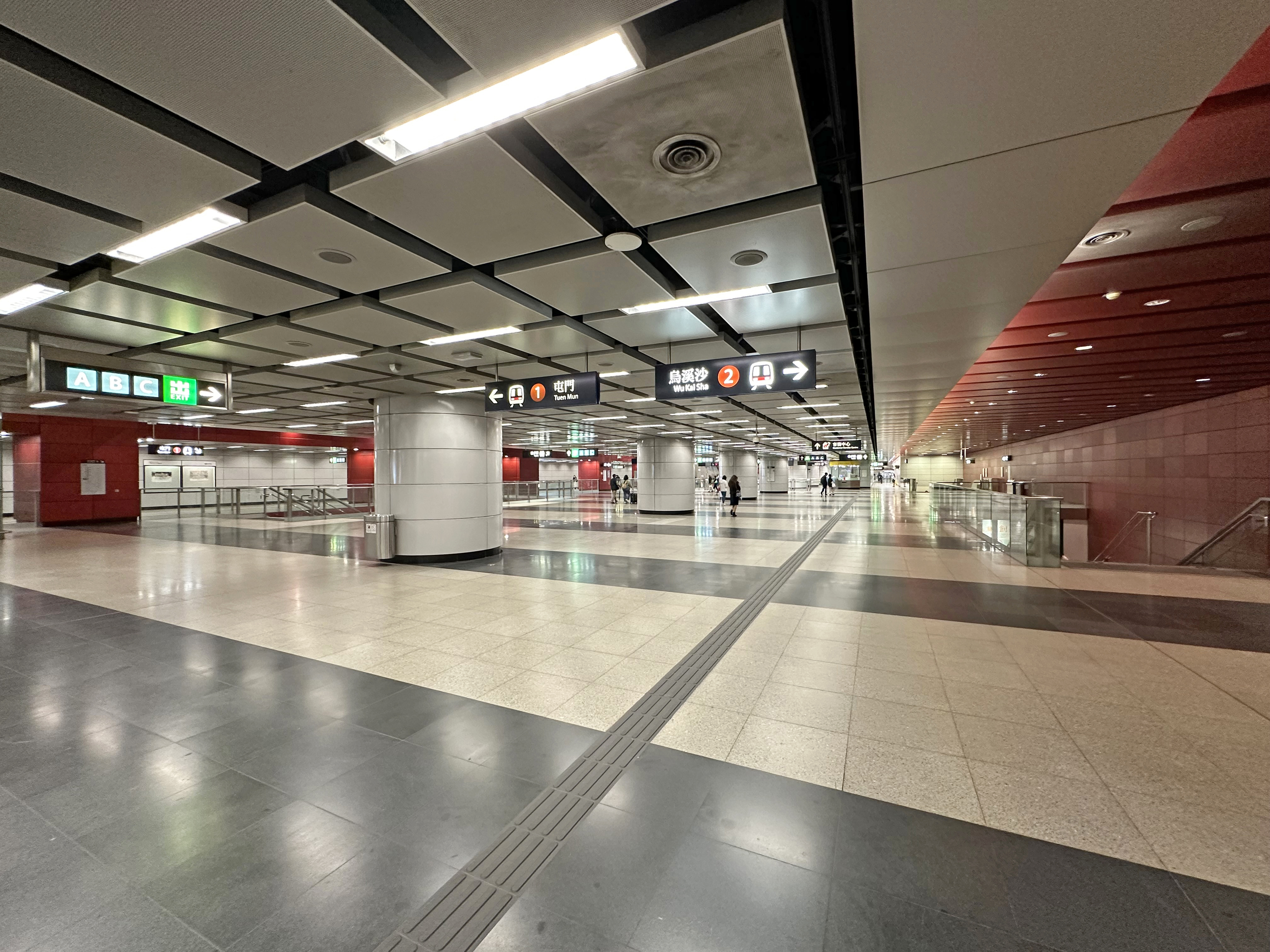
Concourse in December 2023

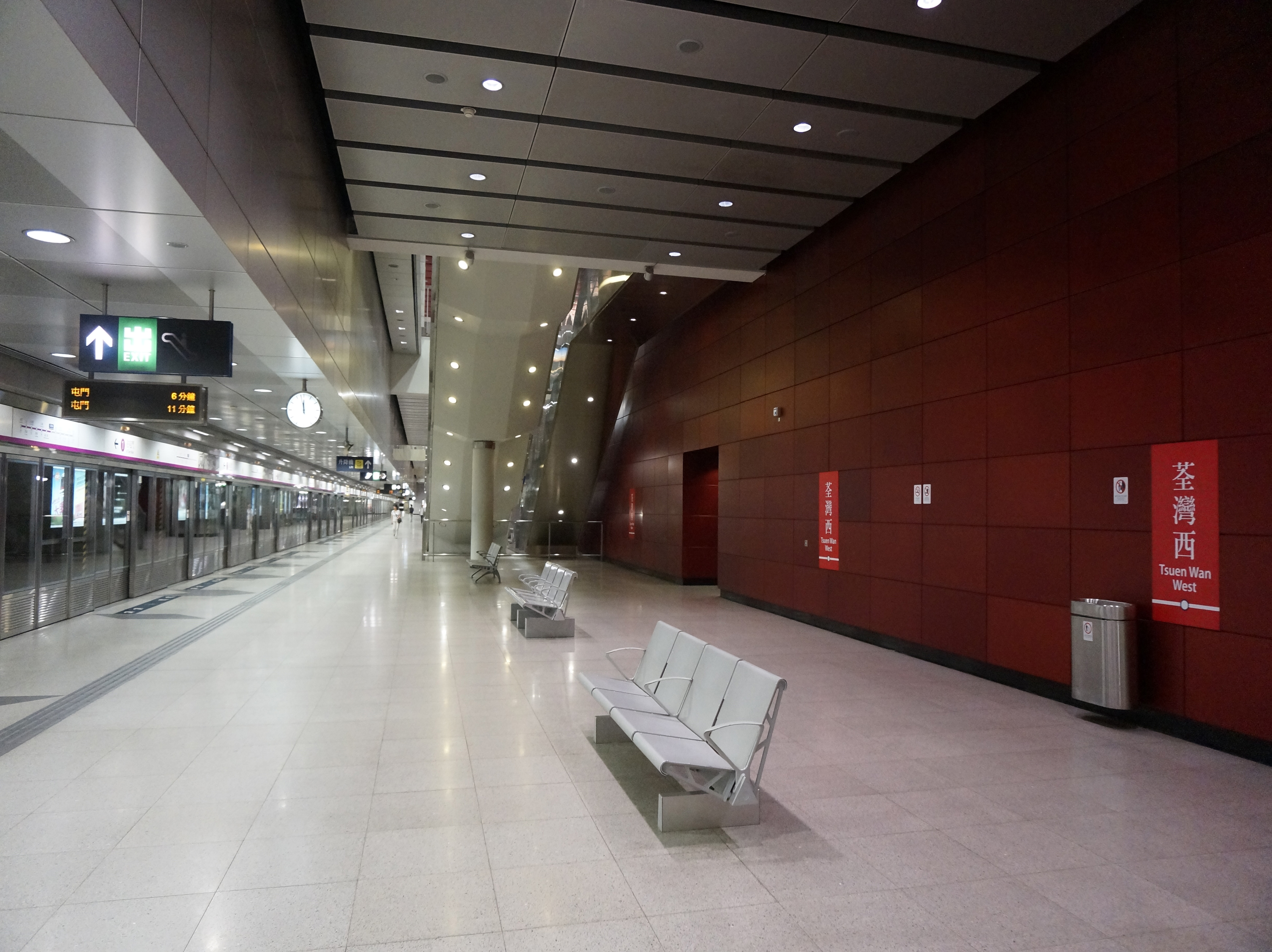
Platform 1 in July 2013

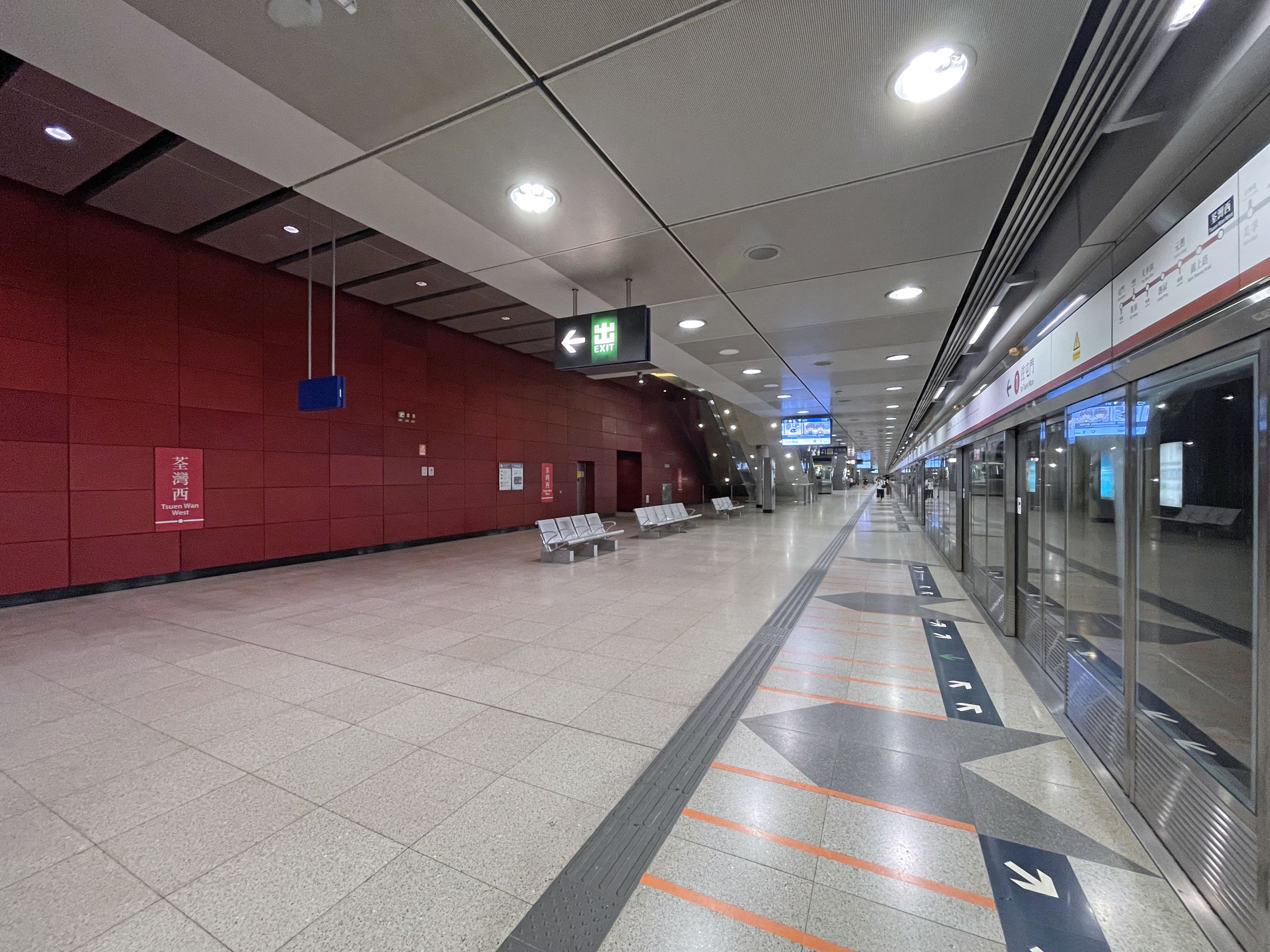
Platform 1 in June 2021

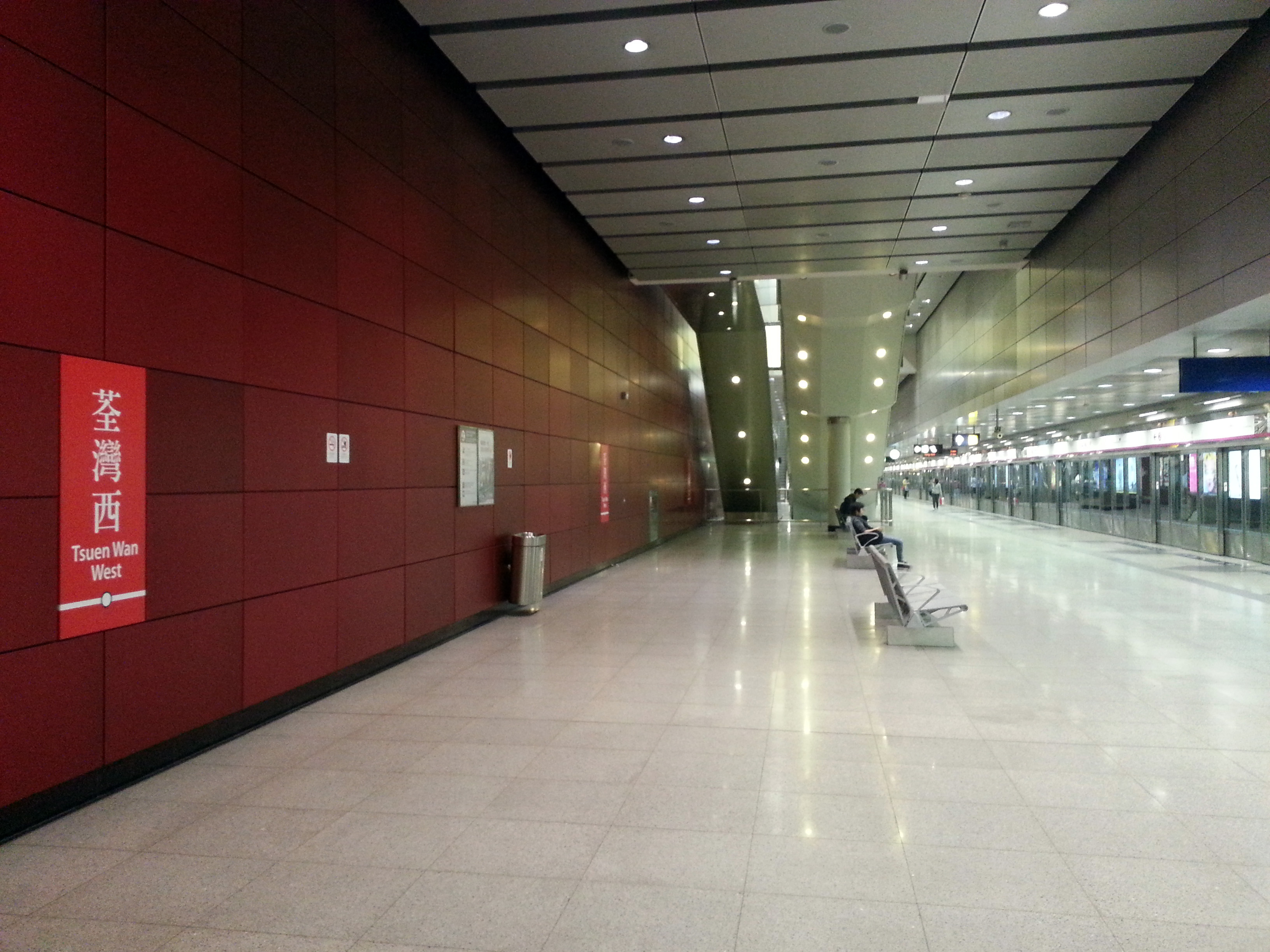
Platform 2 in March 2013

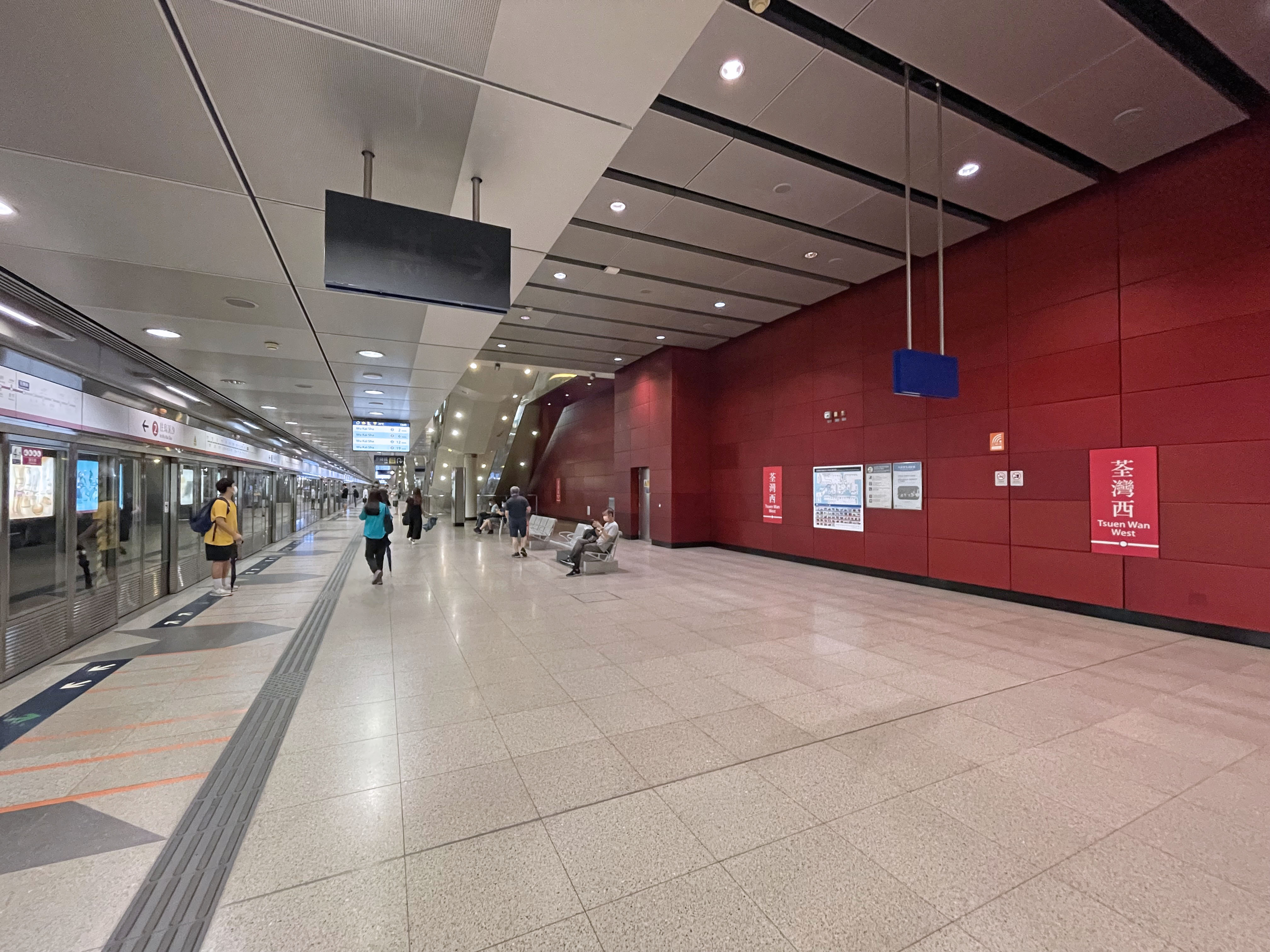
Platform 2 in June 2021

== Entrances/exits ==
- A1: Tsuen Wan West Station Public Transport Interchange
- A2: Clague Garden Estate
- B1: Belvedere Garden, Cable TV Tower
- B2: Station Carpark
- C1: Waterfront Walkway
- C2: OP Mall
- C3: Parc City
- C4: OP Mall
- C5: Waterfront Walkway
- D: Tsuen Wan Pier
- E1: Tsuen Wan West Station Public Transport Interchange
- E2: Hoi Kwai Road
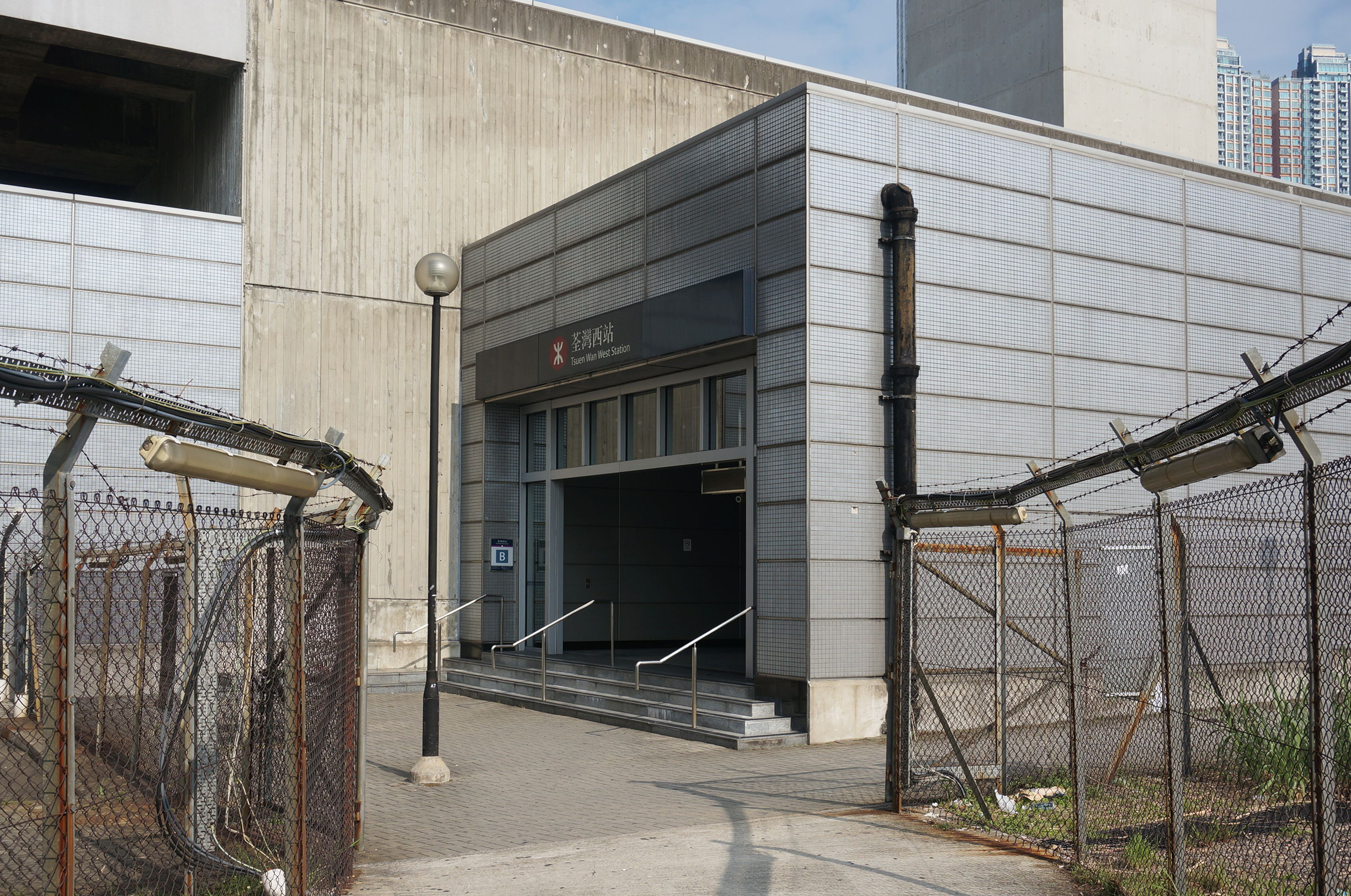
Exit B in October 2012, this exit is closed in 2019

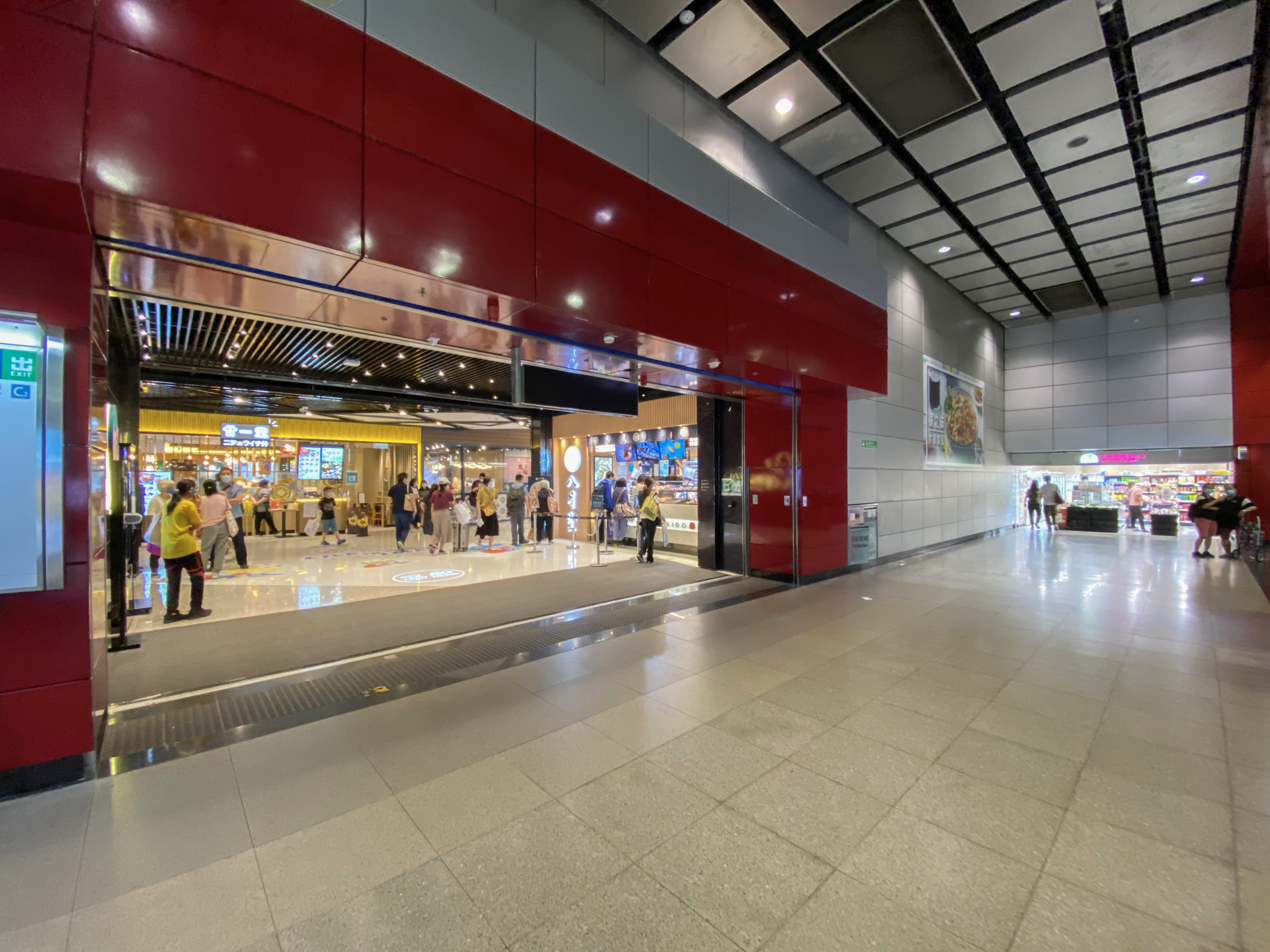
Exit C linkage to OP Mall

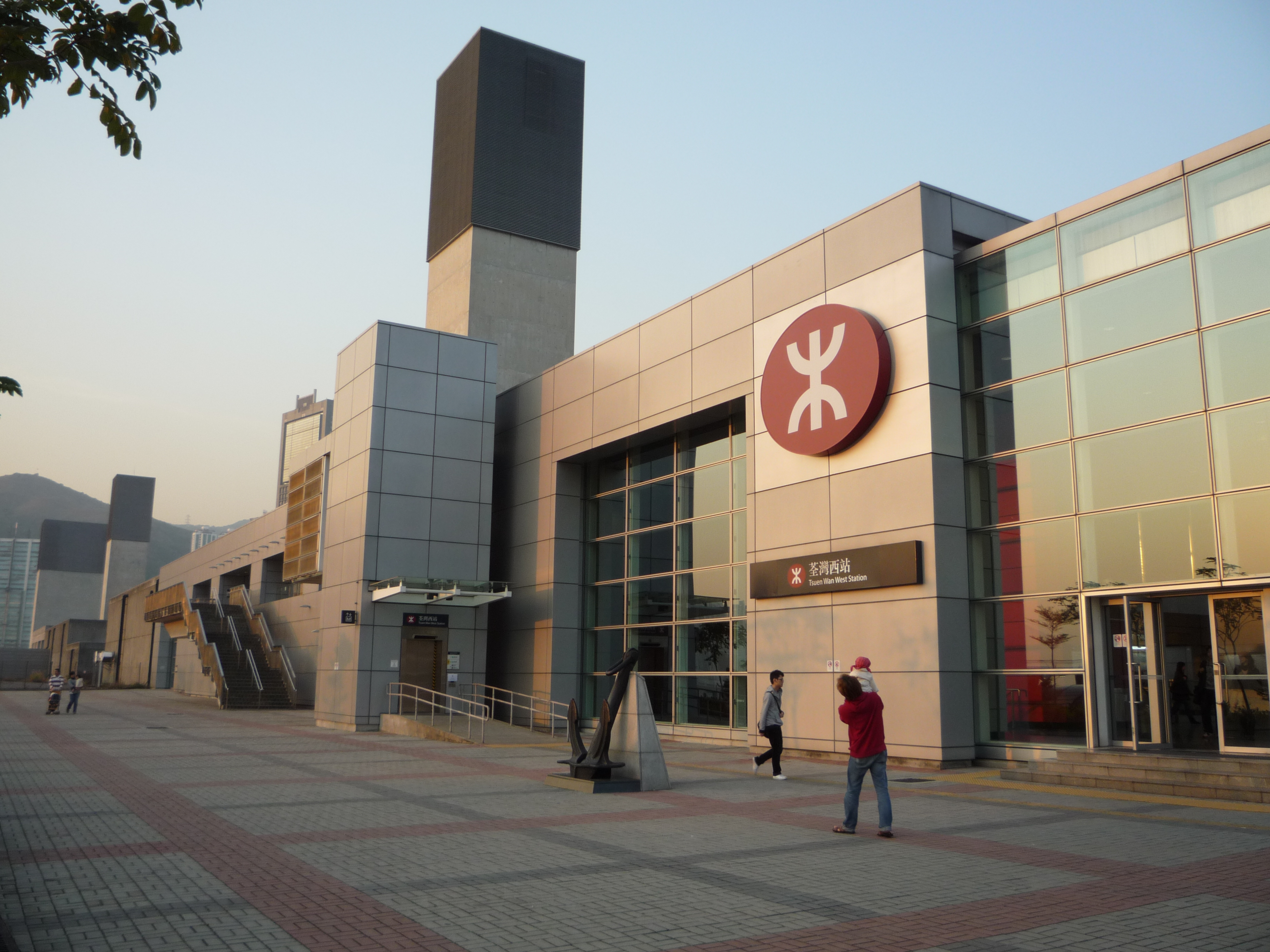
Exit D in January 2010

== See also ==
- Footbridge Network in Tsuen Wan
