= Route 7 (Hong Kong) =

Road in Hong Kong

Route 7

- Alignment and exits of Route 7 (zoom in to view exit details)

Route information
- Maintained by Highways Department
- Length: 17.6 km (10.9 mi)
- Existed: 24 June 1961 (Lung Cheung Road)–present

Major junctions
- East end: Wan Po Road, Tseung Kwan O
- Kwun Tong Bypass; Kai Fuk Road, Ngau Tau Kok; Lion Rock Tunnel, Beacon Hill; Tsing Sha Highway in Lai Chi Kok; Tsing Kwai Highway, Kwai Chung
- West end: Kwai Chung Road, Kwai Chung

Location
- Country: China
- Special administrative region: Hong Kong
- Districts: Sai Kung, Kwun Tong, Wong Tai Sin, Sham Shui Po, Kwai Tsing

Highway system
- Transport in Hong Kong; Routes; Roads and Streets
← Route 6	→ Route 8

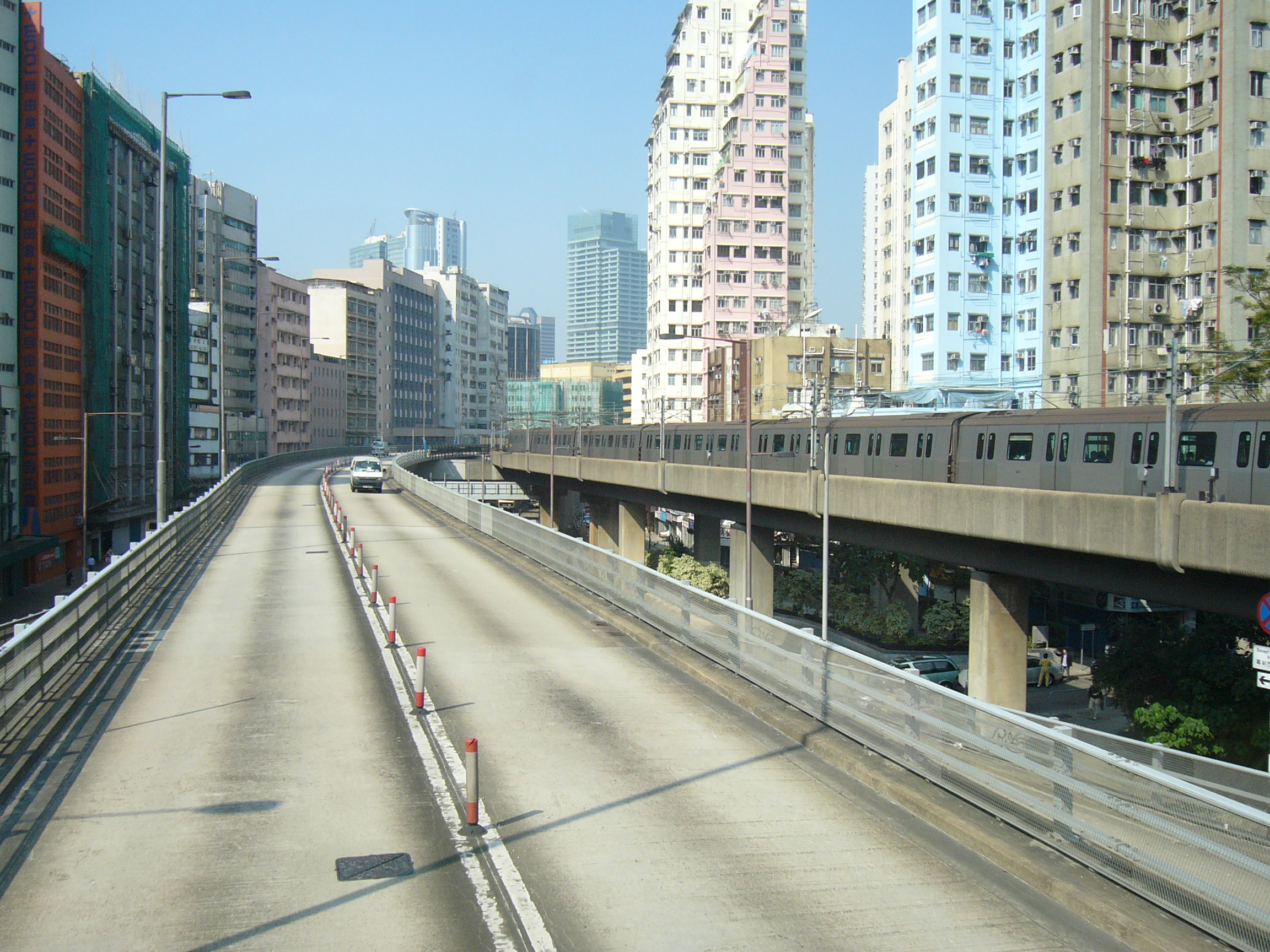
Route 7 near Ting Fu Street, Ngau Tau Kok

Route 7 (Chinese: 七號幹線; Jyutping: cat1 hou6 gon3 sin3) is a major road linking Tseung Kwan O and Kwai Chung, through the northern part of Kowloon in Hong Kong.

The route was constructed in the 1960s, and consisted of sections of Lung Cheung Road and Ching Cheung Road. It was built as a five lane dual carriageway to connect the factories in Kwun Tong with the Container Terminals, bypassing the built-up areas in Kowloon. The route was previously known as Route 4 and has been renamed in 2004. Following the opening of the Tseung Kwan O Tunnel in 1990, Route 7 was extended to Tseung Kwan O. Route 7 is also the only route without Expressway.

== Route description ==
Route 7 begins at Wan Po Road in Tseung Kwan O and travels west to Kwun Tong via the Tseung Kwan O Tunnel. It follows Sau Mau Ping Road and meets Route 2 at Kwun Tong Bypass, then branches off into Kwun Tong Road. The road becomes a viaduct until it descends onto the ground level and joining Prince Edward Road East. The viaduct continues as Route 5 along the shore.

After Kowloon Bay, the road makes a few sharp bends before entering Lung Cheung Road. The route continues heading west and passes through the suburbs of Diamond Hill, Wong Tai Sin and Wang Tau Hom. The road becomes considerably steeper near the exit for Lion Rock Tunnel, and follows the foothills of northern Kowloon. At Tai Wo Ping, the route interchanges with Tai Po Road and continues as Ching Cheung Road, bypassing Sham Shui Po and Cheung Sha Wan before terminating at Kwai Chung and joins Route 5 again.

Some sections of the route are otherwise known as:

- Ching Cheung Road
- Lung Cheung Road
- Kwun Tong Road
- Tseung Kwan O Road
- Tseung Kwan O Tunnel and Tseung Kwan O Tunnel Road

== Exits and Interchanges ==
District	Location	Road Name	km	mi	Exit	Kwai Chung (West) bound destination	Tseung Kwan O (East) bound destination	Notes
Sai Kung District	Pak Shing Kok	Joins Wan Po Road (Non-route part)						
Sai Kung District	Hang Hau	Wan Po Road	—	—	1		Po Yap Road, Chiu Shun Road – Sai Kung, Town Centre	
Sai Kung District	Hang Hau	Wan Po Road	—	—	2	Po Shun Road – Town Centre (Sheung Tak), Tiu Keng Leng		
Sai Kung District	Hang Hau	Wan Po Road	—	—	2		Po Shun Road – Town Centre, Tiu Keng Leng, Haven of Hope Hospital, Kowloon, Hong Kong (East) (Via Route 6 (Tseung Kwan O-Lam Tin Tunnel)	
Sai Kung District	Po Lam	Tseung Kwan O Tunnel Road	—	—	2A		Po Shun Road – Hang Hau, Po Lam, Sai Kung, Tseung Kwan O Hospital, Tseung Kwan O Sports Centre	
Sai Kung District	Ma Yau Tong	Tseung Kwan O Tunnel Road	—	—	Tseung Kwan O Tunnel			
Kwun Tong District	Sau Mau Ping	Tseung Kwan O Road	—	—	3A		Sau Mau Ping Road – Sau Mau Ping	
Kwun Tong District	Sau Mau Ping	Tseung Kwan O Road	—	—	3A		Lin Tak Road – Lam Tin	
Kwun Tong District	Lam Tin	Tseung Kwan O Road	—	—	3B	Kai Tin Road		
Kwun Tong District	Lam Tin	Tseung Kwan O Road	—	—	4	Route 2 (Lei Yue Mun Road) – Lei Yue Mun, Hong Kong (East)		
Kwun Tong District	Lam Tin	Tseung Kwan O Road	—	—	4	Route 2 (Lei Yue Mun Road) – Lei Yue Mun, Hong Kong (East)		
Kwun Tong District	Lam Tin	Tseung Kwan O Road	—	—	4A	Route 2 (Kwun Tong Bypass) – Kowloon Bay, Sha Tin		
Kwun Tong District	Kwun Tong	Kwun Tong Road	—	—	4B		Wai Fat Road – Cha Kwo Ling, Kowloon Bay	
Kwun Tong District	Kwun Tong	Kwun Tong Road	—	—	N/A	Tsui Ping Road		
Kwun Tong District	Kwun Tong	Kwun Tong Road	—	—	5	Hoi Yuen Road, Hip Wo Street – Sau Mau Ping, Kwun Tong Business Area		Westbound
Kwun Tong District	Kwun Tong	Kwun Tong Road	—	—	5	Hoi Yuen Road, Hip Wo Street – Sau Mau Ping, Kwun Tong Business Area		Eastbound
Kwun Tong District	Kwun Tong	Kwun Tong Road	—	—	5A		Hong Ning Road	
Kwun Tong District	Kwun Tong	Kwun Tong Road	—	—	N/A	Hau Ming Street		
Kwun Tong District	Kwun Tong	Kwun Tong Road	—	—	5C	Lai Yip Street – Kowloon Bay		
Kwun Tong District	Kwun Tong	Kwun Tong Road	—	—	5D	Route 5 (Kai Fuk Road) – To Kwa Wan, Hong Kong		Beginning of Route 5
Kwun Tong District	Ngau Tau Kok	Kwun Tong Road	—	—	6A		Nga Lai Road, Lai Yip Street – Ngau Tau Kok, Kowloon Bay	
Kwun Tong District	Ngau Tau Kok	Kwun Tong Road	—	—	6B		Ting Fu Street	
Kwun Tong District	Ngau Tau Kok	Kwun Tong Road	—	—	6C	Hong Tak Road – Telford Garden		
Kwun Tong District	Ngau Tau Kok	Kwun Tong Road	—	—	6D		Ngau Tau Kok Road	
Kwun Tong District	Ngau Tau Kok	Kwun Tong Road	—	—	6E		Fuk To Street	
Kwun Tong District	Ngau Tau Kok	Kwun Tong Road	—	—	6F		Ngau Tau Kok Road – Ngau Tau Kok	
Kwun Tong District	Ngau Tau Kok	Kwun Tong Road	—	—	6G		Choi Wan Road – Sau Mau Ping, Jordan Valley	
Kwun Tong District	Ngau Tau Kok	Kwun Tong Road	—	—	7A	Prince Edward Road East – Kowloon City, Mong Kok		
Kwun Tong District	Ngau Tau Kok	Kwun Tong Road	—	—	7B		Wai Yip Street, Kai Cheung Road – Kowloon Bay, Cruise Terminal	
Wong Tai Sin District	Ngau Chi Wan	Kwun Tong Road	—	—	8	Prince Edward Road East – Mong Kok; Clear Water Bay Road – Sai Kung		
Wong Tai Sin District	Ngau Chi Wan	Lung Cheung Road	—	—	8		Clear Water Bay Road – Clear Water Bay, Sai Kung	
Wong Tai Sin District	Ngau Chi Wan	Lung Cheung Road	—	—	9	Choi Hung Road – San Po Kong, Tsz Wan Shan; Route 2 (Tate's Cairn Tunnel) – Sha Tin		
Wong Tai Sin District	Tai Hom	Lung Cheung Road	—	—	9		Lung Poon Street – Diamond Hill; Route 2 (Tate's Cairn Tunnel) – Sha Tin	
Wong Tai Sin District	Tai Hom	Lung Cheung Road	—	—	10	Po Kong Village Road (Southbound) – San Po Kong, Tsz Wan Shan, Chuk Yuen		
Wong Tai Sin District	Tai Hom	Lung Cheung Road	—	—	10		Po Kong Village Road (Southbound) – San Po Kong	
Wong Tai Sin District	Wong Tai Sin	Lung Cheung Road	—	—	10A		Po Kong Village Road (Northbound) – Tsz Wan Shan	
Wong Tai Sin District	Wong Tai Sin	Lung Cheung Road	—	—	10B	Ching Tak Street – Wong Tai Sin		
Wong Tai Sin District	Wong Tai Sin	Lung Cheung Road	—	—	11	Fung Mo Street – Wang Tau Hom, Kowloon City		
Wong Tai Sin District	Wang Tau Hom	Lung Cheung Road	—	—	11		Fung Mo Street, Ma Chai Hang Road – Chuk Yuen, Wong Tai Sin, Kowloon City	
Wong Tai Sin District	Wang Tau Hom	Lung Cheung Road	—	—	11A	Chuk Yuen Road – Wang Tau Hom, Kowloon City, Hong Kong		
Kowloon City District	Kowloon Tong	Lung Cheung Road	—	—	12	Route 1 (Lion Rock Tunnel) – Sha Tin		
Kowloon City District	Kowloon Tong	Lung Cheung Road	—	—	13	Lung Kui Road – Lung Cheung Road Lookout		
Kowloon City District	Kowloon Tong	Lung Cheung Road	—	—	13		Lung Yan Road – Water Supplies Department Mechanical & Electrical Workshop, Phoenix House	
Sham Shui Po District	Kowloon Tong	Lung Cheung Road	—	—	13A	Tai Po Road – Sham Shui Po, Sha Tin		
Sham Shui Po District	Tai Wo Ping	Lung Cheung Road	—	—	13B	Nam Cheong Street – Shek Kip Mei		
Sham Shui Po District	Tai Wo Ping	Lung Cheung Road	—	—	13B		Lung Kui Road	
Sham Shui Po District	So Uk	Lung Cheung Road	—	—	13C		Tai Po Road – Sham Shui Po, Kowloon Tong, Hong Kong	
Sham Shui Po District	So Uk	Ching Cheung Road	—	—	13D		Tai Po Road – Sha Tin	
Sham Shui Po District	Cheung Sha Wan	Ching Cheung Road	—	—	14A	Wing Tak Road – Caritas Medical Centre		Permission required for access
Sham Shui Po District	Lai Chi Kok	Ching Cheung Road	—	—	14B	Butterfly Valley Road – Lai Chi Kok		
Sham Shui Po District	Lai Chi Kok	Ching Cheung Road	—	—	14C	Castle Peak Road – Kwai Chung – Tsuen Wan		
Sham Shui Po District	Lai Chi Kok	Ching Cheung Road	—	—	14D		Route 8 (Tsing Sha Highway) – Sha Tin, Tai Po	
Sham Shui Po District	Lai Chi Kok	Ching Cheung Road	—	—	14E	Container Port Road South – Container Terminals, Sha Tin; Route 3 (Tsing Kwai Highway) – Lantau Island, Disneyland, Airport		
Kwai Tsing District	Kwai Chung	Joins Route 5 (Kwai Chung Road)						

== See also ==
- Transport in Hong Kong
