= Kwun Tong District =

District in Kowloon, Hong Kong

Kwun Tong 觀塘區
- District
- Kwun Tong District
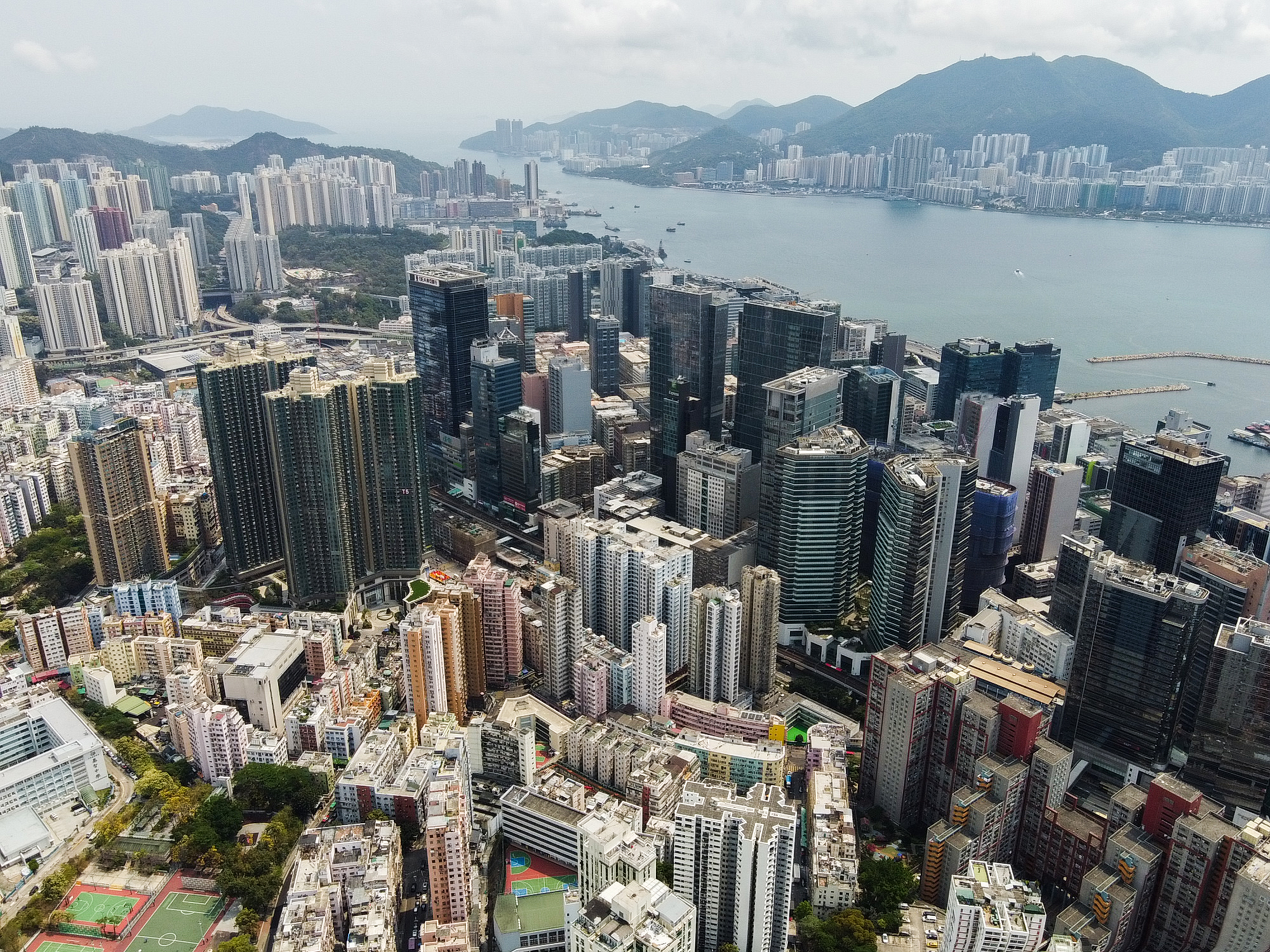
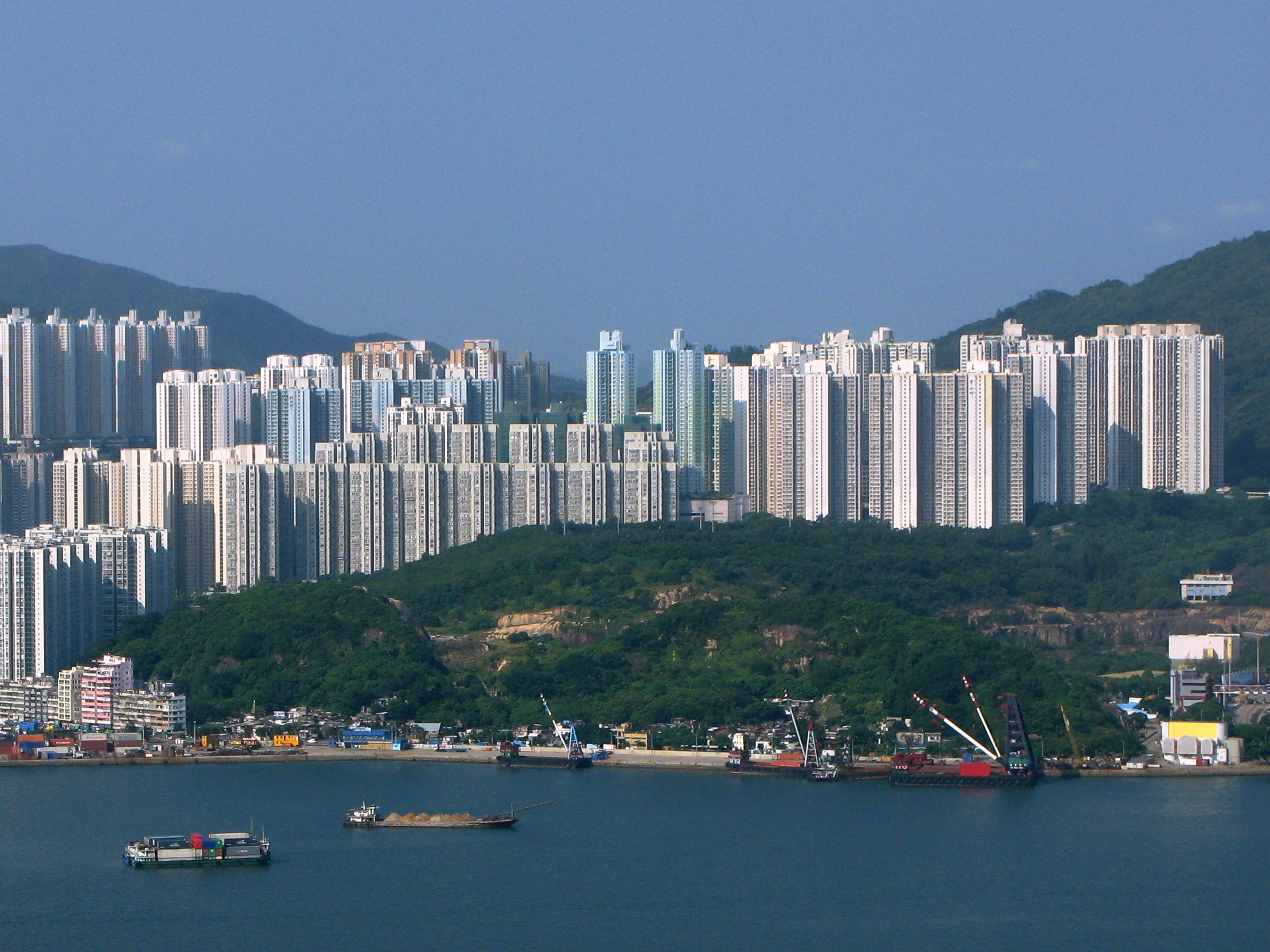
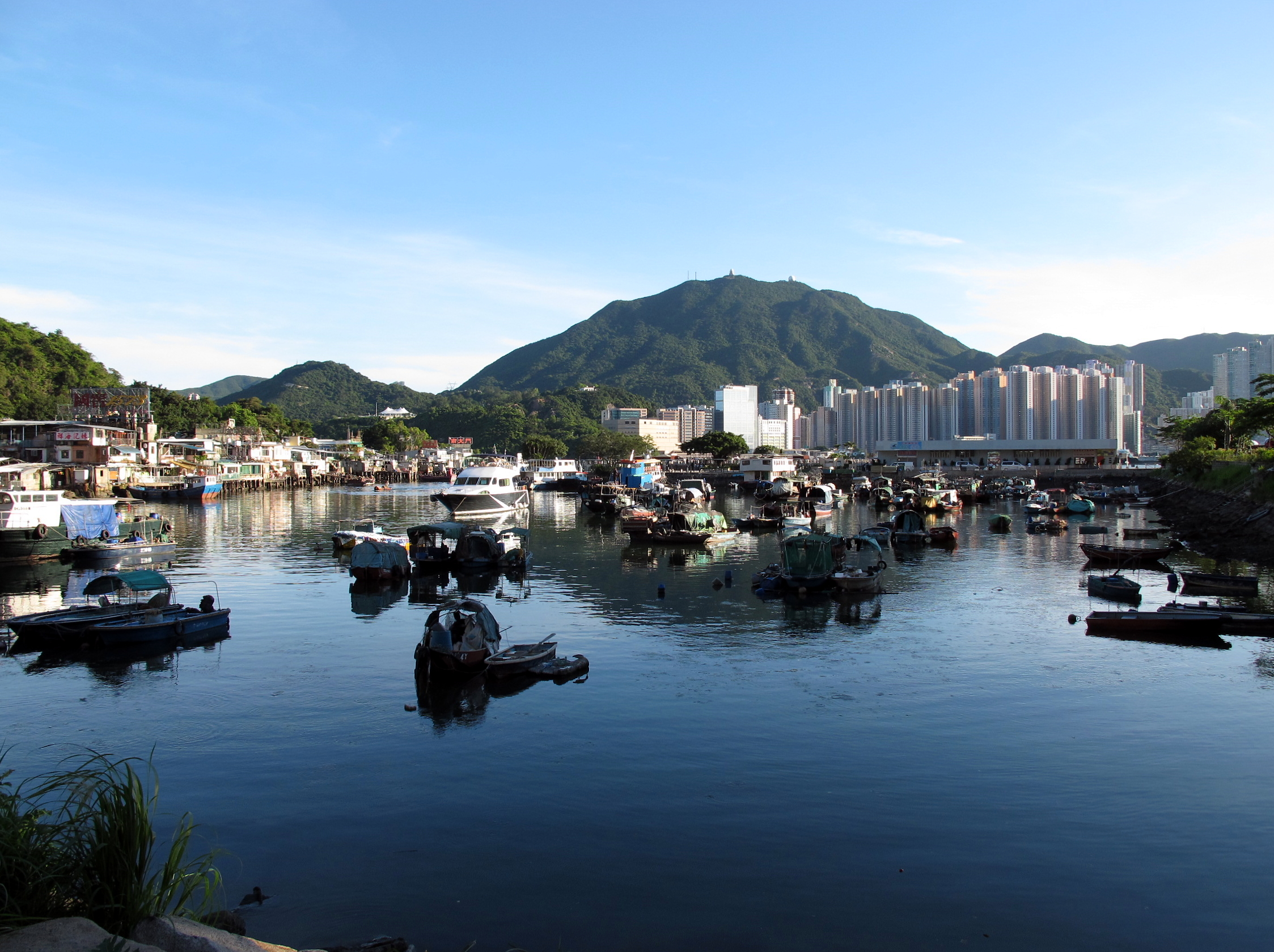
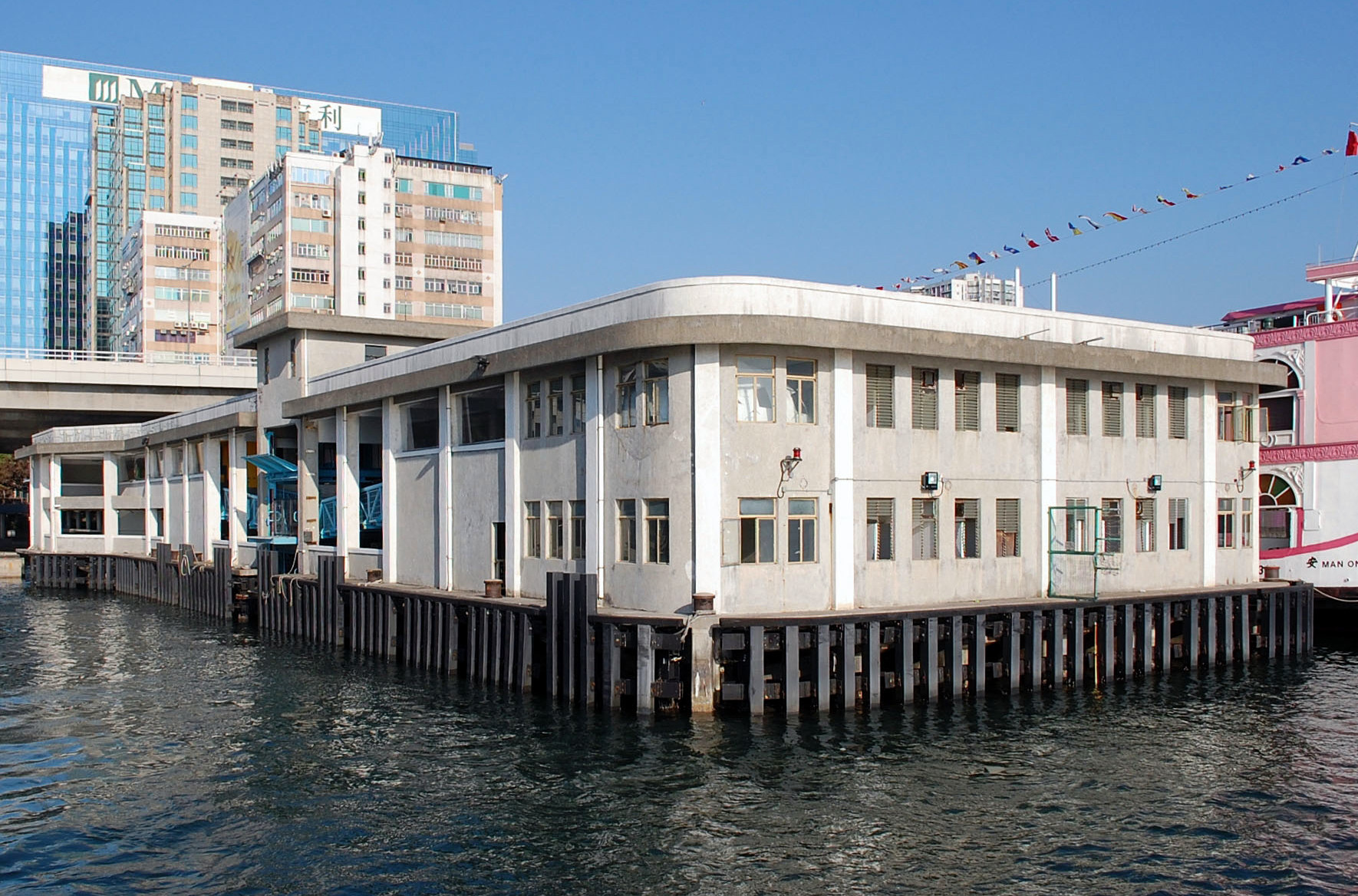
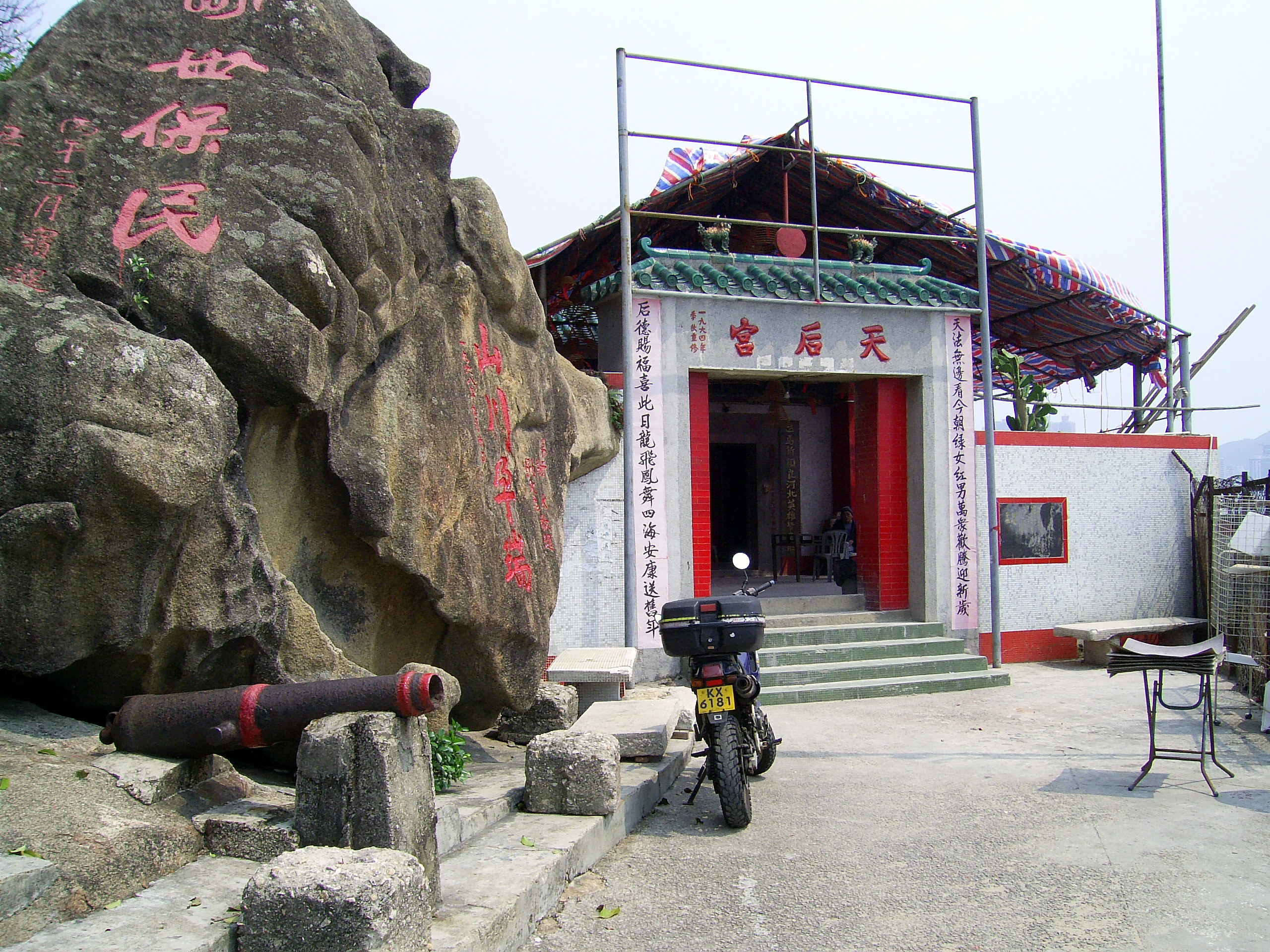
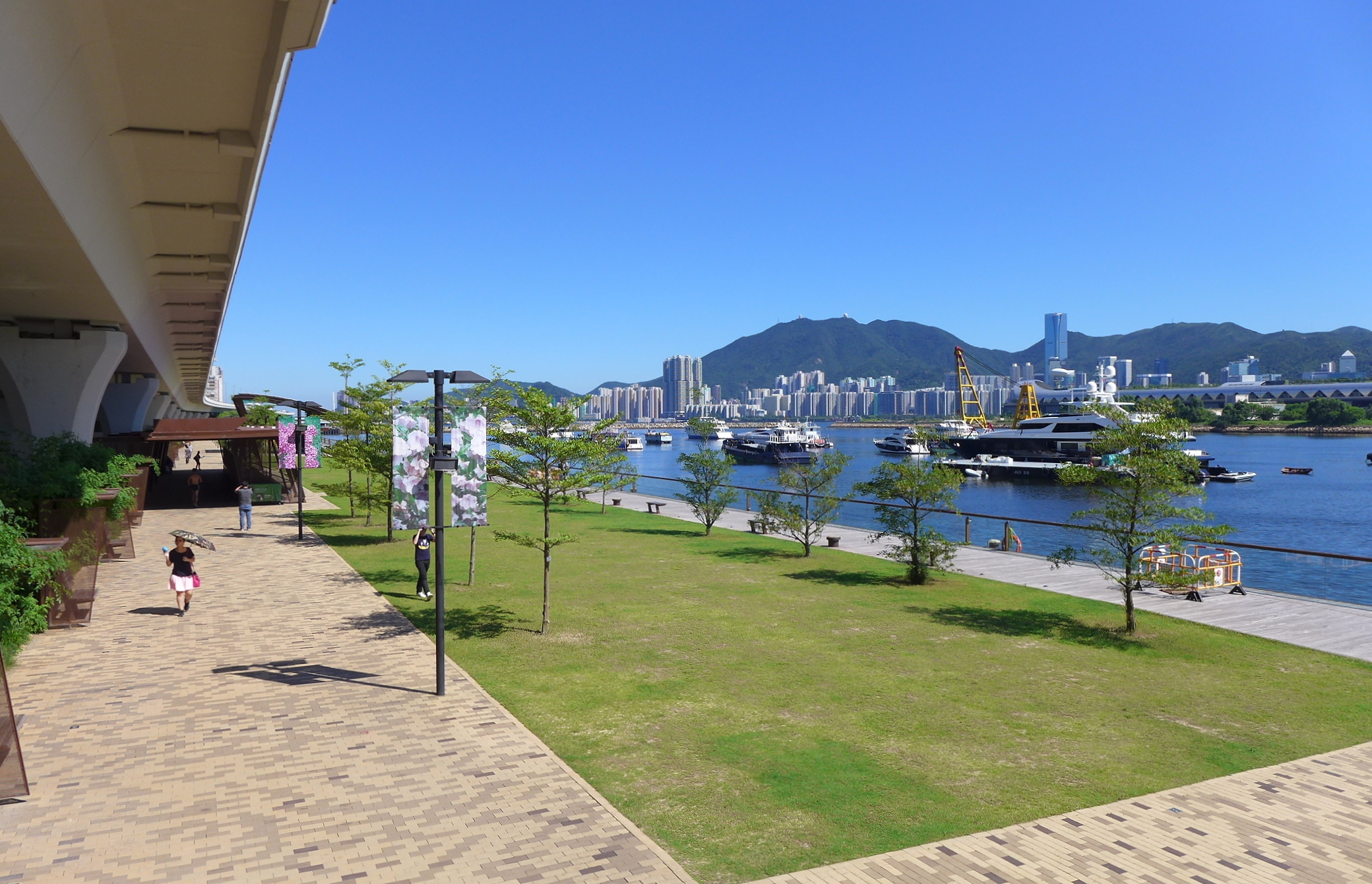
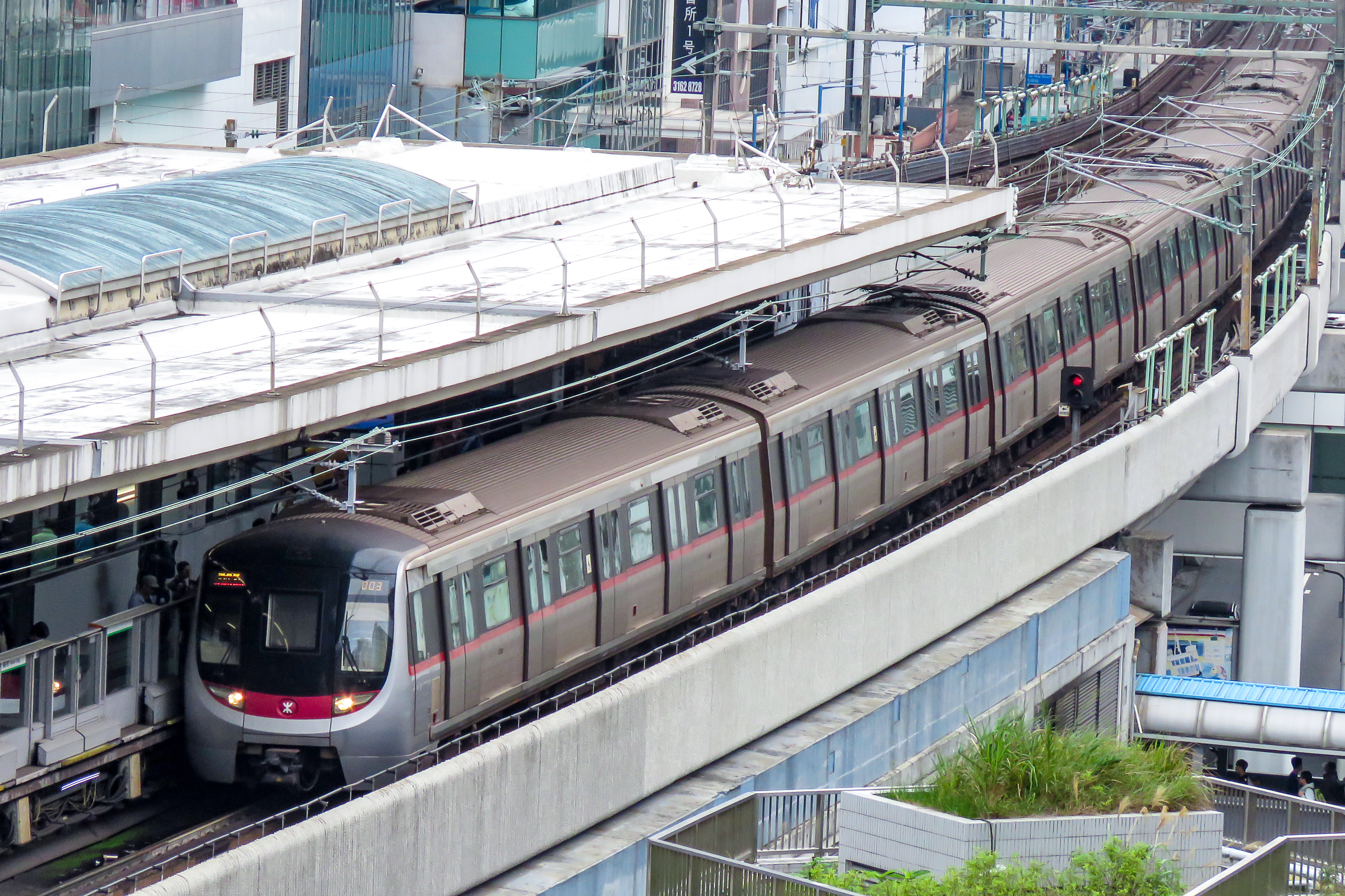
- Kwun Tong skyline and Yau Tong in the distance Lam Tin skyline Sam Ka Tsuen Kwun Tong Ferry Pier Tin Hau Temple Kwun Tong Promenade Kwun Tong station

- Location of Kwun Tong District within Hong Kong
- Interactive map of Kwun Tong
- Coordinates: 22°18′48″N 114°13′33″E
- Statutory-defined area: New Kowloon
- Region: Hong Kong (special administrative region)
- Country: China
- Constituencies: 40

Government
  - District Officer: Andy Lam
  - District Council Chairman: HO Lap Ki, Denny, JP
  - District Council Vice-Chairman: Lui Tung-hai

Area
  - Total: 11.05 km^{2} (4.27 sq mi)

Population (2023)
  - Total: 666,500
  - Density: 60,320/km^{2} (156,200/sq mi)
- Time zone: UTC+8 (Hong Kong Time)
- Largest neighbourhood by population: Kwun Tong (161,884 – 2016 est)
- Location of district council and district office: 392 Kwun Tong Road, Kwun Tong
- Website: Kwun Tong District Council

Kwun Tong District
- Traditional Chinese: 觀塘區
- Simplified Chinese: 观塘区
- Cantonese Yale: Gūntòhng kēui
Transcriptions
Standard Mandarin
- Hanyu Pinyin: Guāntáng qū
Wu
- Wugniu: kuoe^{1} daon^{2} chiu^{1}
- IPA: Shanghainese: [kuø˥ dɑ̃˧ tɕʰy˨]
Yue: Cantonese
- Yale Romanization: Gūntòhng kēui
- Jyutping: gun^{1} tong^{4} keoi^{1}
- IPA: [kun˥.tʰɔŋ˩ kʰɵɥ˥]

Kwun Tong District (Chinese: 觀塘區) is one of the 18 districts of Hong Kong. It is located in Kowloon, and is the easternmost and southernmost district in Kowloon. It had a population of 666,500 in 2023. The district has the second highest population in Hong Kong, after Sha Tin District, while the income is below average. Kwun Tong District borders Sai Kung District to the east, Wong Tai Sin District to the north, and Kowloon City District to the west. To the south is Victoria Harbour, and the Eastern District directly across on Hong Kong Island.

It is the most densely populated district in Hong Kong, at 60,000 per km^{2}, but it is also one of the largest industrial areas in Hong Kong. Kwun Tong District is known for its industry, with factories built during the 1950s; they were mainly located in Kowloon Bay, Kwun Tong, and Yau Tong. Since the relocation of the manufacturing industry, Kwun Tong district has seen a rise of commercial buildings, such as APM Millennium City 5. Kwun Tong is served by six stations on the Kwun Tong line: Yau Tong (also on the Tseung Kwan O line), Lam Tin, Kwun Tong, Ngau Tau Kok and Kowloon Bay.

Pollution, poverty and ageing population remain concerns for the district. According to statistical figures, the proportion of poor people in this district is 28.8% in 2020, while the proportion of the elderly population is 23.4% in 2022. Furthermore, the number of poor people living in this district is 191,500, which is the highest in Hong Kong.

== Areas ==
The district consists of the following areas:

- Kwun Tong (觀塘)
- Ngau Tau Kok (牛頭角)
- Kowloon Bay (九龍灣)
- Sau Mau Ping (秀茂坪)
- Lam Tin (藍田)
- Yau Tong (油塘) and Lei Yue Mun (鯉魚門)

== Features ==
=== Industrial area ===
Kwun Tong District was one of the many industrial areas in Hong Kong. The factories had been built since the 1950s. These industrial areas are mainly located in Kowloon Bay, Kwun Tong (to the southwest of Kwun Tong Road), and Yau Tong. The area south of Kwun Tong road was the largest industrial area in Hong Kong during the 1970s to mid 1980s, accounting for one third of all industrial employment at the time. Many textile, manufacturing, food, and electronics industries were based there during this period, such as: Union Button Factory Ltd., Seven-up Beverages Limited, Sanden Electronics Equipment Ltd, Hong Kong Soya Bean Products Co. Ltd (Later Vitasoy).

Since the 1978 economic reforms in Mainland china which established cities such as Zhuhai and Shenzhen as Special Economic Zones, many factories have moved away from Hong Kong into the mainland. Manufacturing in Hong Kong had since sharply declined.

In 2001, Kowloon Bay and Kwun Tong's industrial districts were rezoned for 'business' use, many industrial buildings have been demolished or repurposed as commercial buildings or shopping malls such as APM. While old industrial buildings have become popular to small businesses, artists, musicians, and collectors, who set up their working spaces there due to cheaper rents.

=== APM Millennium City 5 ===
Opened in Hong Kong in April 2005, APM Millennium City 5 is a commercial property developed by Sun Hung Kai Properties. Together with Millennium Cities 1, 2, 3, and 6, they are commercial properties situated along Kwun Tong Road. APM Millennium City 5 is next to the Kwun Tong station. There is also a 7-storey shopping arcade with an array of restaurants, clothing stores, cosmetics shops, and a cineplex. It also contains a bus terminus and parking facilities.

It is the largest mall in the district, and caters for the habits of the community by having extended operating hours. Its name 'APM' implies that visitors are welcome during day (am) and night (pm). In fact, many shops inside the mall are open overnight. Some retail shops close at 12 midnight, and restaurants close at 2am. There are also stores that operate 24 hours.

=== Residential area ===
The residential areas in Kwun Tong are mainly located in Ngau Tau Kok, upper Kwun Tong Central, Sau Mau Ping and Lam Tin. In 2005, Around 61% of the population of the Kwun Tong District live in public housing estates, 16% in the Home Ownership Scheme estates, and 23% in private housing.

With the redevelopment schemes of housing estates being completed successively in recent years such as the Upper Ngau Tau Kok Estate in 2009, many older estates have been replaced by new ones, with most residents being able to relocate to new flats of better condition. Another renewal project, the renewal of Kwun Tong Town Center (KTTC) led by the Urban Renewal Authority, aimed at redevelop many infrastructures including residential buildings and was also largely successful. The project increased the living conditions of many residents while giving a renewed look to the amenities of the district, many residents were satisfied with their relocated places.

Though many have benefited from the residential redevelopments starting from the 2000s, it has also sparked dissatisfaction from many people, who feel that redevelopment broke down social linkages and is destroying people's sense of belonging. The working class and grassroots people were the most hard hit, as they could not afford the new prices and rents of the redeveloped KTTC, leading many to be forced to leave their established communities.

=== Health care ===
The supply and demand of medical and health services in Kwun Tong are all very stringent, and especially the accident and emergency services are provided by the United Christian Hospital which is the only hospital in the District equipped with casualty facilities. In the event of accidents and disasters, the injured have to be sent there for emergency medical treatment. In addition, various health services are provided by the Department of Health in the District, including an elderly health centre, a woman health centre, a chest clinic, a child assessment centre, a dermatological clinic, a dental out-patient clinic, a school dental clinic, a social hygiene clinic, two maternal and child health care centres, two methadone clinics and three student health service centres/special assessment centres.

=== Recreational facilities ===
There are nine community centres under the District Office, and they are distributed over the 8 sub-districts of the Kwun Tong District. The oldest one is the Kwun Tong Community Centre, which is already 34 years old, while the newest one is the Sai Tso Wan Neighbourhood Community Centre. The construction of the centre, which was completed in 1993, is the ancillary requirement that Laguna City developer has to fulfil for property development therein.

== Transport ==
Kwun Tong is served by the Kwun Tong line (six stations) and the Tseung Kwan O line (one station) of the MTR metro system.

Major roads that serves the area include:

- Kwun Tong Road
- Kwun Tong Bypass
- Tseung Kwan O Tunnel
- Eastern Harbour Crossing (EHC)

=== Public transport ===
- MTR
  - Kwun Tong line: Yau Tong, Lam Tin, Kwun Tong, Ngau Tau Kok, Kowloon Bay
  - Tseung Kwan O line: Yau Tong
- (franchised) bus
  - KMB : 1A, 2A, 2X, 3D, 5D, 5M, 5R, 6D, 6E, 6P, 9, 11B, 11C, 11D, 11X, 13D, 13P, 13M, 13X, 14, 14B, 14D, 14H, 14X, 15, 15A, 15X, 16, 16M, 16X, 17, 23, 23M, 24, 26, 26M, 26X, 27, 28, 28B, 28S, 29M, 33, 33B, 38, 38P, 40, 40A, 40P, 42, 42C, 49, 62P, 62X, 69C, 74, 74A, 74B, 74C, 74D, 74E, 74F, 74P, 74X, 80, 80A, 80P, 80X, 83A, 83X, 88, 88X, 89, 89B, 89C, 89D, 89P, 89X, 91, 91M, 91P, 91S, 92, 92R, 93A, 93K, 93P, 95, 95M, 96, 98, 98A, 98B, 98C, 98D, 98E, 98P, 213A, 213B, 213D, 213M, 213S, 214, 214P, 215P, 215X, 216M, 219X, 224X, 234C, 234D, 252X, 258A, 258D, 258P, 258S, 258X, 259D, 259S, 259X, 267X, 268A, 268C, 268P, 269C, 269S, 274X, 277A, 277E, 277P, 277X, 290, 290A, 290E, 290X, 292P, 293S, 296A, 296C, 296D, 296P, 297, 297P, 298X, N3D, N213, N214, N216, N290, N293, T74, T277, X6C, X42C, X42P, X89D
  - Citybus : 22, 22M, 55, 78C, 78P, 78X, 790, 793, 795, 795X, 796P, 796S, 797, A22, A26, A28, A29, E22, E22A, E22C, E22P, E22S, E22X, N26, N29, N796, NA29
  - Harbour-crossing routes : 101/R/X, 107, 108, 111/P, 600, 601/P, 603/A/P/S, 606/A/X, 608/P, 613/A, 619/P/X, 621, 641, 671/X, 690/P, 694, N121, N619, N691
- Minibus / Public Light Bus
  - Green Minibus
    - to-and-fro Kowloon : 15, 16, 16A, 16B, 16S, 22A, 22M, 23, 23B, 23C, 23M, 24, 34M, 34S, 35, 36A, 46, 47, 48, 49, 50, 51M, 54, 54M, 54S, 56, 59, 60, 63, 68, 69, 71A, 71B, 76A, 76B, 83A, 83M,86, 87, 89A, 89B, 89C, 90A, 90B
    - to-and-fro New Territories : 1, 1A, 1S, 10M, 11, 11S, 12, 12A, 13, 17, 19S, 102, 102B, 102S, 103, 104, 110, 110A, 111, 501S
  - Red Minibus
    - There are about 28 routes, some travel throughout the district, while others goes to-and-fro Mong Kok, Castle Peak Road, Jordan Road, Hung Hom etc.
- Ferry : Kwun Tong Pier
  - Fortune Ferry operates a regular service between Kwun Tong and North Point.
  - Coral Sea Ferry operates a regular service between Kwun Tong and Sai Wan Ho.
- only full-day operated routes are listed above.

== Education ==
- List of schools in Kwun Tong District

Hong Kong Public Libraries has six libraries in the district: Lam Tin, Lei Yue Mun, Ngau Tau Kok, Sau Mau Ping, Shui Wo Street, and Shun Lee Estate.

== Administration ==
=== District officer ===
- Mr Andy Lam

=== Chairman of Kwun Tong District Council ===
- Mr. HO Lap Ki, Denny, JP

=== LegCo ===
In the same constituency with Wong Tai Sin District as "Kowloon East", effective from October 2004:

- Mr. Kam-lam Chan (DAB)
- Mr. Kwok-kin Wong (HKFTU)
- Mr. Alan Kah Kit Leong (Civic Party)
- Mr. Fred Wah-Ming Li (Democratic Party)

== Panorama ==
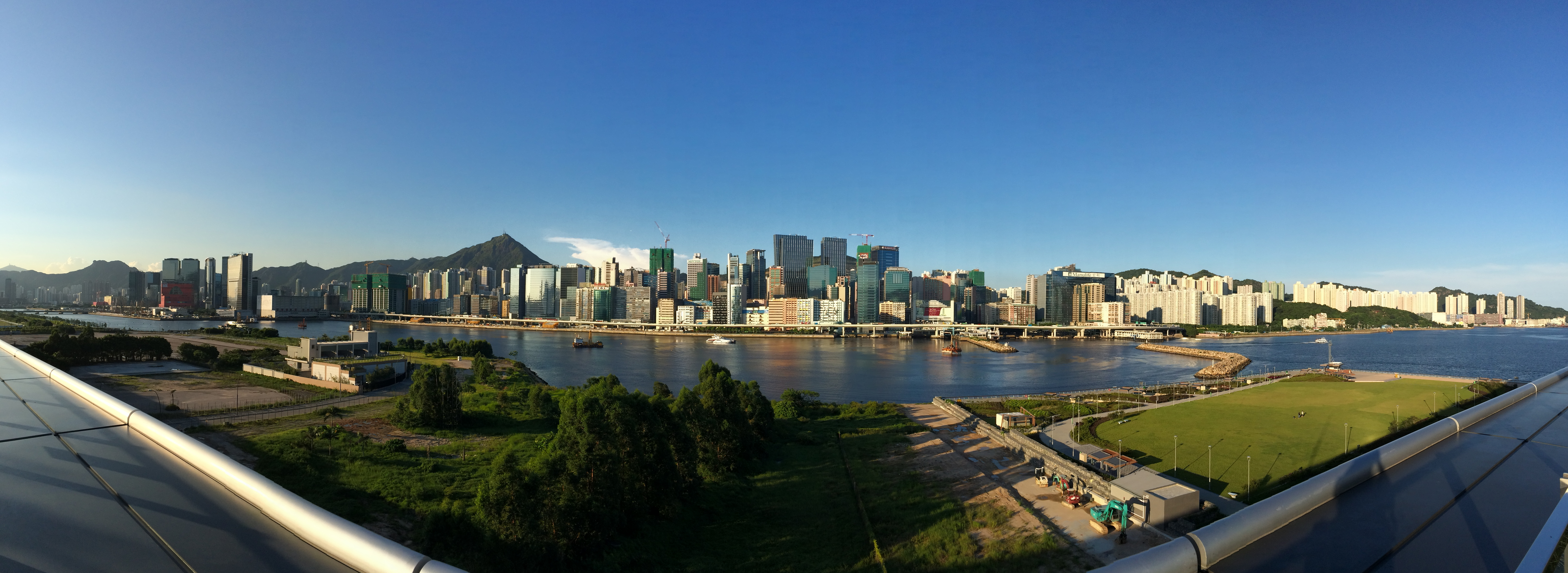
Kwun Tong District 2014

== See also ==
- List of buildings, sites and areas in Hong Kong
