= Kwun Tong Bypass =

Road in Hong Kong

Coordinates: 22.3233°N 114.2154°E

Kwun Tong By-pass
- Part of Route 2
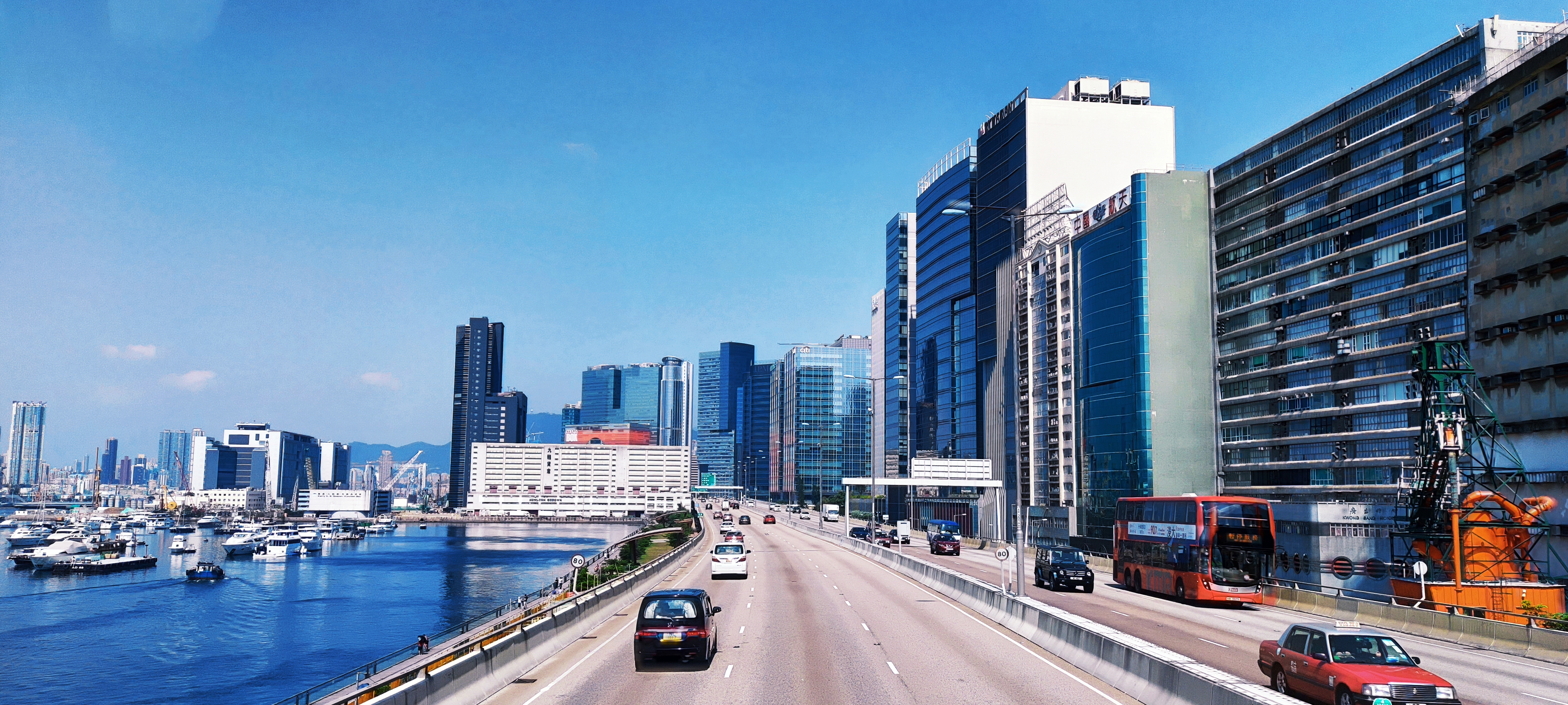
- Three lanes each way near Kwun Tong

Route information
- Maintained by Highways Department
- History: 1989 (Phase I); 1991 (Phases II and III)

Major junctions
- East end: Lei Yue Mun Road, Lam Tin
- West end: Near Rhythm Garden, Prince Edward Road East, San Po Kong

Location
- Country: China
- Special administrative region: Hong Kong
- Districts: Kwun Tong District and Wong Tai Sin District

Highway system
- Transport in Hong Kong; Routes; Roads and Streets

Kwun Tong Bypass
- Traditional Chinese: 觀塘繞道
- Simplified Chinese: 观塘绕道
Transcriptions
Standard Mandarin
- Hanyu Pinyin: Guāntáng Rǎodào
Yue: Cantonese
- Yale Romanization: gun1 tong4 yiu2 dou6

The Kwun Tong Bypass (also spelt Kwun Tong By-pass) is an elevated expressway between Lam Tin and Kowloon Bay in Kwun Tong District, Kowloon East, Hong Kong, with three lanes in each direction and a posted speed limit of 70–80 kilometres per hour (43–50 mph). It is part of Route 2 and has links to Route 5 and Route 7. It bypasses the industrial township of Kwun Tong and passes next to the boundary of the Kai Tak Airport.

Constructed mainly along the seaward frontage of Kwun Tong Business Area, the 5.2-kilometre (3.2 mi) bypass was built to alleviate traffic congestion on Kwun Tong Road of Route 7, to which it is parallel. It bridges Eastern Harbour Crossing (Route 2) and Tseung Kwan O Tunnel (Route 7) at its southeastern end with Tate's Cairn Tunnel (Route 2) and Kai Tak Tunnel (Route 5) at its northwestern end, providing a fast connection across eastern New Kowloon.

== Route description ==
The eastern terminus of the Kwun Tong Bypass is located above the junction of Lei Yue Mun Road and Tseung Kwan O Road, which connect to the Eastern Harbour Crossing and Tseung Kwan O Tunnel, respectively. The point where the bypass nearly meets the Tseung Kwan O Road (immediately south of the Kwun Tong Magistracy) was originally slated to be the site of a cultural centre for Kwun Tong. Instead, the bypass and an electric substation were built on the site and Kwun Tong still has no cultural centre.

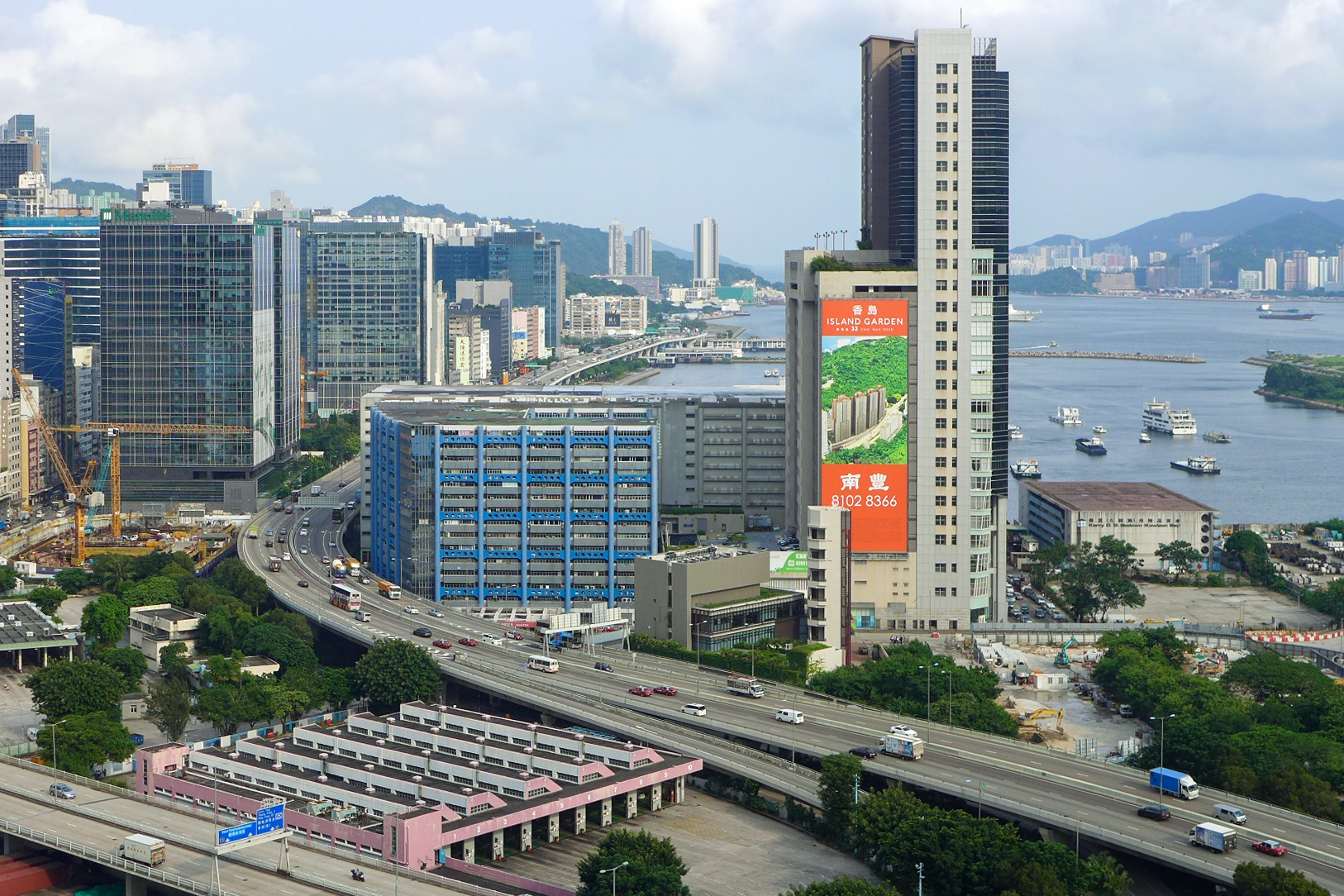
Kwun Tong Bypass near Ngau Tau Kok, as seen from MegaBox in August 2017

The bypass travels southwestward in the form of viaducts above Wai Fat Road (between Kwun Tong Business Area and Laguna City) until the interchange with Wai Yip Street, where it bends northwestwards to run along the waterfront frontage of Kwun Tong Business Area southwest of Hoi Bun Road (lit. seashore road). Formerly a cargo working area, the strip of seaside land beneath the elevated road has been developed into the Kwun Tong Promenade in recent years.

Approaching the entrance of Kai Tak Tunnel at Kowloon Bay, the bypass continues to be elevated atop Kai Fuk Road (part of Route 5. Kai Fuk Road acts as the connection between Kwun Tong Road, Kwun Tong Bypass and Kai Tak Tunnel. Ramps are available near KITEC and MegaBox for vehicles to switch from the elevated Kwun Tong Bypass westbound to Kai Fuk Road westbound on the ground level, and from Kai Fuk Road eastbound to Bypass eastbound, to enter/exit Kai Tak Tunnel.

The bypass viaduct deviates from Kai Fuk Road and turn due north outside KITEC, just east of Kai Tak Tunnel portal. From here the bypass traverses the eastern perimeter of the former Kai Tak Airport apron, which has been redeveloped into public housing (Tak Long Estate) under the Kai Tak Development scheme. The section of viaduct outside Richland Gardens has been enclosed by noise barriers to mitigate the impact of traffic noise to residents there.

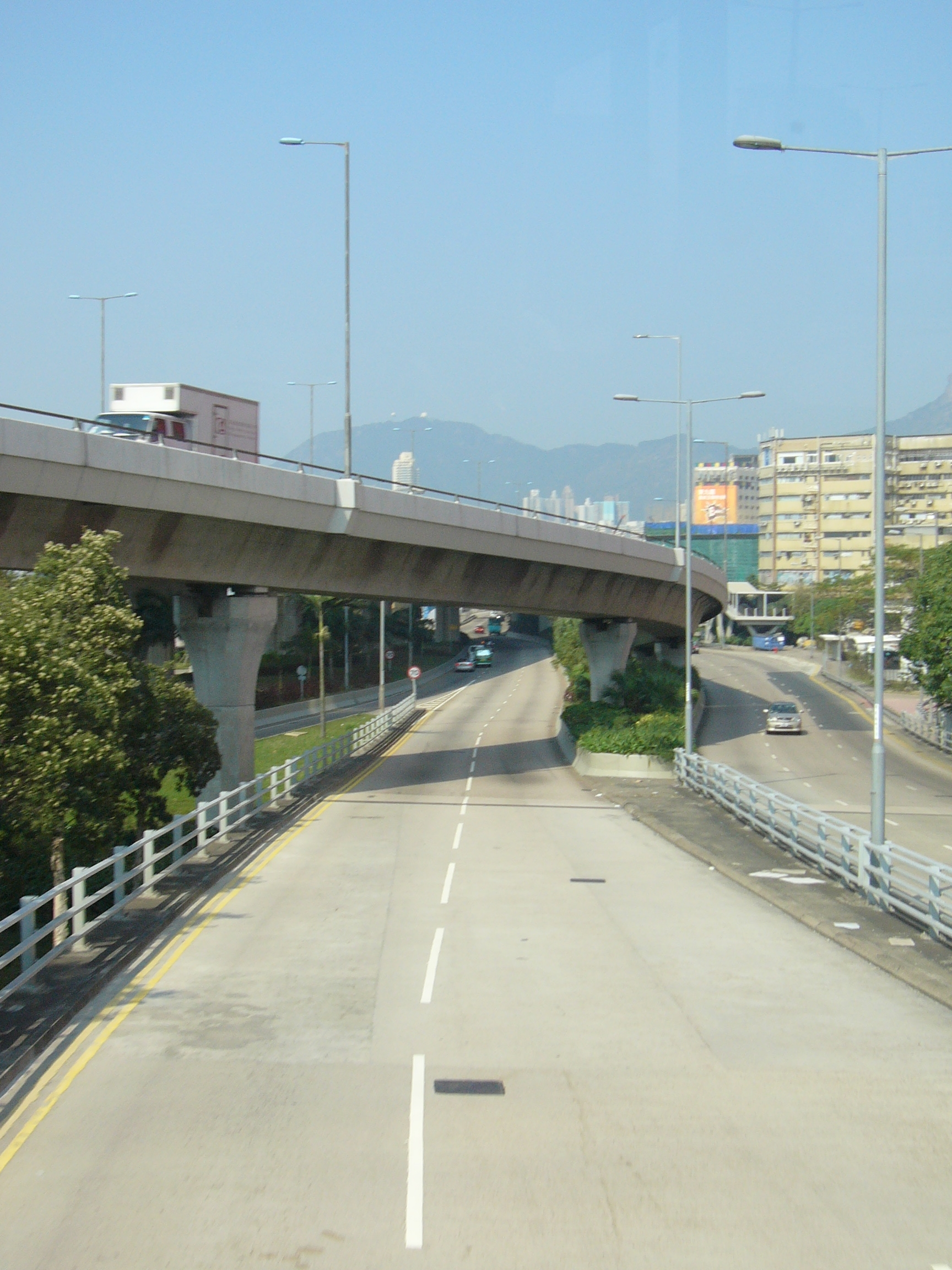
Junction between Route 5 and Kwun Tong Bypass near Kowloon Bay in December 2006

At the northwestern corner of Richland Gardens the bypass continues northwards as the approach road to Tate's Cairn Tunnel. The name "Kwun Tong By-pass" is not officially applied to the section of viaduct between Richland Gardens and Tate's Cairn Tunnel southern portal, which is considered part of Tate's Cairn Tunnel and falls within the jurisdiction of Tate's Cairn Tunnel Ordinance. Nevertheless, many motorists erroneously regard that portion of viaduct as part of Kwun Tong Bypass.

Kwun Tong Bypass in its entirety has been designated an expressway under the Road Traffic Ordinance (Cap. 374, Laws of Hong Kong). Speed limit at the two ends are 70 km/h (43 mph) while the section in the middle (between KITEC and Kwun Tong Ferry Pier) is 80 km/h (50 mph).

== History ==
The road network of the East Kowloon area was at the brink of being overwhelmed at the turn of the 1990s. Within three years three road tunnels, namely Eastern Harbour Crossing (1989), Tseung Kwan O Tunnel (1990) and Tate's Cairn Tunnel (1991) would open, each putting extra pressures to the existing road system of Kwun Tong. According to a government estimate, the traffic volume in the area would see a sixfold rise upon the opening of the three tunnels. It would be unrealistic to route all through traffic to Kwun Tong Road and Wai Yip Street, the two east–west arteries that penetrates through Kwun Tong District.

The idea of constructing an expressway bypassing Kwun Tong town was conceived in 1985 by New Hong Kong Tunnel Company Limited, the build–operate–transfer (BOT) franchisee for the Eastern Harbour Crossing (EHC) project. Such a bypass was not only seen as the antidote to congestion in East Kowloon, but also a solution to the increasing traffic volume generated by the industrial development in Kowloon Bay Industrial Area. The government approved the proposal of constructing Kwun Tong Bypass and works started in August 1987.

Phase 1 of the Kwun Tong Bypass spans from the junction of Lei Yue Mun Road and Tseung Kwan O Road to Wai Yip Street. New Hong Kong Tunnel Company Limited was given the responsibility to undertake its construction on behalf of the government, as it was considered part of the associated works of the EHC project. Construction of this section was completed by Kumagai Gumi in September 1989, when it was opened to traffic together with the Harbour Crossing.

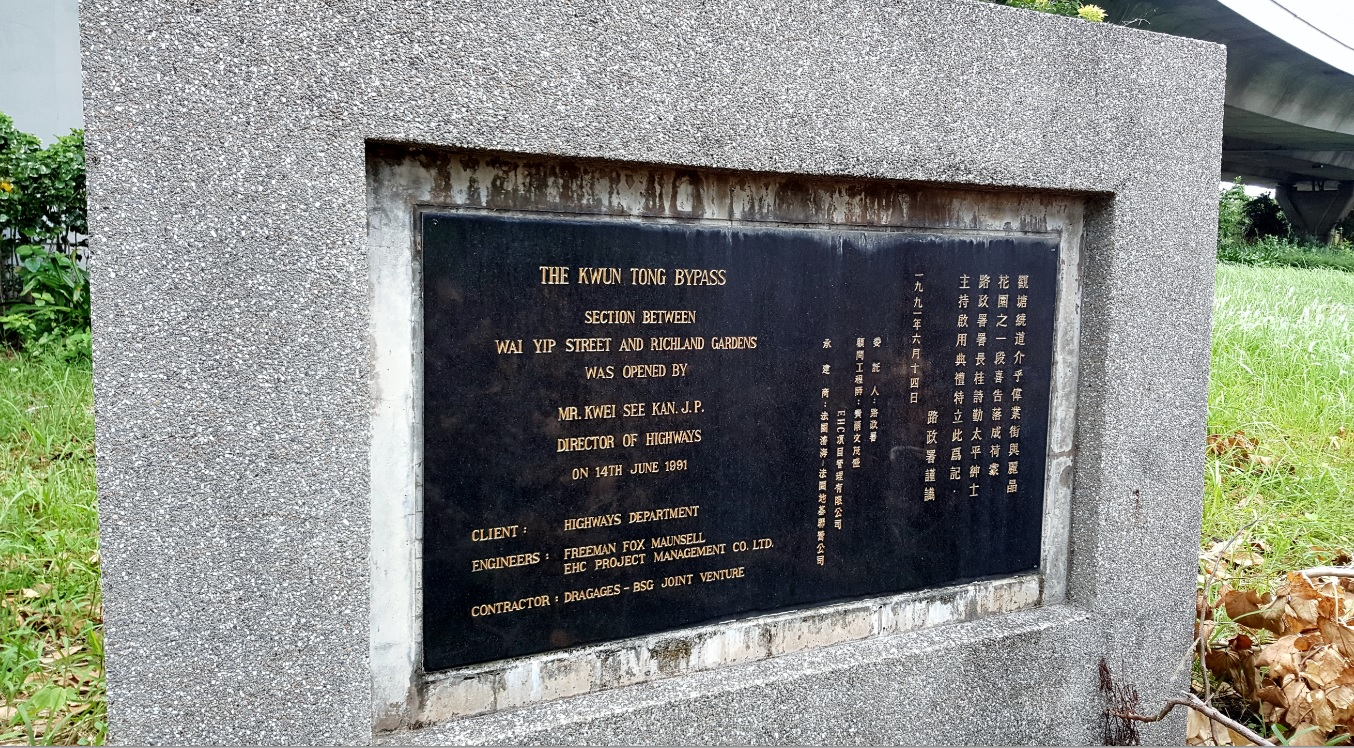
Commemorative plaque for the opening of Kwun Tong Bypass between Wai Yip Street and Richland Gardens in September 2017

The HK$782 million contract—Highways Department's largest engineering contract since its formation—for the construction of Kwun Tong Bypass Phase 2 was awarded to the Dragages–Bachy Soletanche joint venture. Works on this 2.3-kilometre (1.4 mi) section, which connects Wai Yip Street to Kai Fuk Road near the eastern portal of the Airport Tunnel (now renamed Kai Tak Tunnel), began in April 1988. The novel construction method of using precast concrete slabs resulted in the early completion of works by one month. It was opened by Kwei See Kan, the Director of Highways, on 14 June 1991.

The final section of the bypass, which extends northwards from Kai Fuk Road and connects with the approach to Tate's Cairn Tunnel, was commissioned on 26 June 1991 together with the tunnel, 12 days after the opening of Phase 2.

== Interchanges and major intersections ==
The entire Kwun Tong Bypass falls within the boundaries of Kwun Tong District.

Kwun Tong Bypass
Location	km	Exit	Destinations	Notes
Lam Tin	4.4		Lei Yue Mun Road – Lei Yue Mun, Hong Kong (East)	Eastern terminus; Route 2 continues
Lam Tin	4.4	2B	Route 7 (Tseung Kwan O Road) – Tseung Kwan O	Eastbound exit and westbound entrance
Lam Tin	5.0	2C	Wai Yip Street – Kwun Tong Business Area, Cha Kwo Ling	
Kowloon Bay	6.9	2D	Route 5 (Kai Fuk Road) – To Kwa Wan	Westbound exit and eastbound entrance
Kowloon Bay	6.9	2D	Wang Chiu Road – Kowloon Bay & Cruise Terminal	Westbound exit and eastbound entrance
Kowloon Bay	9.0	3	Prince Edward Road East – Mong Kok & Hong Kong	Westbound exit and eastbound entrance
Kowloon Bay	9.0		Tate's Cairn Tunnel – Sha Tin	Western terminus; Route 2 continues
1.000 mi = 1.609 km; 1.000 km = 0.621 mi: Incomplete access; Route transition

Note: Route 2 is considered a north–south artery by the government. Note that "westbound" of Kwun Tong Bypass listed here is equivalent to "northbound" of Route 2; "eastbound" of Kwun Tong Bypass is "southbound" of Route 2.

== See also ==
- Route 2 (Hong Kong)
- Route 7 (Hong Kong)

Preceded by Lei Yue Mun Road	Hong Kong Route 2 Kwun Tong Bypass	Succeeded by Tate's Cairn Tunnel
