= Eastern Harbour Crossing =

Tunnel crossing Victoria Harbour, Hong Kong

Coordinates: 22°17′58.15″N 114°13′51.97″E

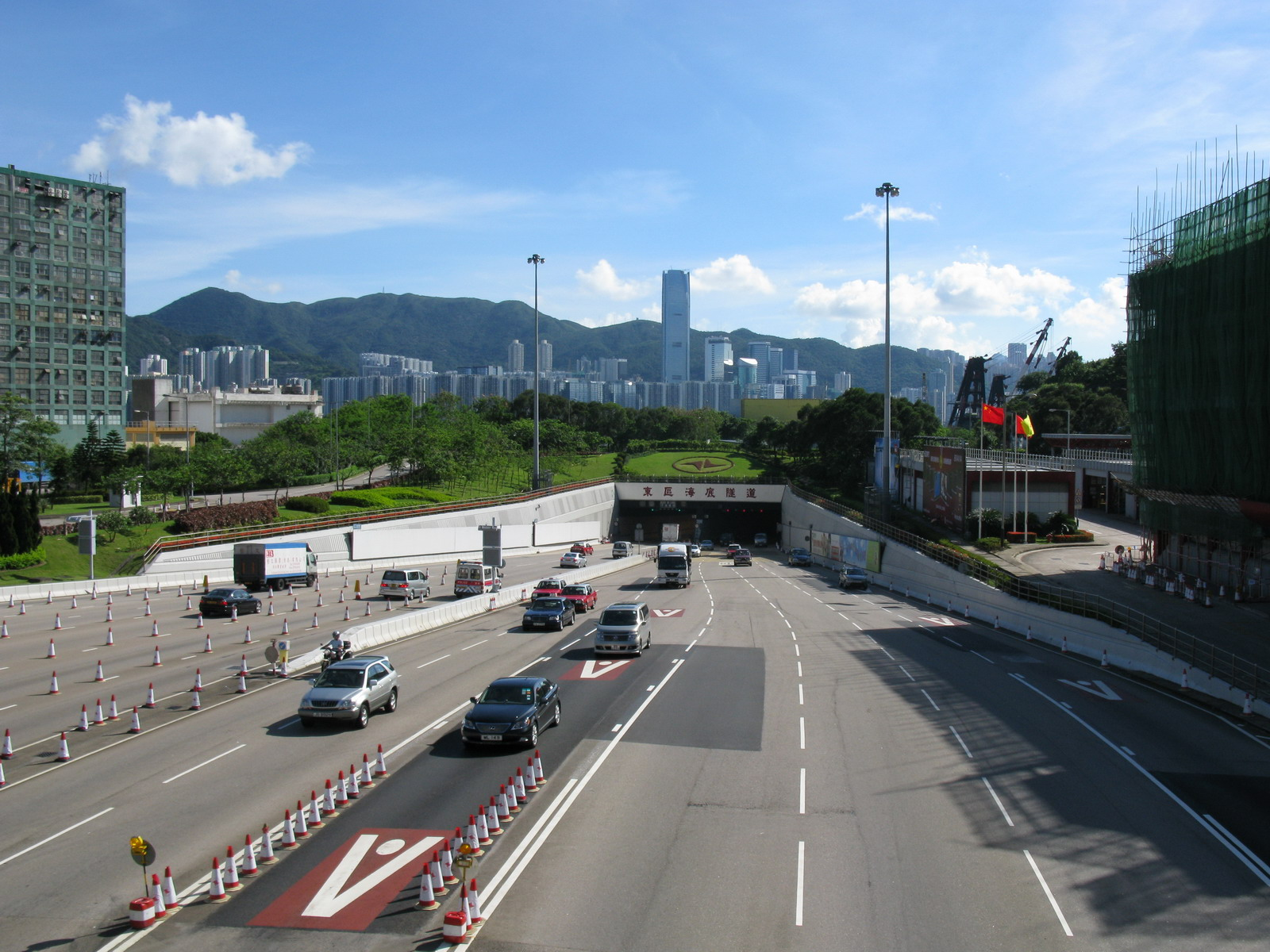
- Entrance to Eastern Harbour Crossing at Cha Kwo Ling in July 2008
- Interactive map of Eastern Harbour Crossing

Overview
- Location: Beneath Victoria Harbour, between Quarry Bay and Lam Tin (near Cha Kwo Ling)
- Status: Active
- System: Part of Route 2
- Start: Quarry Bay
- End: Lam Tin (near Cha Kwo Ling)

Operation
- Opened: 21 September 1989; 37 years ago
- Owner: Hong Kong Government (Road Tunnel); MTR Corporation (Superficies and Track Tunnel)
- Operator: Pacific Infrastructure Limited
- Traffic: Vehicular and Rail
- Character: immersed tube
- Vehicles per day: 71471 (2022)

Technical
- Line length: 2.29 kilometres (1.42 mi)
- No. of tracks: 2 tracks (1 per direction) in train tunnel
- No. of lanes: 4 lanes (2 lanes per direction) in road tunnel with 6 lanes (3 lanes per direction) on exit
- Track gauge: 1,432 mm (4 ft 8 3/8 in)
- Operating speed: 70 kilometres per hour (43 mph) (within road tunnel); 50 kilometres per hour (31 mph) (exit and entrance to road tunnel)

Eastern Harbour Crossing
- Part of Route 2

Major junctions
- West end: Quarry Bay
- 2 in total; Route 4 at Quarry Bay
- East end: Lam Tin (near Cha Kwo Ling)

Location
- Country: China
- Special administrative region: Hong Kong
- Major cities: Kwun Tong, Quarry Bay

Highway system
- Transport in Hong Kong; Routes; Roads and Streets

Eastern Harbour Crossing
- Traditional Chinese: 東區海底隧道
- Simplified Chinese: 东区海底隧道
Transcriptions
Standard Mandarin
- Hanyu Pinyin: Dōngqū Hǎidǐ Suìdào
Yue: Cantonese
- Yale Romanization: Dūngkēui Hóidái Seuihdouh
- Jyutping: dung1 keoi1 hoi2 dai2 seoi6 dou6

The Eastern Harbour Crossing (Chinese: 東區海底隧道), abbreviated as "EHC" (東隧) is a combined road-rail tunnel that crosses beneath Victoria Harbour in Hong Kong. Opened on 21 September 1989, it is the second harbour-crossing tunnel built and the longest amongst the three. It connects Quarry Bay on Hong Kong Island and Cha Kwo Ling in Kowloon East.

== History ==
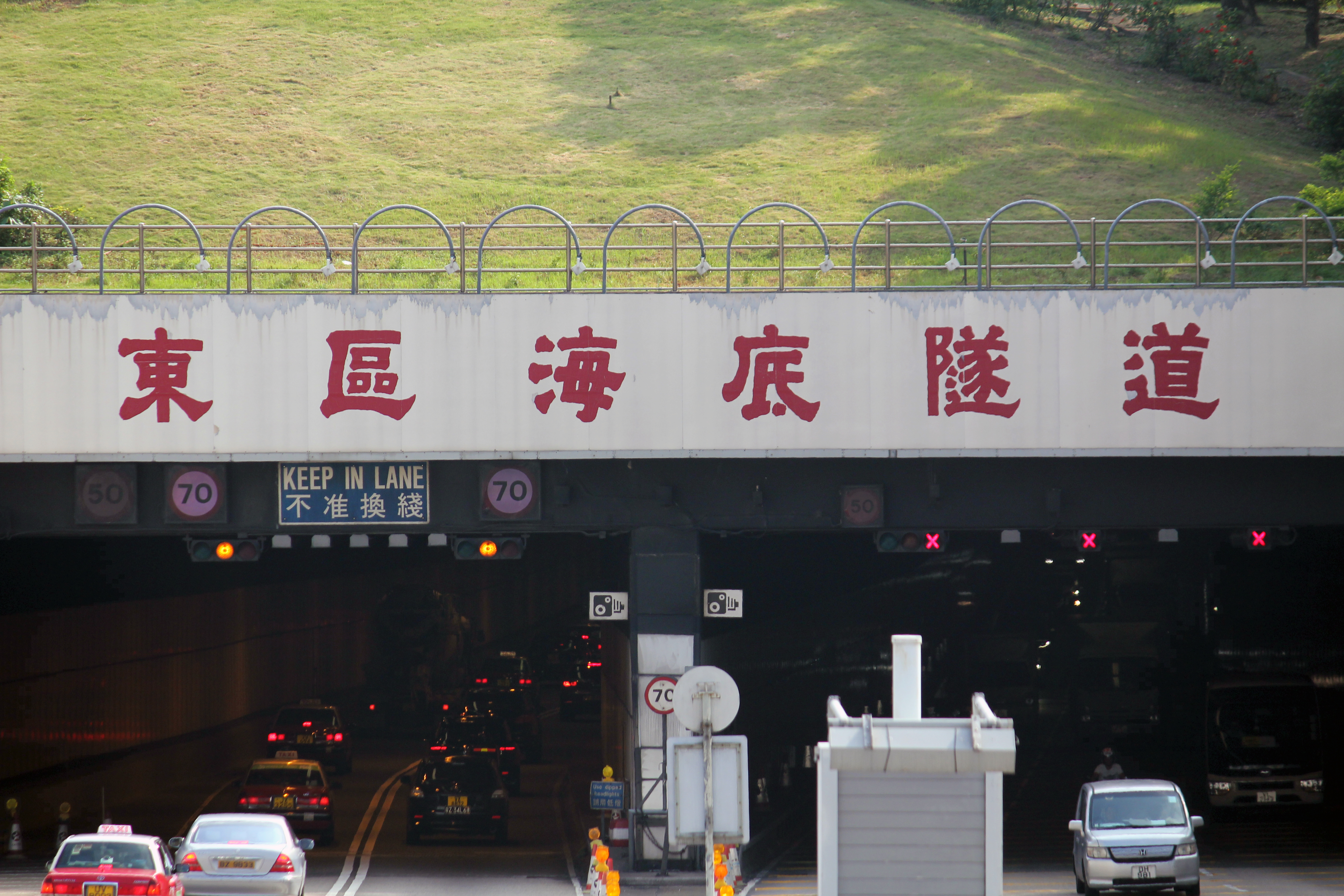
Kowloon Entrance to the Eastern Harbour Crossing

Initially, the Government of Hong Kong had plans to build a bridge across the eastern portion of the harbour but due to fears of the bridge blocking planes landing at Kai Tak airport, this was shelved in favour of a tunnel.

In 1986, the New Hong Kong Tunnel Company Limited won the bidding for this contract, and was given the right to run the road tunnel on a 30-year franchise, and the train tunnel on an 18-years-and-6 months franchisee counting from the first rail operating date. Construction started on 25 September 1986, and was commissioned on 21 September 1989, four months earlier than the original planned finishing date. The first person to cross the tunnel was the then-Governor of Hong Kong Sir David Wilson.

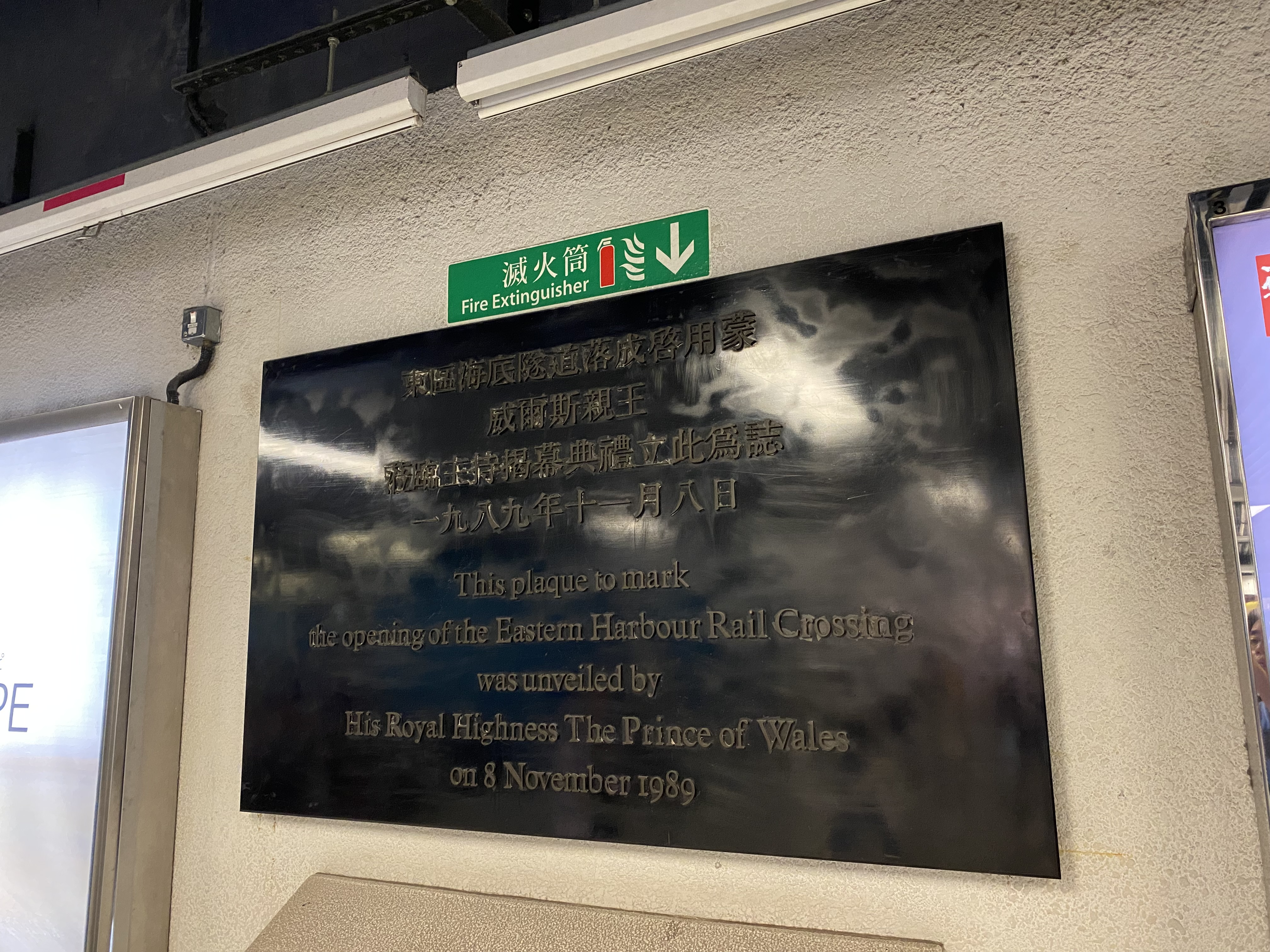
Opening Plaque unveiled by the Prince of Wales Charles in 1989

The tunnel was officially opened by the then Prince of Wales Charles on 8 November of the same year during his and Princess of Wales Diana's Royal Tour to Hong Kong.

In February 2008, the 18-years-and-6 months franchise for the train tunnel expired and was transferred to the government. The government continued leasing the tunnel to the MTR Corporation until 2013, when it was acquired by the MTR Corporation for only HK$1,000, a deal made in the 2000 when the MTR Corporation was undergoing its partial privatisation process.

On 7 August 2016, the 30-year franchisee for the road tunnel expired and the ownership was transferred to the government. The Eastern Harbour Crossing Ordinance was repealed alongside the franchisee's expiry and is instead replaced by the Road Tunnels (Government) Ordinance as the tunnel is now owned by the government. Pacific Infrastructure Limited was granted a new contract to continue operating the tunnel.

On 27 August 2023, the HKeToll was implemented for the Eastern Harbour Crossing. The toll plaza on the Kowloon side was subsequently demolished gradually.

== Tunnel Composition ==
The tunnel consists of two components, the road part and the rail part:

- The road part of the tunnel is branded by the operator as the Eastern Harbour Tunnel, although the government refers to the tunnel itself as the Eastern Harbour Crossing. The tunnel was governed by the Eastern Harbour Crossing Ordinance until 7 August 2016, which it was repealed when the 30-year franchisee expired. It is now instead governed by the Road Tunnels (Government) Ordinance as it is now owned by the government. The road part links the Island Eastern Corridor on Hong Kong Island, Lei Yue Mun Road, Tseung Kwan O Tunnel, Tseung Kwan O——Lam Tin Tunnel and the Kwun Tong Bypass in Kowloon East.
- The rail part, lying to the southeast of the road part, runs between Quarry Bay and Yau Tong stations of the MTR Tseung Kwan O line. It is owned and operated by the MTR Corporation.

== Usage ==
The Eastern Harbour Crossing is the second most-used tunnel in Hong Kong.

Year	Total Traffic	Average Daily Traffic
2022	26,087,021	71,471
2021	28,988,802	79,421
2020	26,376,844	72,068
2019	28,823,264	78,968
2018	28,485,605	78,043
2017	28,173,747	77,188
2016	27,730,541	75,767
2015	27,546,065	75,469
2014	26,657,699	73,035
2013	26,317,796	72,104
2012	25,883,548	70,720
2011	25,374,790	69,520
2010	24,648,289	67,530
2009	22,990,195	62,987
2008	23,137,619	63,218
2007	23,361,921	64,005
2006	22,268,743	61,010
2005	23,310,701	63,865
2004	26,893,049	73,478
2003	26,018,772	71,284
2002	26,789,599	73,396
2001	27,227,360	74,596
2000	26,435,435	72,228
1999	25,116,703	68,813
1998	25,914,641	70,999
1997	31,321,427	85,812
1996	32,256,922	88,134
1995	31,530,828	86,386
1994	31,778,701	87,065
1993	29,192,003	79,978
1992	24,983,737	68,262
1991	17,794,630	48,752
1990	11,733,837	32,147
1989	2,326,493	23,035

== Tunnel tolls ==
Tolls are collected by HKeToll in both directions on both sides.

=== Current tolls ===
Category	Vehicle Type	Tolls
1	Motor cycles and motor tricycles	HK$8–16 (Note: Toll-varying)
2	Private cars	HK$20–40 (Note: Toll-varying)
3	Taxis	HK$25
4	Public and Private light buses	HK$50
5	Light goods vehicles (Note: Including special purpose vehicles of a permitted gross vehicle weight not exceeding 5.5 tonnes)	HK$50
6	Medium goods vehicles (Note: Including special purpose vehicles (other than an articulated vehicle) of a permitted gross vehicle weight exceeding 5.5 tonnes but not exceeding 24 tonnes)	HK$50
7	Heavy goods vehicles (Note: Including special purpose vehicle (other than an articulated vehicle) of a permitted gross vehicle weight exceeding 24 tonnes)	HK$50
8	Public and Private Single-decked buses (Note: Toll fees are exempted for franchaised buses)	HK$50
9	Public and Private Double-decked buses (Note: Toll fees are exempted for franchaised buses)	HK$50
10	Each additional axle in excess of two	Free

=== Historical tolls ===
Category	Vehicle Type		21 September 1989 to 31 December 1997	1 January 1998 to 30 April 2005	1 May 2005 to 16 February 2019	17 February 2019 to 1 August 2023	2 August 2023 to 27 August 2023 (4 am)	27 August 2023 (5 am) to 17 December 2023 (5 am)	From 17 December 2023 (5 am)
1	Motor cycles and motor tricycles		HK$5	HK$8	HK$13				HK$8–16 (Note: Toll-varying)
2	Private cars		HK$10	HK$15	HK$25		HK$30		HK$20–40 (Note: Toll-varying)
3	Taxis		HK$10	HK$15	HK$25 (Note: HK$15 for non-passenger carrying taxis using manual toll)		HK$25		
4	Public and Private light buses		HK$15	HK$23	HK$38				HK$50
5	Light goods vehicles (Note: Including special purpose vehicles of a permitted gross vehicle weight not exceeding 5.5 tonnes)		HK$15	HK$23	HK$38				HK$50
6	Medium goods vehicles (Note: Including special purpose vehicles (other than an articulated vehicle) of a permitted gross vehicle weight exceeding 5.5 tonnes but not exceeding 24 tonnes)		HK$20	HK$30	HK$50				
7	Heavy goods vehicles (Note: Including special purpose vehicle (other than an articulated vehicle) of a permitted gross vehicle weight exceeding 24 tonnes)		HK$30	HK$45	HK$75				HK$50
8	Single-decked buses	Non-franchised	HK$20	HK$30	HK$50	HK$50			
8	Single-decked buses	Franchised	HK$20	HK$30	HK$50	Free			
9	Double-decked buses	Non-franchised	HK$30	HK$45	HK$75	HK$75			HK$50
9	Double-decked buses	Franchised	HK$30	HK$45	HK$75	Free			
10	Each additional axle in excess of two	Franchised buses	HK$10	HK$15	HK$25	Free		Free	
10	Each additional axle in excess of two	Other Vehicles	HK$10	HK$15	HK$25	HK$25		Free	

== Interchanges ==
Eastern Harbour Crossing
Westbound exits	Exit number	Eastbound exits
End of Route 2 intersects with Island Eastern Corridor
End Eastern Harbour Crossing		Start Eastern Harbour Crossing
Tai Koo Shing, Sai Wan Ho, Shau Kei Wan, Chai Wan, Siu Sai Wan, Stanley, Shek O Island Eastern Corridor	1A	no exit
Quarry Bay, North Point, Causeway Bay, Happy Valley, Aberdeen; Island Eastern Corridor	1B	no exit
no exit	1C	Tseung Kwan O, Lam Tin Interchange; Tseung Lam Highway
Eastern Harbour Crossing
Start Eastern Harbour Crossing		End Eastern Harbour Crossing continues as Lei Yue Mun Road

== Transport ==
As of 2018, there are 46 bus routes passing through the tunnel.

== Controversies ==
In June 2005, CITIC decided to raise the toll for using Eastern Harbour Crossing from HK$15 to HK$25 for private vehicles and up to 67% for other classes of vehicles, under the fare adjustment mechanism derived from the build-operate-transfer (BOT) model. This increase aroused criticisms that the model was detrimental to the public interest, with the increase shifting more traffic to the already congested Cross-Harbour Tunnel.

== See also ==
- Vehicular harbour crossings in Hong Kong
- List of tunnels and bridges in Hong Kong
- Megaproject

== Notes ==
Preceded by Southern Terminus	Hong Kong Route 2 Eastern Harbour Crossing	Succeeded by Lei Yue Mun Road
