= Kwun Tong Road =

Road in Hong Kong

Coordinates: 22°19′18.7″N 114°12′52.2″E

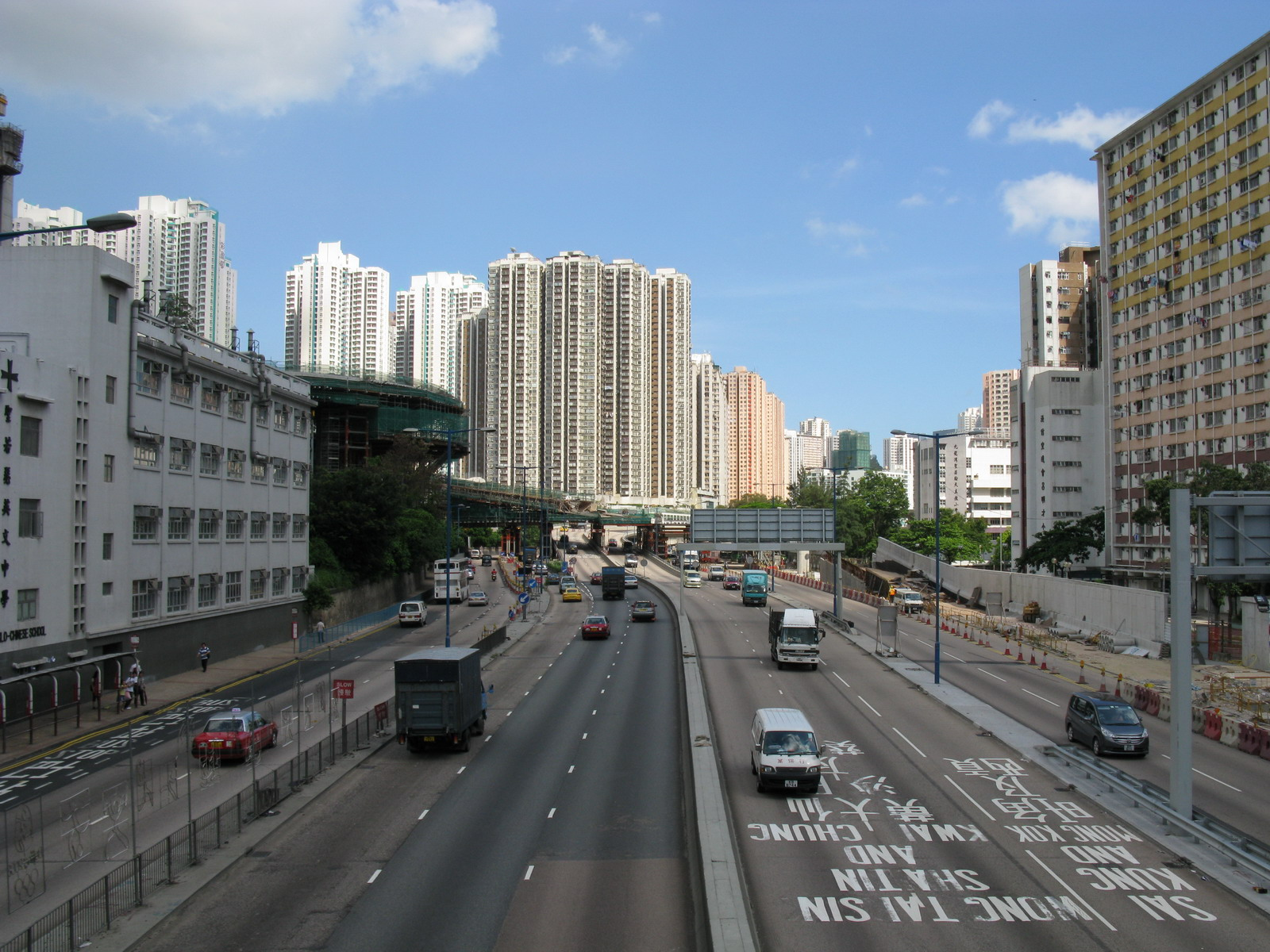
- Kwun Tong Road near Kai Yip Estate
- Interactive map of Kwun Tong Road
- Native name: 觀塘道 (Chinese)
- Part of: Route 7
- Location: New Kowloon, Hong Kong
- From: Clear Water Bay Road, Prince Edward Road East, Lung Cheung Road
- Major junctions: Ngau Tau Kok Road, Hip Wo Street, Hoi Yuen Road, Wai Yip Street, Hong Ning Road
- To: Lei Yue Mun Road, Tsui Ping Road

Kwun Tong Road (Chinese: 觀塘道) is a major thoroughfare in Kwun Tong District, New Kowloon, Hong Kong.

== Location ==
Kwun Tong Road starts at the junction with Prince Edward Road East, Clear Water Bay Road and Lung Cheung Road in Ngau Chi Wan. It runs along the coast of Kwun Tong before reclamation, spans south in Ngau Tau Kok and Kwun Tong, and ends at a junction with Tsui Ping Road, where it is succeeded by Lei Yue Mun Road. Kwun Tong Road is a section of Route 7.

Kwun Tong Road runs through the areas around Kwun Tong Bypass, Kai Yip Estate, the ex-premise of St. Joseph's Anglo-Chinese School, Kowloon Bay station, Lower Ngau Tau Kok Estate, Ting Fu Street, Ngau Tau Kok station, Millennium City, apm Millennium City 5 shopping mall, the roundabout with Hip Wo Street and Hoi Yuen Road beneath Kwun Tong station of MTR, and Bus Terminus.

== History ==
When Kwun Tong station was being built in 1979, a road tunnel known as the Kwun Tong Road Underpass was dug beneath the station to give a bypass for traffic. Having traffic on the main route diverted into the tunnel, the roundabout functions efficiently. Nevertheless, as road transport in the region becomes saturated, the roundabout still occasionally has traffic congestion.

== Features ==
Remaining buildings of the former RAF Kai Tak are located along Kwun Tong Road. With 6 lanes on either side, it is the widest road in urban Hong Kong second widest road in the entire region, only surpassed by Cheung Tsing Highway. A section of Kwun Tong line is elevated along Kwun Tong Road.

== Gallery ==
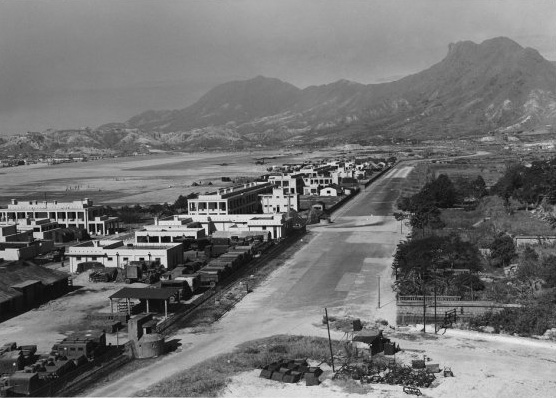
Kwun Tong Road as of 1945 with Lion Rock in the background

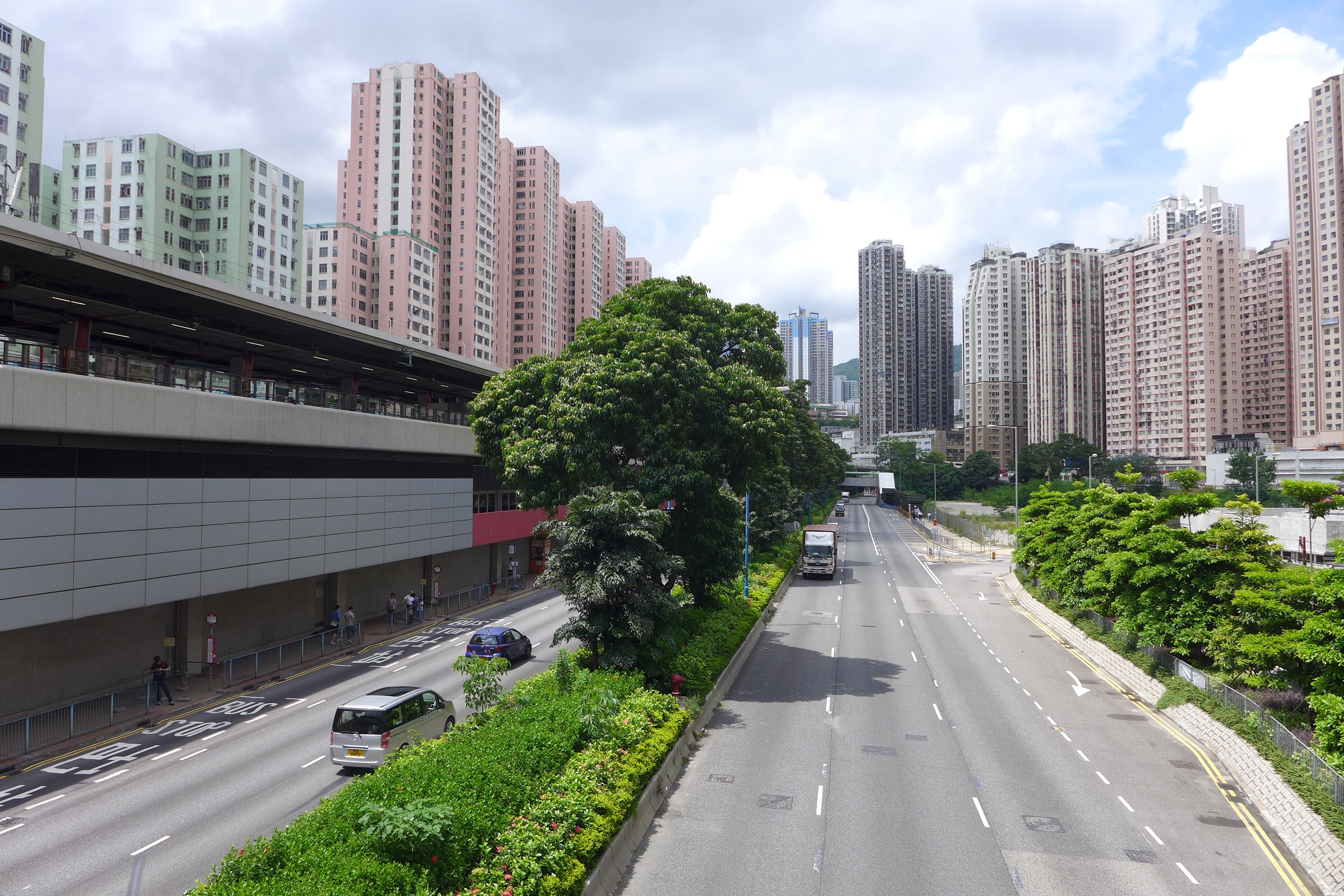
Kwun Tong Road near Kowloon Bay

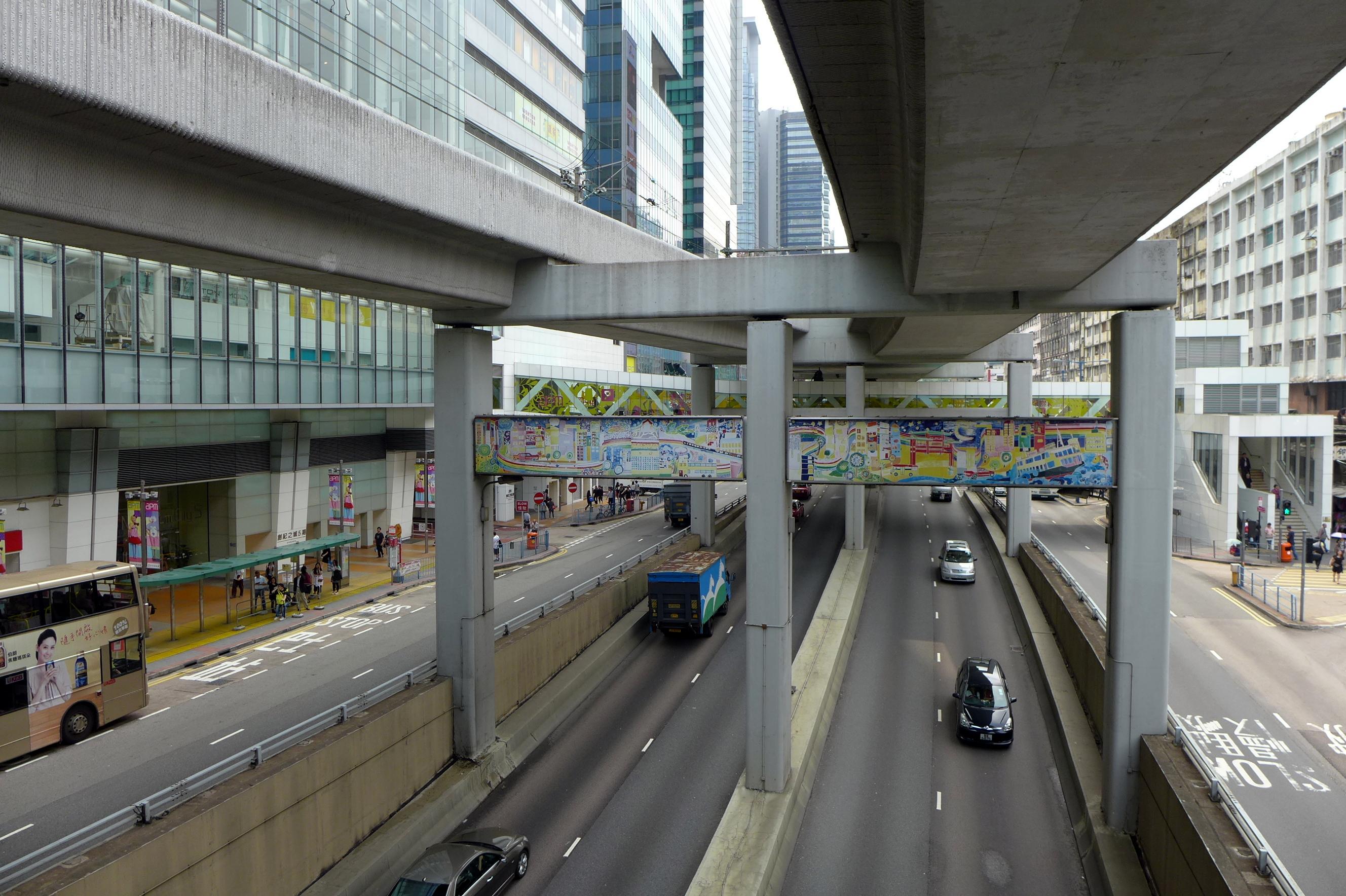
Kwun Tong Road near apm

Preceded by Tseung Kwan O Road	Hong Kong Route 7 Kwun Tong Road	Succeeded by Lung Cheung Road
