= Lung Cheung Road =

Highway in Kowloon, Hong Kong

Coordinates: 22°20′33.3″N 114°11′08.9″E

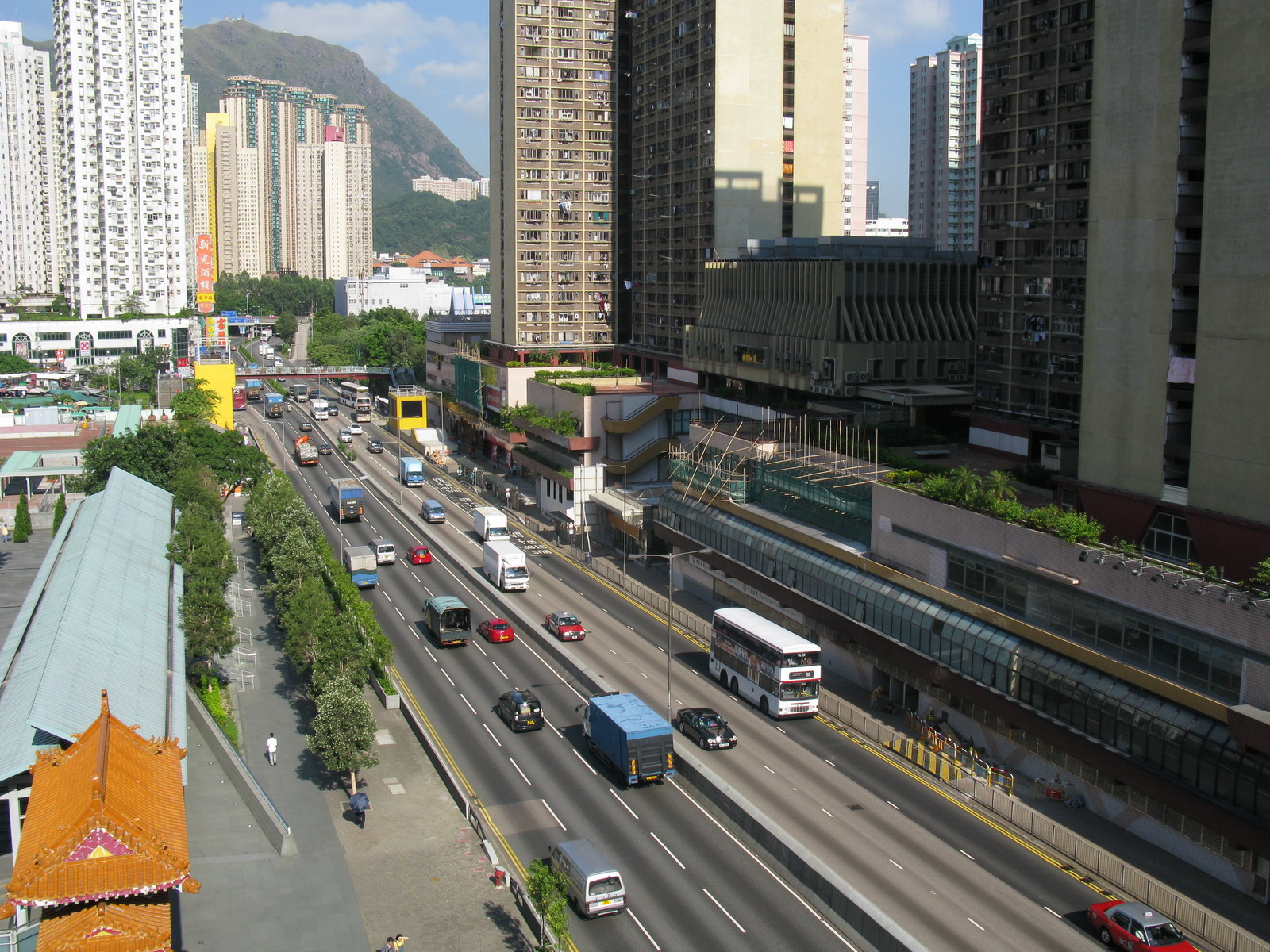
- Lung Cheung Road near Wong Tai Sin
- Interactive map of Lung Cheung Road
- Native name: 龍翔道 (Yue Chinese)
- Length: 6.4 kilometres (4.0 mi)
- Location: Kowloon, Hong Kong
- West end: Ching Cheung Road / Tai Po Road
- East end: Kwun Tong Road

Lung Cheung Road
- Traditional Chinese: 龍翔道
- Simplified Chinese: 龙翔道
Transcriptions
Standard Mandarin
- Hanyu Pinyin: Lóngxiángdào
Yue: Cantonese
- Jyutping: lung4 coeng4 dou6

Lung Cheung Road (Chinese: 龍翔道) is a major road in New Kowloon, Hong Kong. It forms part of Route 7 linking Kwun Tong Road at Ngau Chi Wan and Ching Cheung Road near Tai Wo Ping. It is a dual 3-lane carriageway running in the east-west direction for its entire length.

Kwun Tong (connected by Kwun Tong Road) in Eastern Kowloon was the main manufacturing centre of Hong Kong during the 1960s. To provide a more efficient link to the Kwai Tsing Container Terminals and Tsuen Wan, two roads were built along the hills to the north of developed Kowloon. Tai Po Road's New Territories and New Kowloon parts divide between Ching Cheung Road and Lung Cheung Road.

The section of between Wong Tai Sin and Choi Hung of the Kwun Tong line was built under the road.

== History ==
Lung Cheung Road opened to traffic on 24 June 1961.

== Major junctions ==
- Nam Cheong Street
- Tai Wo Ping Interchange
- Lion Rock Tunnel
- Tate's Cairn Tunnel
- Chuk Yuen Road
- Ma Chai Hang Road
- Po Kong Village Interchange
- Tai Hom Road
- Hammer Hill Road
- Clear Water Bay Road
- Shatin Pass Road (formerly)

== See also ==
- List of streets and roads in Hong Kong
- Tai Po Road
- Kwun Tong Road

Preceded by Kwun Tong Road	Hong Kong Route 7 Lung Cheung Road	Succeeded by Ching Cheung Road
