= Lei Yue Mun Road =

Road in Hong Kong

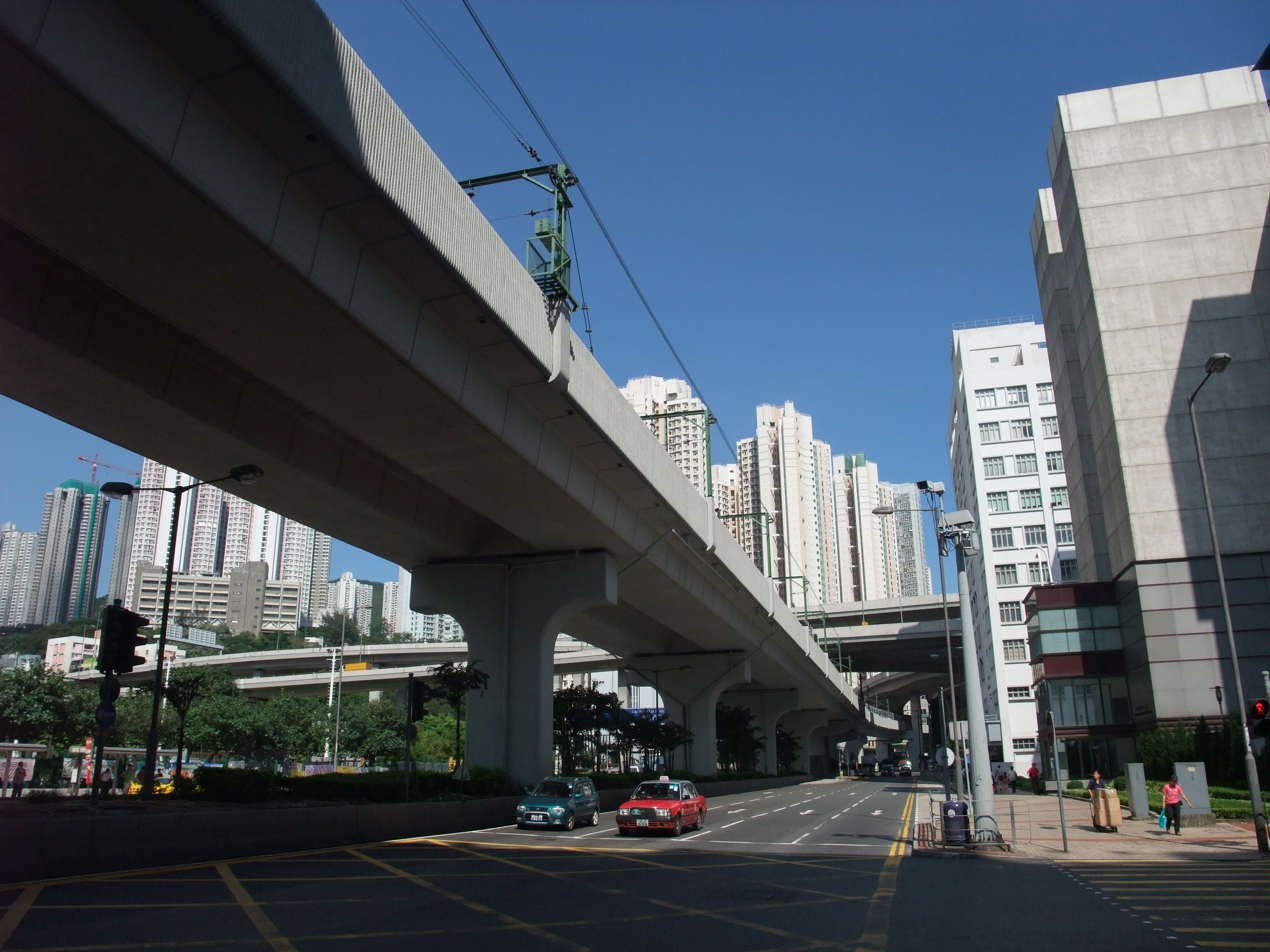
Lei Yue Mun Road near Kwun Tong in June 2008

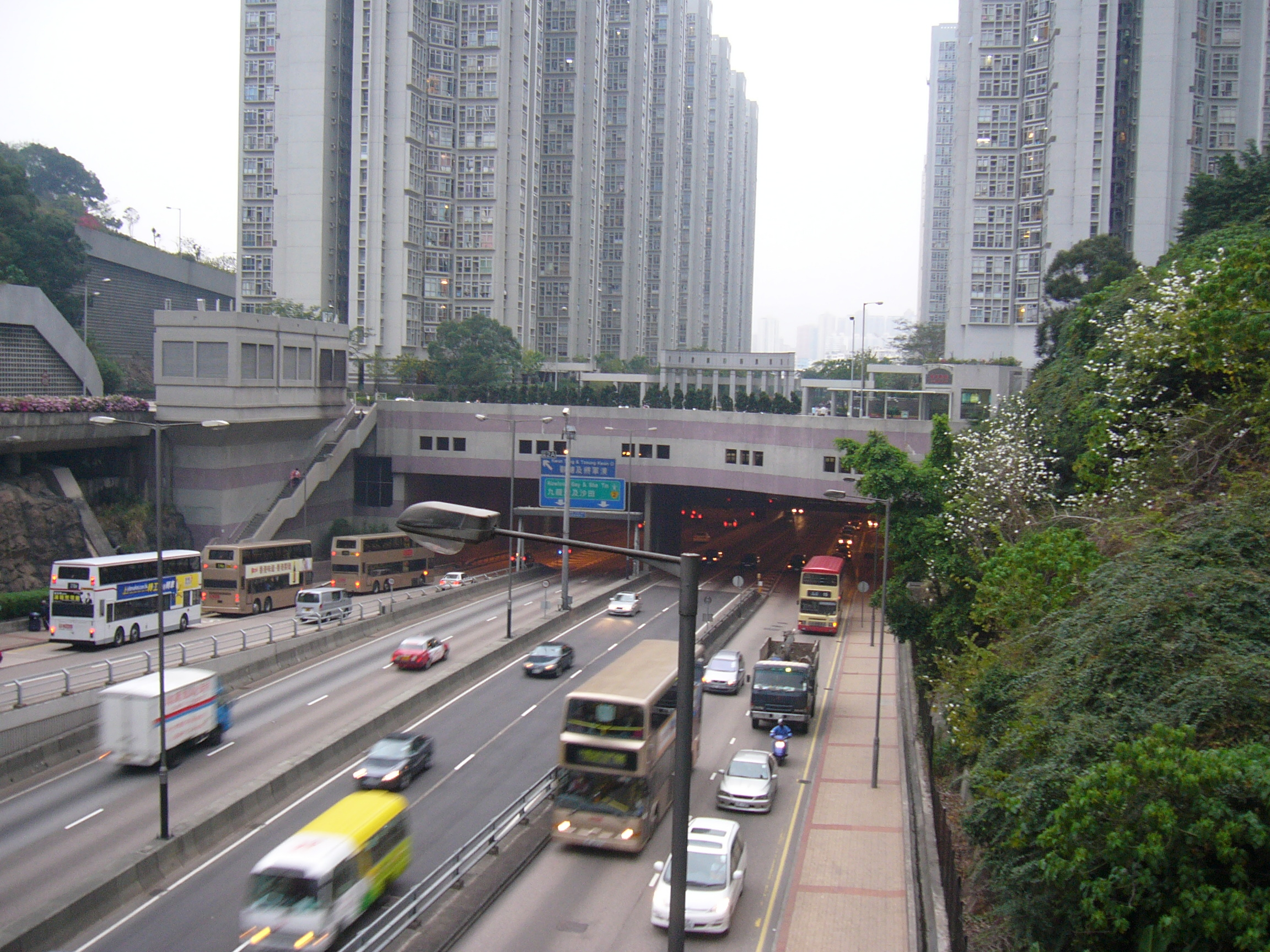
Lei Yue Mun Road near Sceneway Garden in March 2006. This part of the road is a section of Route 2.

Lei Yue Mun Road (Chinese: 鯉魚門道) is a major road in Lam Tin, Hong Kong. It runs from the junction with Tsui Ping Road and Kwun Tong Road near MTR Kwun Tong station to the roundabout with Ko Chiu Road near Lei Yue Mun Estate in Yau Tong. The westernmost section of Lei Yue Mun Road is a part of Hong Kong Route 7 and serves as a connection between Route 7 and Route 2.

The road is named after Lei Yue Mun, a channel roughly 1 km away from its south end. Lei Yue Mun Road is one of the few access roads to Lei Yue Mun.

From west to east, Lei Yue Mun Road succeeds Route 7 from Kwun Tong Road near Tsui Ping Estate, then passes the Kwun Tong Recreation Ground, and transitions into Route 2 from Route 7 at the junction with Tseung Kwan O Road. Then it merges with the Kwun Tong Bypass under Lam Tin station, Lam Tin Bus Terminus and Sceneway Garden, and then approaches the Lei Yue Mun Interchange. On leaving the Lei Yue Mun Interchange, the road separates from Route 2 and junctions Kai Tin Road at a roundabout interchange, Then the road continues south-south east, intersecting Yau Tong Road, and passing St. Antonius Girls' College, while Ko Chiu Road loops off to the east to serve Kwong Tin Estate. The road then passes Yau Tong station and ends at a second intersection with Ko Chiu Road, at a roundabout near Lei Yue Mun Estate and Yau Tong Bus Terminus.

== See also ==
- List of streets and roads in Hong Kong
- Lei Yue Mun Plaza

Preceded by Eastern Harbour Crossing	Hong Kong Route 2 Lei Yue Mun Road	Succeeded by Kwun Tong Bypass

Preceded by Tseung Kwan O Road	Hong Kong Route 7 Lei Yue Mun Road	Succeeded by Kwun Tong Road
