= Apm (Hong Kong) =

Shopping centre in Kwun Tong, Hong Kong

Coordinates: 22°18′45.13″N 114°13′30.20″E

apm

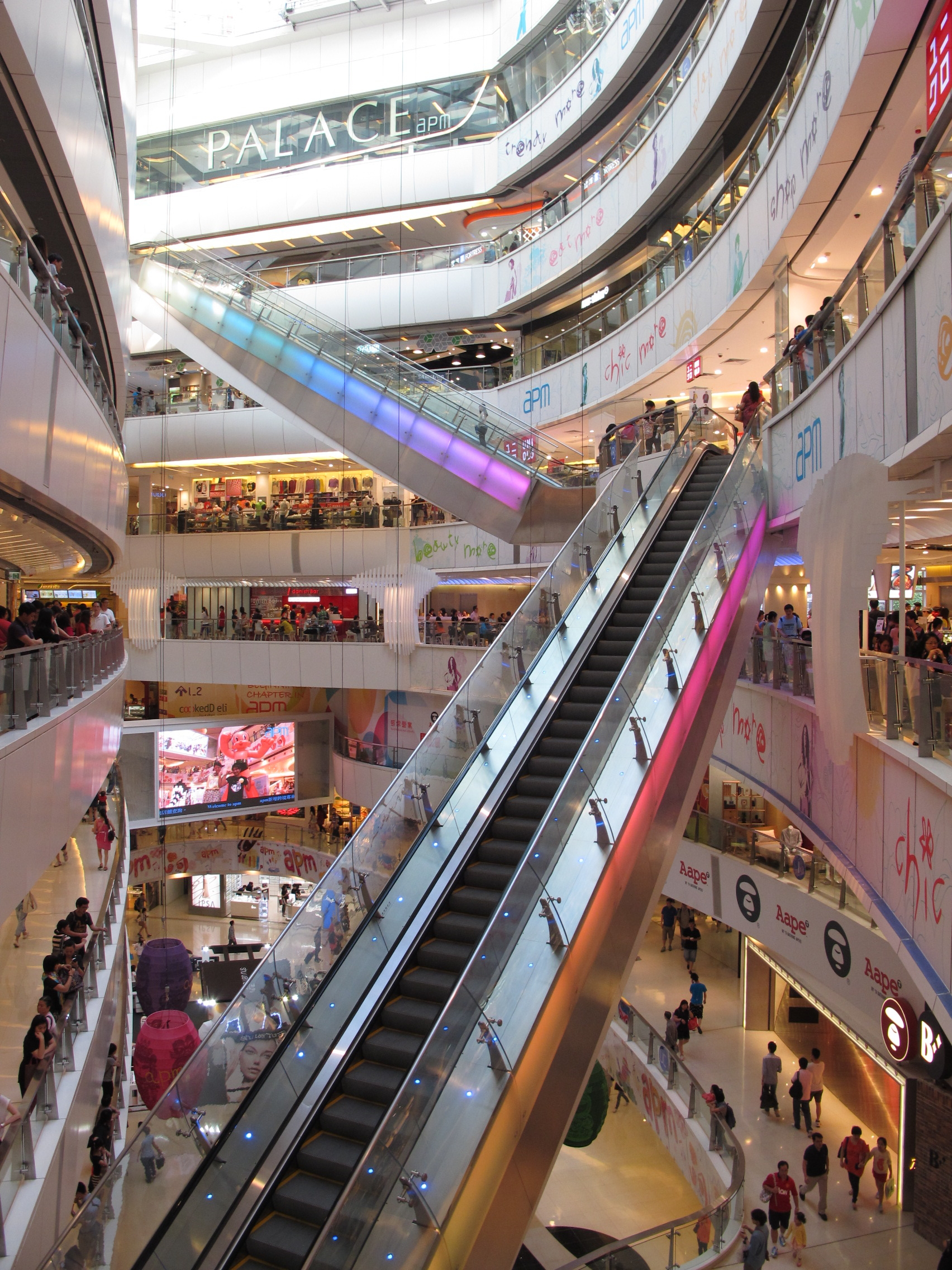
- Location: Kwun Tong, Hong Kong
- Address: 418 Kwun Tong Rd, Kwun Tong
- Opened: 17 July 2005
- Owner: Sun Hung Kai Properties
- Architect: AGC Design, Benoy
- Floors: 10 floors (LG, MTR, UC, 1-6/F, 11/F)
- Website: www.hkapm.com.hk

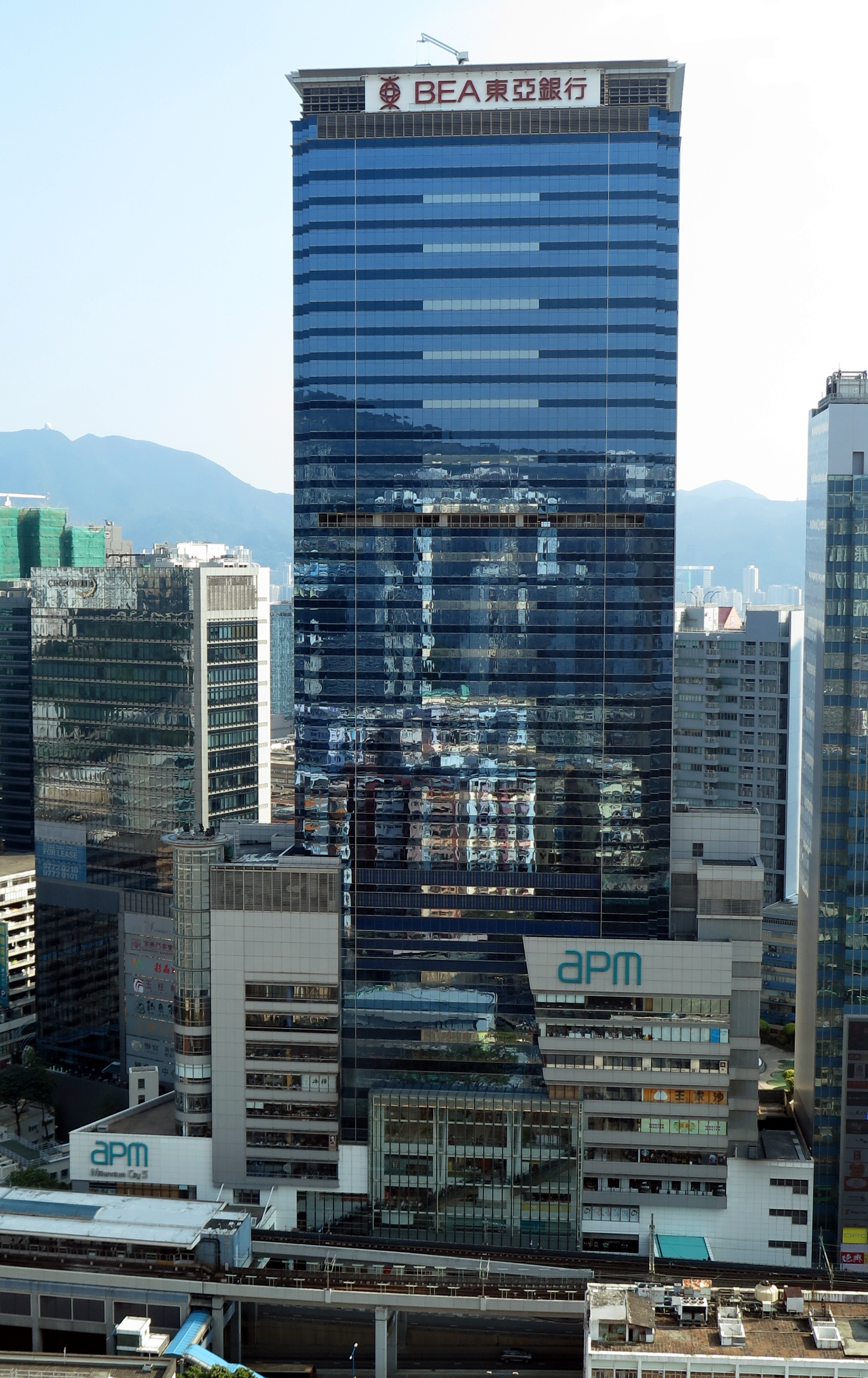
apm Millennium City 5 (2014)

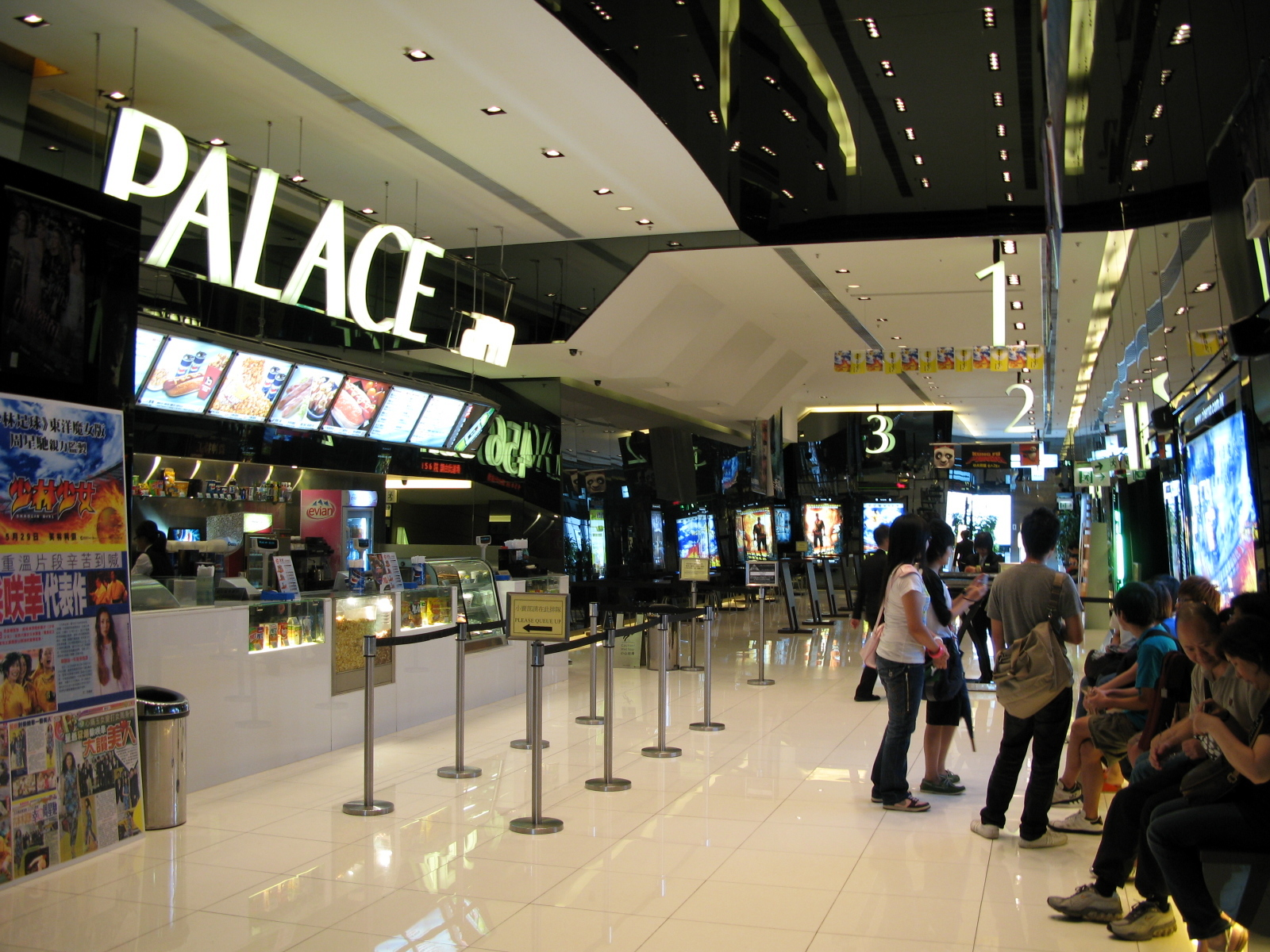
Entrance of PALACE apm

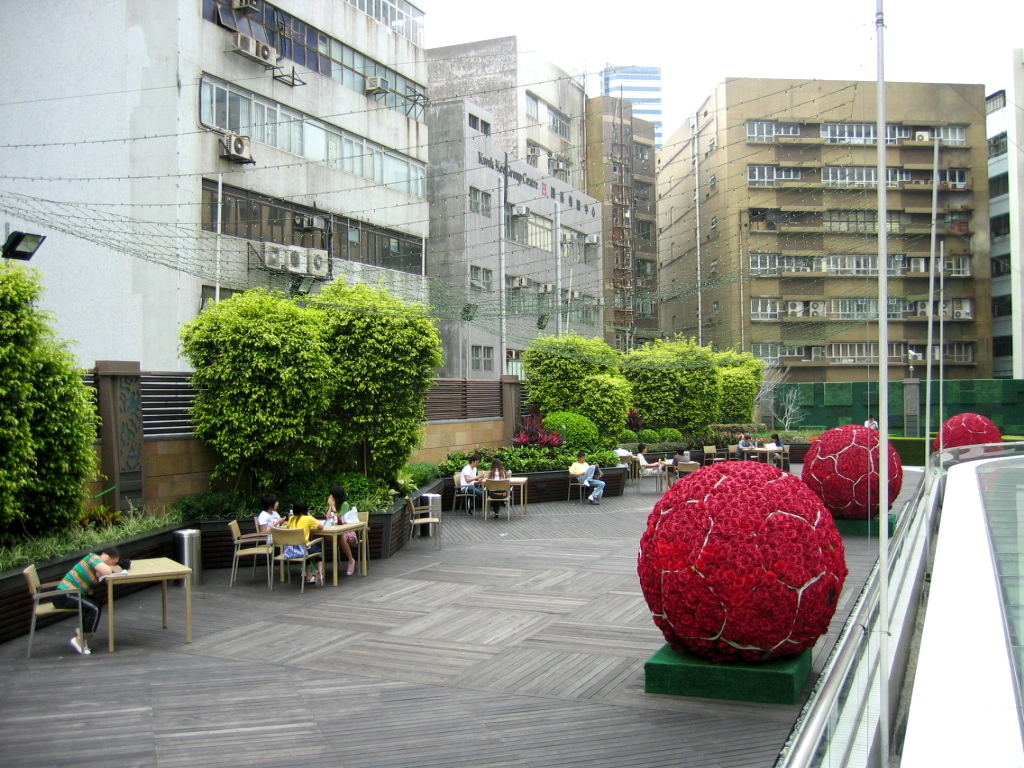
t-park (2/F outdoor rest area)

apm is a large shopping mall in Kwun Tong, Hong Kong, which opened in July 2005. It is located within Millennium City 5, a commercial property developed by Sun Hung Kai Properties. Together with Millennium Cities 1, 2, 3, and 6, they are a group of commercial properties situated along Kwun Tong Road. apm is located next to the Kwun Tong station, with ten storeys and a total retail area of 600,000 square feet (56,000 m^{2}). Underground hourly parking is also available.

== Origins of the name "apm" ==
The name apm is a fusion of "am" (ante meridiem) and "pm" (post meridiem), promoting the mall's theme of a place for night-time shopping and leisure as well as its slogan "play more, sleep less". Therefore, most of the stores are open until after midnight.

The concept of night-time leisure originates from the fact that in recent years, lengthened working hours are causing more stressful lifestyles, yet most shopping malls in Hong Kong are only open until 10pm, so people have fewer places to spend time after work to destress. apm uses its long opening hours to reduce the time constraints of shopping and leisure. For example, the initial opening hours of jp@apm (now located on 6/F) were from 11am to 12am midnight.

In the early years, apm's main sales demographic was younger and youthful shoppers. As Kowloon East had been lacking a large trendy shopping mall, apm was opened in July 2005 and has become one of the shopping and entertainment hotspots for young people in Hong Kong, even attracting residents from Hong Kong Island and New Territories East. The performances held on the lobby level are also a special feature of the mall. Many aspiring singers, music composers and performance groups sing and perform here, and apm has also become a popular venue for many movie studios and record companies to hold promotional activities such as signing sessions and premieres.

== Design and facilities ==
apm is an example of a "vertical mall". With a floor plate of about 50,000 sq ft (5,000 m^{2}), It has a floor area of some 600,000 sq ft (56,000 m^{2}) spanning across 10 floors.

The mall is linked by four air-conditioned footbridges, connecting to the MTR Kwun Tong Station, Yue Man Square / Kwun Tong Road, Entrepot Centre and Crocodile Centre.

Two express escalators are located in the middle of the mall to take visitors between levels.

== Tenants ==
Notable tenants include:

- YATA Supermarket, occupying 32,100 square feet (2,980 m^{2}) on LG.
- Five Guys on C (Concourse Floor).
- H&M, on L1.
- B+ cinema (previously PALACE apm), a cinema under the Broadway Circuit, located on the top floor (L6).
- Muji
- Uniqlo
- Apple Inc.

== Transport ==
- MTR:
  - Kwun Tong line: Kwun Tong station (Exit A2)
- Bus,
- Public light bus,
- Kowloon public light bus,
- New Territories public light bus.
- 24hrs Cross-Border Express:
  - Kwun Tong Line – Lam Tin MTR Station ↔ Shenzhen Huanggang

== See also ==
- Beijing apm
- Shanghai iapm
