= Tseung Kwan O Tunnel =

Road tunnel in New Territories, Hong Kong

Coordinates: 22.318824°N 114.245827°E

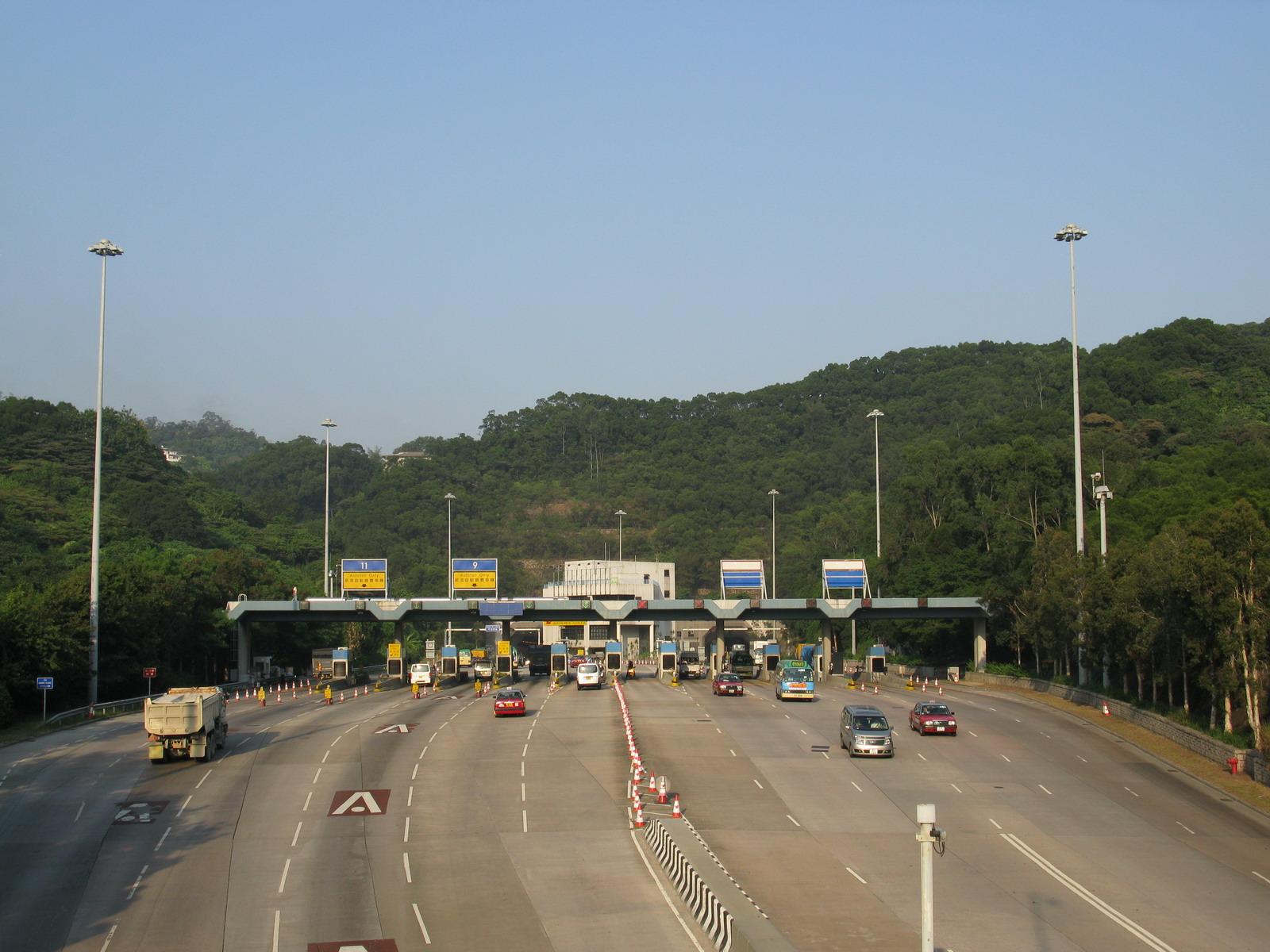
- Tseung Kwan O Tunnel, Sau Mau Ping portal
- Interactive map of Tseung Kwan O Tunnel

Overview
- Location: Hong Kong
- Route: Route 7
- Start: Sau Mau Ping
- End: Tseung Kwan O New Town near Tsui Lam Estate

Operation
- Work began: September 1987; 39 years ago
- Opened: 9 November 1990; 36 years ago
- Owner: Hong Kong Government
- Operator: Greater Lucky (H.K.) Company
- Traffic: Vehicular
- Toll: No

Technical
- Length: 900 metres (3,000 ft)
- No. of lanes: 4 (2 per direction)
- Operating speed: 70 kilometres per hour (43 mph)

Tseung Kwan O Tunnel (simplified Chinese: 将军澳隧道; traditional Chinese: 將軍澳隧道; Jyutping: zoeng1 gwan1 ou3 seoi6 dou6) is a 900-metre tunnel beneath Ma Yau Tong in Hong Kong. The tunnel was opened on 9 November 1990. Part of Route 7, it links Sau Mau Ping, Kwun Tong, Kowloon and the Tseung Kwan O New Town, Sai Kung District, the New Territories. It was used by 80,385 vehicles daily in 2011.

The flat toll fee for the tunnel is HK$3 since opening. The toll fee has been waived since the opening of Tseung Kwan O–Lam Tin Tunnel on 11 December 2022.

This tunnel is connected to Tseung Kwan O Road on the Kowloon side along with its toll plaza, and Tseung Kwan O Tunnel Road on the Tseung Kwan O side.

Tseung Kwan O Tunnel is currently managed by Greater Lucky (H.K.) Company Limited.

== See also ==
- Transport in Hong Kong
- List of tunnels and bridges in Hong Kong

Preceded by Tseung Kwan O Tunnel Road	Hong Kong Route 7 Tseung Kwan O Tunnel	Succeeded by Tseung Kwan O Road
