= Route 2 (Hong Kong) =

Road in Hong Kong

Route 2
- Route 2 highlighted in red

Route information
- Maintained by Highways Department
- Length: 18.8 km (11.7 mi) 18.6 kilometres (11.6 mi) southbound
- Existed: 1989 (Eastern Harbour Crossing/Route 6); 1991 (Tate's Cairn Tunnel)–present

Major junctions
- South end: Route 4 in Quarry Bay
- Route 6 in Lam Tin; Route 7 in Kwun Tong; Route 5 in Ngau Tau Kok; Route 7 near Choi Hung; Sha Lek Highway in Siu Lek Yuen
- North end: Route 9 in Ma Liu Shui

Location
- Country: China
- Special administrative region: Hong Kong
- Districts: Eastern, Kwun Tong, Wong Tai Sin, Sha Tin

Highway system
- Transport in Hong Kong; Routes; Roads and Streets
← Route 1	→ Route 3

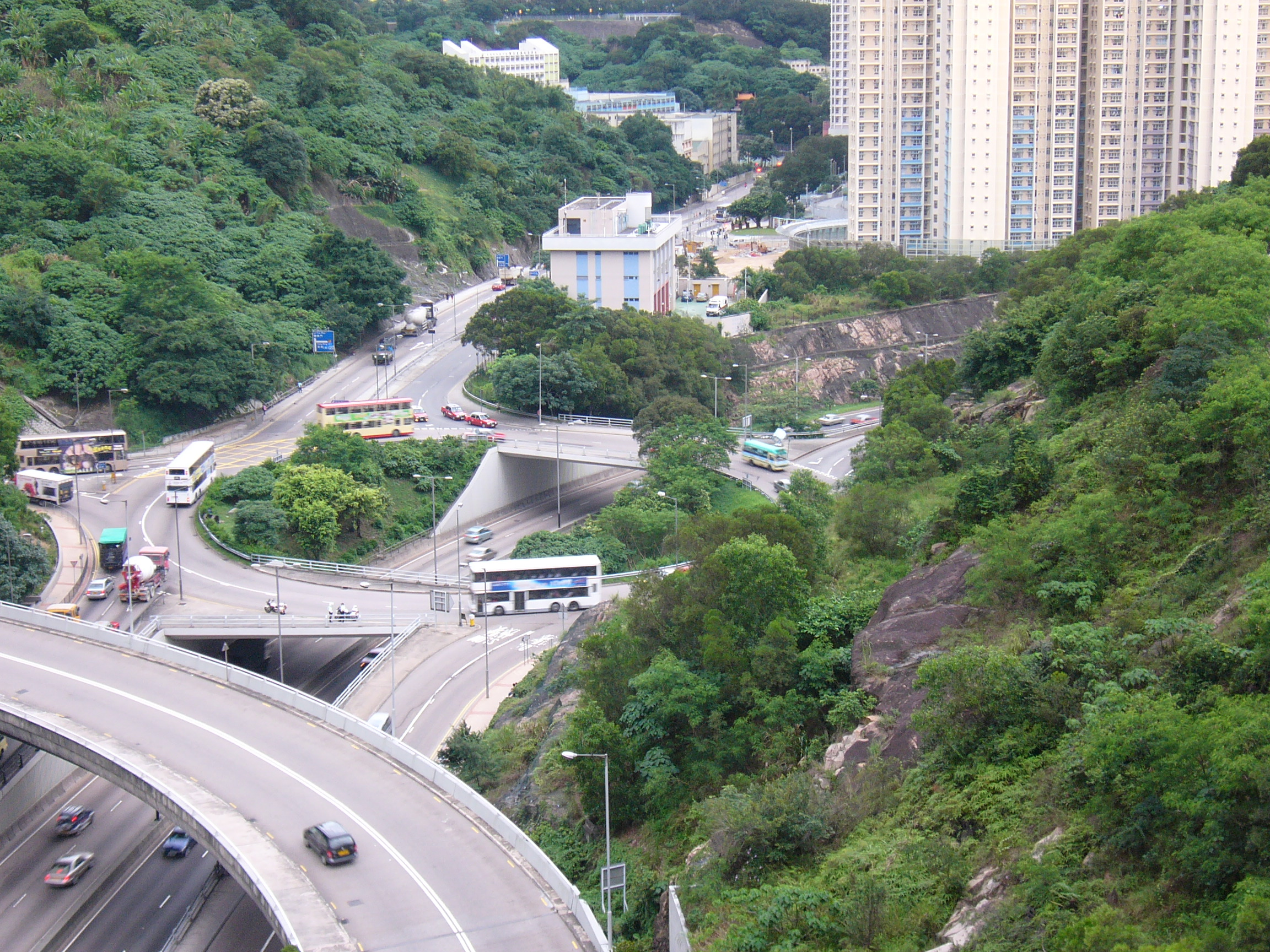
Lei Yue Mun Interchange, northern entrance to the Eastern Harbour Crossing

Route 2 (Chinese: 二號幹綫; Jyutping: ji6 hou6 gon3 sin3) of Hong Kong is a series of expressways that runs from Quarry Bay of Hong Kong Island to Ma Liu Shui of the New Territories East, formerly known as route 6, and renamed as route 2 in 2004 under the route numbering scheme proposed in the same year. Route 2 consists of 4 parts, from South to North:

- The Eastern Harbour Crossing starting from Quarry Bay, where it joins into the Island Eastern Corridor (Route 4), across Victoria Harbour and ending at Lam Tin, then junction to Tseung Kwan O - Lam Tin Tunnel.
- The Kwun Tong Bypass succeeds the EHC at Lei Yue Mun Interchange and goes along the coast of Kowloon Bay, junctions Route 5 and Route 7 and continues to Diamond Hill.
- Tate's Cairn Tunnel continues the route from Diamond Hill, cutting through Tate's Cairn to Shek Mun Interchange, junctioning the Sha Lek Highway.
- Tate's Cairn Highway, takes the route 2 to its terminus at Ma Liu Shui, where it joins into Tolo Highway of Route 9.

Like Route 3, Route 8, Route 9 and Route 10, most of the route consists of expressways.

== Exits and Interchanges ==
District	Location	Road Name	km	mi	Exit	Destinations	Notes
Eastern	Quarry Bay	Eastern Harbour Crossing	0.0	0.0	1A	Route 4 Island Eastern Corridor (eastbound) – Tai Koo, Sai Wan Ho, Shau Kei Wan, Shek O, Stanley, Chai Wan and Siu Sai Wan	Joins Route 4
Eastern	Quarry Bay	Eastern Harbour Crossing	0.0	0.0	1B	Route 4 Island Eastern Corridor (westbound) – Quarry Bay, North Point, Causeway Bay, Happy Valley and Aberdeen	Joins Route 4
Victoria Harbour		Eastern Harbour Crossing	0.3 - 2.6	0.2 - 1.6	Eastern Harbour Tunnel (tolled)		
Kwun Tong	Lam Tin	Eastern Harbour Crossing	2.7	1.7	1C	Route 6 (Lam Tin Interchange) – Tseung Kwan O via Tseung Kwan O-Lam Tin Tunnel	
Kwun Tong	Lam Tin	Lei Yue Mun Road	3.0	1.9	2	Lei Yue Mun Road – Lam Tin, Yau Tong and Lei Yue Mun	
Kwun Tong	Lam Tin	Kwun Tong Bypass	3.6	2.2	2A	Route 7 Tseung Kwan O Road/Kwun Tong Road – Kwun Tong Business Area, Tseung Kwan O, Sai Kung and Clear Water Bay	Northbound exit and southbound entrance only
Kwun Tong	Kwun Tong	Kwun Tong Bypass	4.3	2.7	2B	Route 7 Tseung Kwan O Road – Tseung Kwan O, Sai Kung and Clear Water Bay	Southbound exit and northbound entrance only
Kwun Tong	Kwun Tong	Kwun Tong Bypass	5.1	3.2	2C	Wai Yip Street – Kwun Tong Business Area and Cha Kwo Ling	Northbound entrance only, southbound exit and entrance
Kwun Tong	Kowloon Bay	Kwun Tong Bypass	6.6	4.1	2D	Route 5 Kai Fuk Road and Wang Chiu Road – Kowloon Bay, Cruise Terminal, To Kwa Wan and Hung Hom	Northbound exit and southbound entrance only
Kwun Tong	Choi Hung	Kwun Tong Bypass	8.8	5.5	3	Prince Edward Road East (westbound) – Kowloon City, Mong Kok and To Kwa Wan	Northbound exit and southbound entrance only
Wong Tai Sin	Choi Hung	Kwun Tong Bypass	9.3	5.8	3A	Route 7 Kwun Tong Road (eastbound) – Kowloon Bay, Cruise Terminal and Kwun Tong	Southbound exit and northbound entrance only
Wong Tai Sin	Diamond Hill	Tate's Cairn Highway	9.8	6.1	3B	Route 7 Lung Cheung Road (eastbound) – Tsz Wan Shan, Diamond Hill, Ngau Chi Wan, Pik Uk and Sai Kung	Southbound exit and northbound entrance only
Kowloon Hills		Tate's Cairn Highway	10.0 - 13.9	6.2 - 8.6	Tate's Cairn Tunnel (tolled)		
Sha Tin	Siu Lek Yuen	Tate's Cairn Highway	14.8	9.2	4	Sha Tin Wai Road/Siu Lek Yuen Road – Siu Lek Yuen	
Sha Tin	Siu Lek Yuen	Tate's Cairn Highway	14.9	9.3	5	Sha Lek Highway towards Route 1 Sha Tin Road (southbound) – Sha Tin Central, Kowloon Central and Tsuen Wan	
Sha Tin	Shek Mun	Tate's Cairn Highway	16.6	10.3	6	Tai Chung Kiu Road – Shek Mun, Tai Shui Hang and Sha Tin Central	
Sha Tin	A Kung Kok	Tate's Cairn Highway	17.5	10.9	7	Ma On Shan Road – Ma On Shan and Sai Kung	
Sha Tin	Ma Liu Shui	Tate's Cairn Highway	18.5	11.5	7A	Chak Cheung Street – Ma Liu Shui, Pak Shek Kok, Race Course, Science Park and University	
Sha Tin	Ma Liu Shui	Tate's Cairn Highway	18.8	11.7	Route 9 – Tai Po and Fanling		Joins Tolo Highway (anticlockwise only)

== See also ==
- Kwun Tong Bypass
- Tate's Cairn Highway
- West Kowloon Corridor
