= Tate's Cairn Highway =

Road in Hong Kong

Coordinates: 22.3959°N 114.2137°E

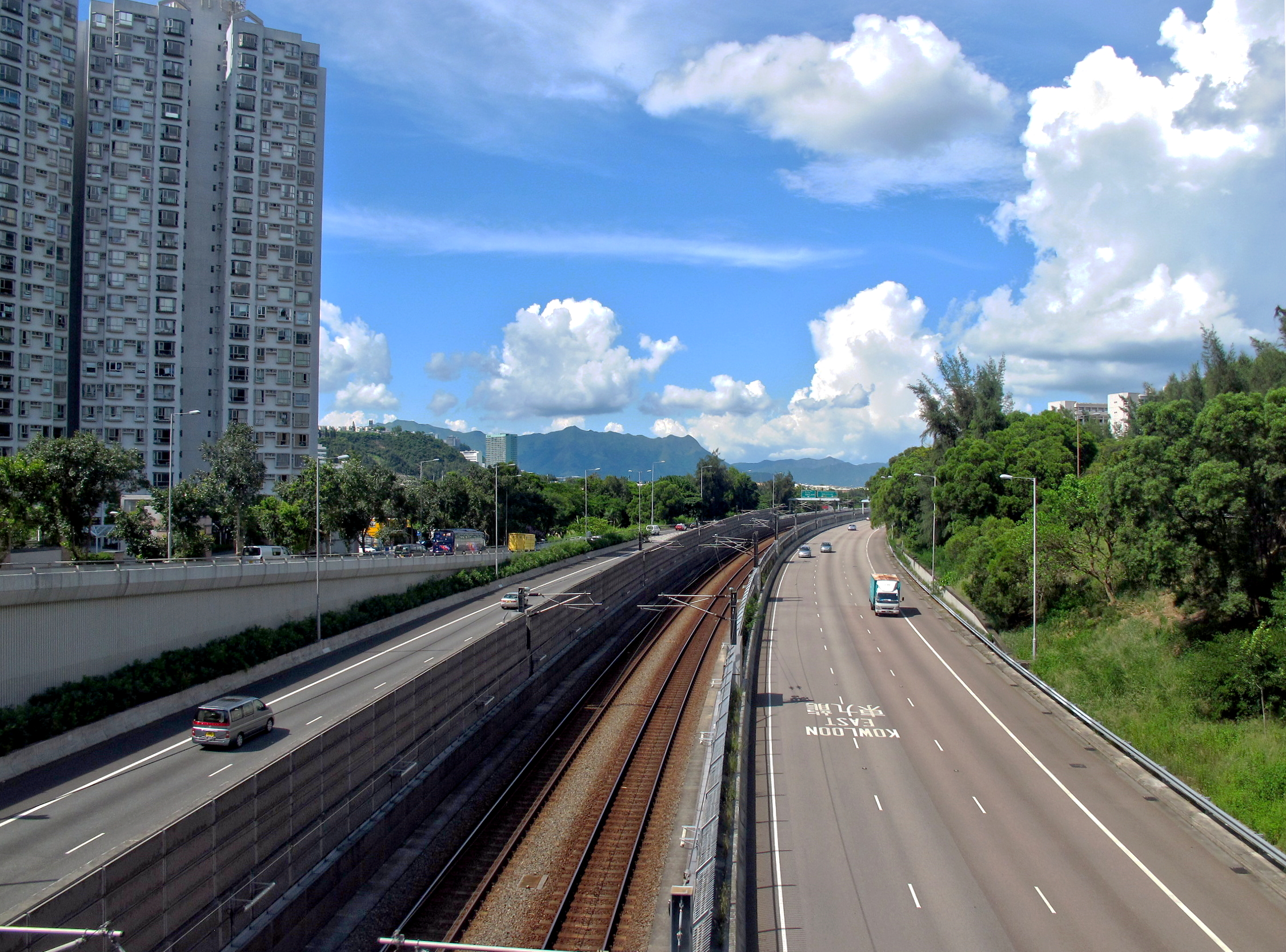
Tate's Cairn Highway in August 2011

Tate's Cairn Highway (Chinese: 大老山公路; Jyutping: daai6 lou5 saan1 gung1 lou6), opened on 26 June 1991, is a dual 3-lane expressway in Hong Kong. It links Tate's Cairn Tunnel and Ma Liu Shui Interchange, forming a part of Route 2 (formerly known as Route 6).

From the Ma Liu Shui Interchange, where it connects with Route 9, the expressway crosses the estuary of the Shing Mun River. It then turns southwards, interchanging at Shek Mun with a distributor road (Tai Chung Kiu Road), and reaches Siu Lek Yuen, where the highway splits. One branch leads to Tate's Cairn Tunnel (which continues as Route 2), and the other leads to Sha Lek Highway, which eventually joins Route 1 at Sha Tin Road.

The highway is named after Tate's Cairn.

== Interchanges ==
Tate's Cairn Highway in its entirety falls within the boundaries of Sha Tin District.

Tate's Cairn Highway
Location	km	Interchange name	Exit	Destinations	Notes
Ma Liu Shui	18.6	Ma Liu Shui Interchange	–	Route 9 (Tolo Highway) – Tai Po & Fanling	Northern terminus; end of Route 2
Ma Liu Shui	18.4	Ma Liu Shui Interchange	7A	Chak Cheung Street – Ma Liu Shui, University, Science Park, Pak Shek Kok, Race Course	Northbound exit and southbound entrance
A Kung Kok	17.4		7	Ma On Shan Road – Ma On Shan & Sai Kung	
Shek Mun	16.0	Shek Mun Interchange	6	Tai Chung Kiu Road and A Kung Kok Street – Shek Mun, Tai Shui Hang, Sha Tin Central, Tsuen Wan	
Siu Lek Yuen	15.1		4	Siu Lek Yuen Road and Sha Tin Wai Road – Siu Lek Yuen, Prince of Wales Hospital	Southbound exit and northbound entrance
Siu Lek Yuen	15.1		5	Sha Lek Highway – Kowloon (Central, West)	Southbound exit and northbound entrance
Siu Lek Yuen	14.4		5	Sha Lek Highway – Sha Tin Central	Northbound exit and southbound entrance
Siu Lek Yuen	14.3		4	Sha Tin Wai Road – Siu Lek Yuen, Prince of Wales Hospital	Southbound exit and northbound entrance
Siu Lek Yuen			–	Tate's Cairn Tunnel	Southern terminus; Route 2 continues
1.000 mi = 1.609 km; 1.000 km = 0.621 mi: Incomplete access; Tolled; Route transition

== See also ==
- List of streets and roads in Hong Kong

Other highways in Kowloon and New Territories:

- Tsing Kwai Highway – Route 3
- Tuen Mun Road – Route 9
- West Kowloon Highway – Route 3
- Tsing Long Highway – Route 3
- Cheung Tsing Highway – Route 3
- Kwun Tong Bypass – Route 2

Tate's Cairn Highway Hong Kong Route 2 Chronology
Preceded by Tate's Cairn Tunnel	Tate's Cairn Highway	Succeeded by Northern Terminus (Linking Route 9)
