= Shek Lung Tsai =

Village in Sha Tin District, Hong Kong

Coordinates: 22.394336°N 114.241156°E

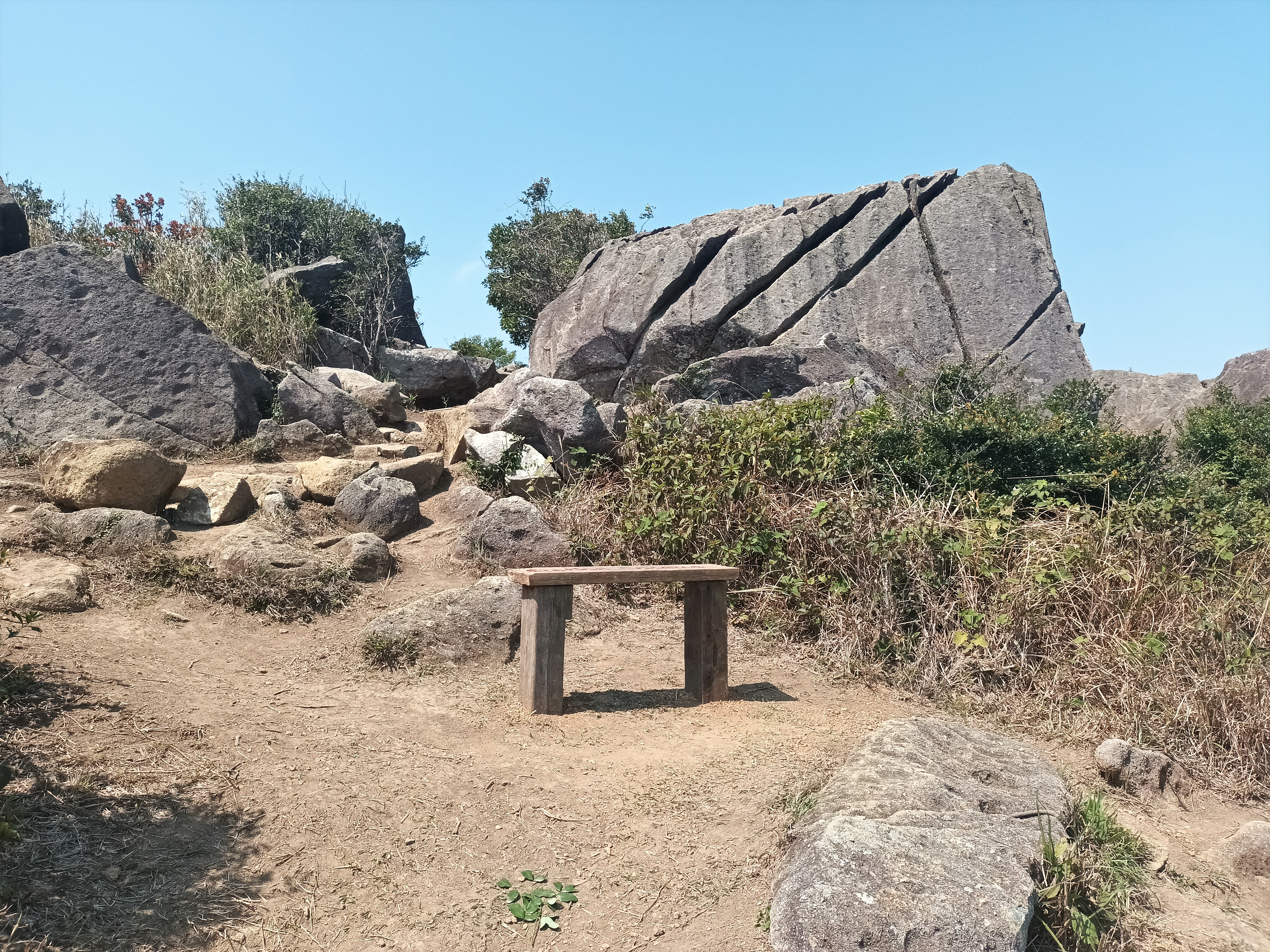
Rocks of Shek Lung Tsai Stone Forest (石壟仔石林) near Luk Chau Shan.

Shek Lung Tsai (Chinese: 石壟仔) is a village in Sha Tin District, Hong Kong.

== Administration ==
Shek Lung Tsai is a recognized village under the New Territories Small House Policy.

== See also ==
- Luk Chau Shan
- Shek Lung Tsai New Village
