= Sha Lek Highway =

Designated expressway, Hong Kong

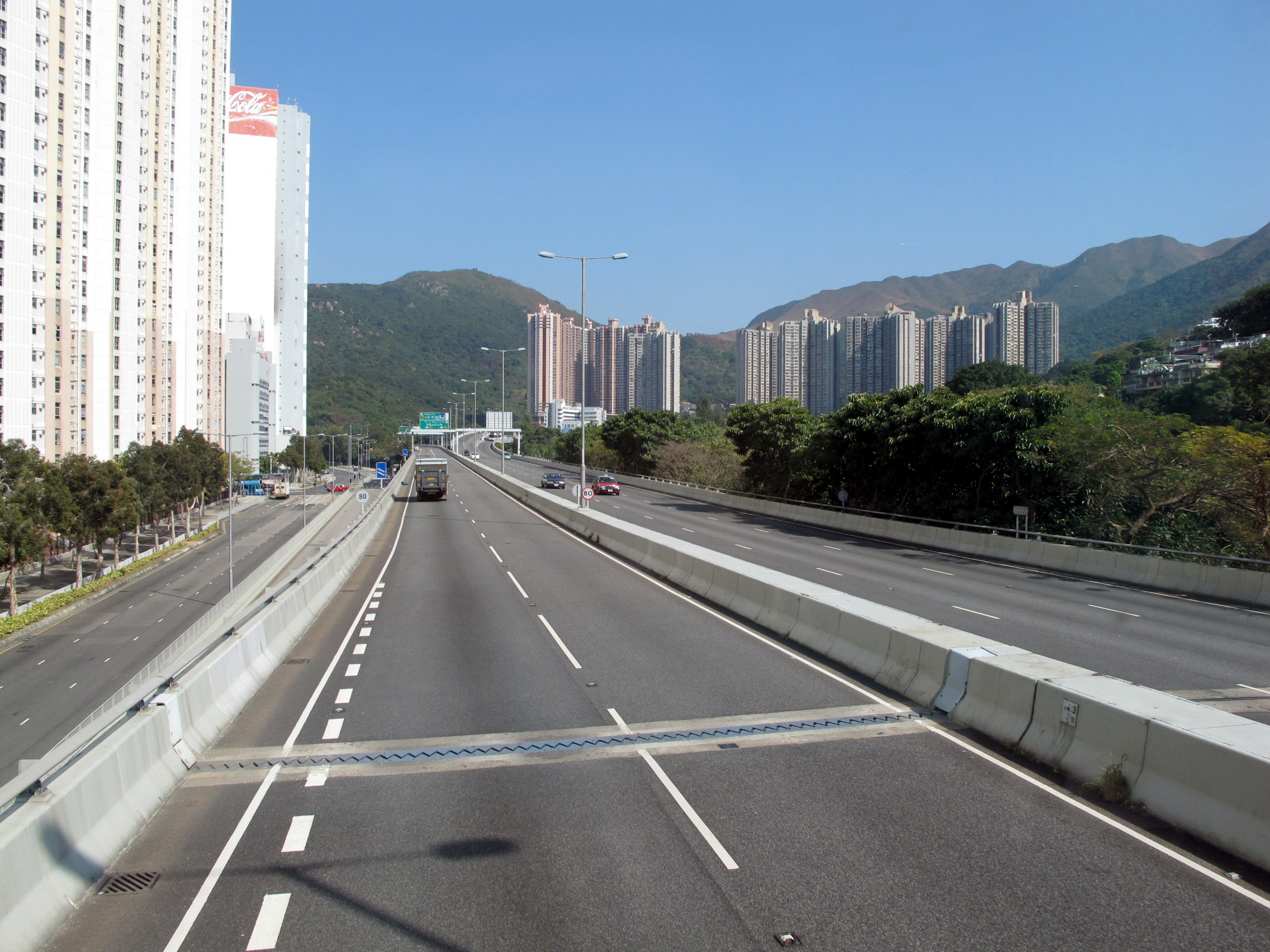
- Sha Lek Highway

Route information
- Length: 2.2 km (1.4 mi)

Major junctions
- East end: Route 2 (Tate's Cairn Highway)
- West end: Route 1 (Sha Tin Road)

Location
- Country: China
- Special administrative region: Hong Kong

Highway system
- Transport in Hong Kong; Routes; Roads and Streets

Sha Lek Highway (Chinese: 沙瀝公路), opened on 26 June 1991, is a section of expressway in Sha Tin District, New Territories, Hong Kong. It runs 1.5 km from Tate's Cairn Highway in Siu Lek Yuen to Sha Tin Road and Sha Tin Wai Road and has a speed limit of 80 km/h. It is one of the only three expressways in Hong Kong not assigned to any numbered highway system (the others being Penny's Bay Highway and Hong Kong Link Road).

== Interchanges ==
The entire route is in Sha Tin District.

Location	km	mi	Destinations	Notes
Siu Lek Yuen	0.0– 0.9	0.0– 0.56	Route 2 (Tate's Cairn Highway)	Directional-T interchange
Sha Tin	1.3– 1.9	0.81– 1.2	Sha Tin Wai Road	No access from Sha Tin Wai Road eastbound to Sha Lek Highway westbound
Sha Tin	2.2	1.4	Route 1 (Sha Tin Road)	To/from Route 1 southbound only
1.000 mi = 1.609 km; 1.000 km = 0.621 mi: Incomplete access

== See also ==
- List of streets and roads in Hong Kong
