= Sha Tin Road =

Expressway in Hong Kong

Sha Tin Road
- Part of Route 1

Route information
- Maintained by Highways Department
- Length: 3.4 km (2.1 mi)
- Existed: 1984–present

Major junctions
- South end: Sha Tin (near Sha Tin Tau)
- 5 in total; Route 9 at Fo Tan
- North end: Sha Tin (near Fo Tan)

Location
- Country: China
- Special administrative region: Hong Kong

Highway system
- Transport in Hong Kong; Routes; Roads and Streets

Sha Tin Road
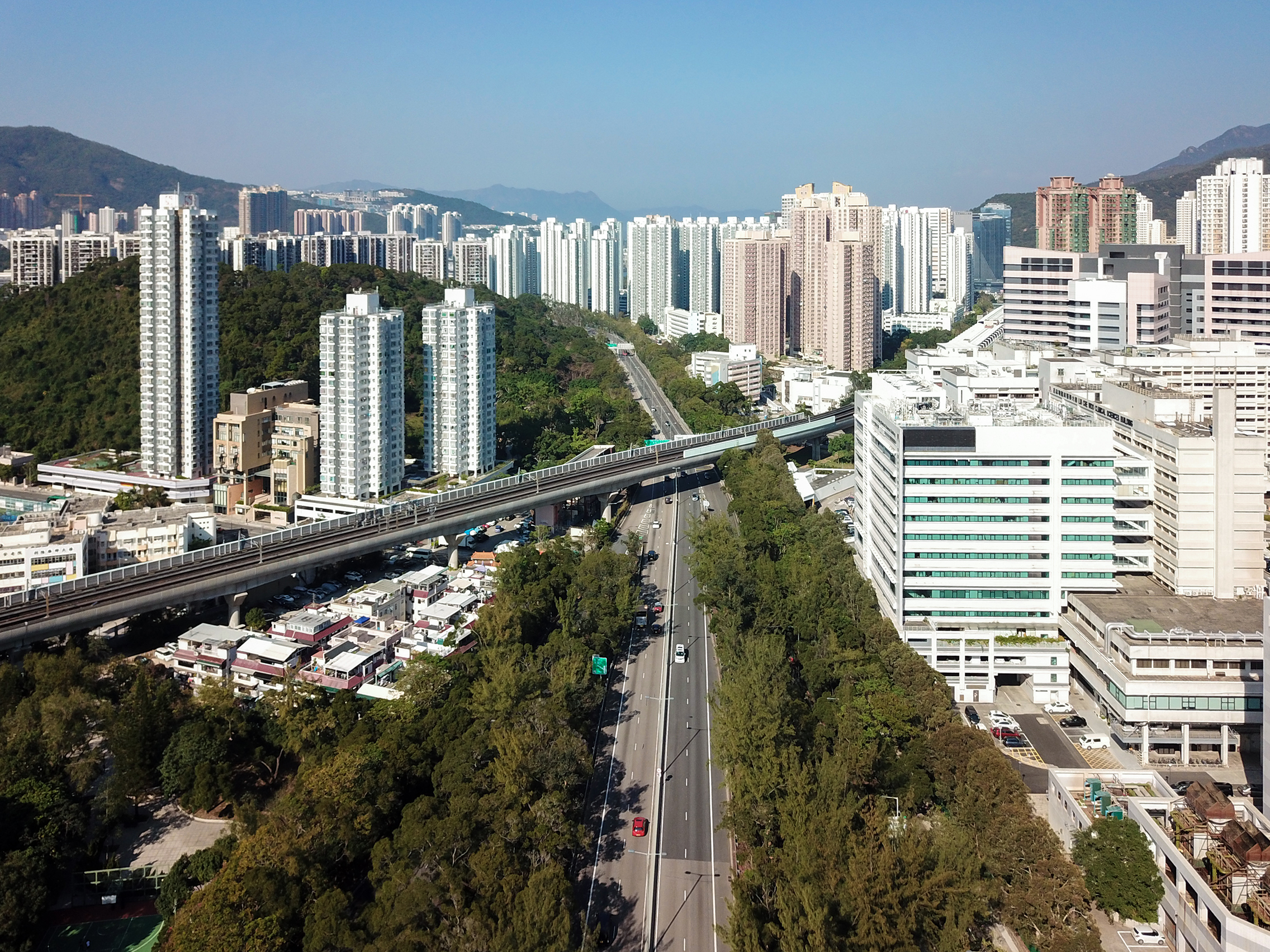
- Sha Tin Road
- Chinese: 沙田路
Transcriptions
Standard Mandarin
- Hanyu Pinyin: Shātián Lù
Yue: Cantonese
- Yale Romanization: sa1 tin4 lou6
- Jyutping: saa1 tin4 lou6

Sha Tin Road (Chinese: 沙田路; Jyutping: saa1 tin4 lou6), opened on 6 November 1984, is a dual-2 lane expressway in Hong Kong. It links Lion Rock Tunnel Road and Tai Po Road — Sha Tin, forming a part of Route 1.

This 3.4 km road is mostly elevated, running at the foothills on the eastern bank of the Shing Mun River, bypassing the town centre of Sha Tin, which is to its west. The road crosses the river on Dragon Bridge (錦龍橋) near City One and joins Tai Po Road – Sha Tin near the Sha Tin Racecourse.

== Interchanges and Junctions ==
The section of Route 1 that runs through Sha Tin Road has 6 exits. They are numbered 11A, 11B, 12, 12A, 12B, and 12C. The entire road is in Sha Tin District.

Sha Tin Road
| Location | km | Exit | Destinations | Notes |
| Sha Tin Wai | 17.4 | | Lion Rock Tunnel Road - Tai Wai, Kowloon | Southern terminus; Route 1 continues |
| Sha Tin Wai | 17.4 | 11A | Lion Rock Tunnel Road - Tsuen Wan, Sha Tin Central | Northbound exit and southbound entrance only |
| Sha Tin Wai | 18.3 | 11B | Sha Lek Highway - Ma On Shan, Kowloon East | Northbound exit and southbound entrance only |
| Yuen Chau Kok | 18.8 | 12 | Sha Tin Wai Road - Sha Tin Wai, Yuen Chau Kok, Kowloon East | |
| Yuen Chau Kok | 19.5 | 12A | Fo Tan Road / Tai Chung Kiu Road - Fo Tan, Shek Mun | Northbound exit and southbound entrance only |
| Fo Tan | 20.4 | 12B | Fo Tan Road - Sha Tin Central | Southbound exit and northbound entrance only |
| Fo Tan | 21.1 | 12C | Yuen Wo Road - Penfold Park | Northbound exit and southbound entrance only |
| Fo Tan | 21.1 | | Route 9 ( Tai Po Road — Sha Tin) northbound - Ma Liu Shui, Tai Po | Northern terminus; end of Route 1 |
1.000 mi = 1.609 km; 1.000 km = 0.621 mi: Incomplete access; Tolled; Route transition

== See also ==
- List of streets and roads in Hong Kong
- Tate's Cairn Highway
- Tsing Kwai Highway
- Tuen Mun Road
- West Kowloon Highway

| Preceded by Lion Rock Tunnel Road | Hong Kong Route 1 Sha Tin Road | Succeeded by Northern Terminus |
