= Tate's Cairn Tunnel =

Road tunnel in Hong Kong

Coordinates: 22.3640°N 114.2119°E

- Interactive map of Tate's Cairn Tunnel

Overview
- Location: Hong Kong
- Route: Route 2
- Start: Diamond Hill, New Kowloon
- End: Siu Lek Yuen, Sha Tin, New Territories

Operation
- Work began: July 1988; 38 years ago
- Opened: 26 June 1991; 35 years ago
- Owner: Hong Kong Government, formerly British Hong Kong
- Traffic: Vehicular
- Toll: Yes

Technical
- Length: 3,913 metres (12,838 ft) – Northbound; 3,945 metres (12,943 ft) – Southbound
- No. of lanes: 4 (2 per direction)
- Operating speed: 70 km/h (45 mph)

Tate's Cairn Tunnel
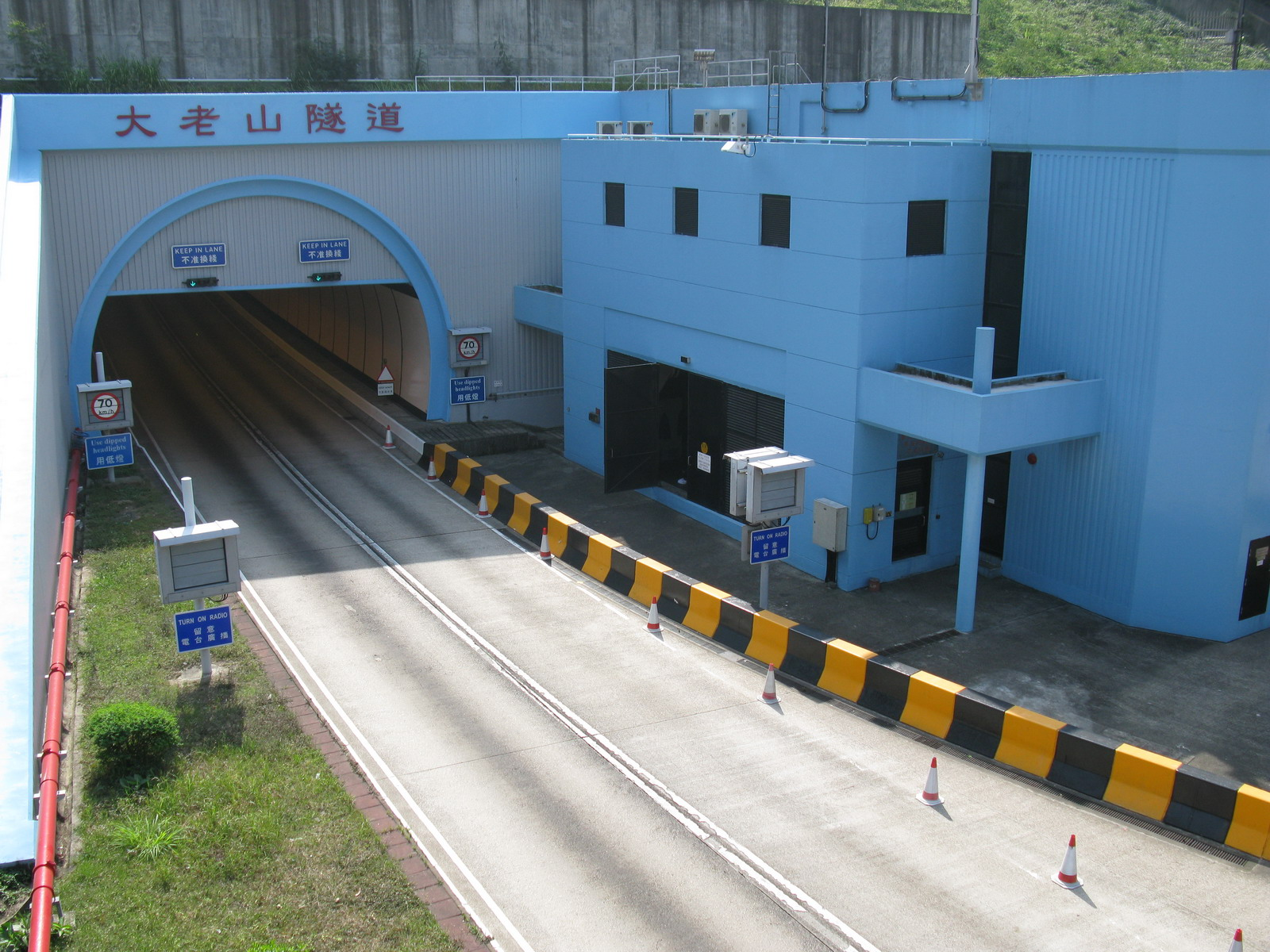
- Tate's Cairn Tunnel
- Chinese: 大老山隧道
Transcriptions
Standard Mandarin
- Hanyu Pinyin: Dàlǎoshān Suìdào
Yue: Cantonese
- Jyutping: daai^{6} lou^{5} saan^{1} seoi^{6} dou^{6}

Tate's Cairn Tunnel is a four-lane road tunnel in Hong Kong. Constructed as part of Route 2, it links Diamond Hill, New Kowloon with Siu Lek Yuen, Sha Tin, New Territories East. It opened on 26 June 1991.

Its toll plaza is situated on the Sha Tin side, leading to Tate's Cairn Highway, Sha Lek Highway and various local roads. The tunnel joins the Kwun Tong Bypass and is connected with Lung Cheung Road and Hammer Hill Road and several local roads on the Kowloon side.

Tate's Cairn Tunnel is the third longest road tunnel in the New Territories and in Hong Kong, and the second longest over land, with the northbound tube having a length of 3,913 metres (2.43 miles) and southbound tube having a length of 3,945 metres (2.45 miles), after Tuen Mun–Chek Lap Kok Tunnel (at 3.1 miles (4.99 km)) and Lung Shan Tunnel (3 miles (4.83 km)) – It was the longest when it opened.

== History ==
Before the tunnel, the traffic between Diamond Hill and Sha Toon had grown 12% annually since 1977, leading to heavy traffic jams at the Lion Rock Tunnel. The HK authorities deemed it unfeasible to further increase traffic through that tunnel. The feasibility study of the tunnel was approved on 2 May 1986 and granted to the companies Gammon Construction and Nishimatsu.

Construction of the Tate's Cairn Tunnel, begun in July 1988, was also granted to Gammon Construction and Nishimatsu's joint venture, the Tate's Cairn Tunnel Company (TCTC), who also won the concession of the tunnel for 30 years. Nishimatsu built the tunnel and the two ventilation buildings, while Gammon constructed the approach roads and buildings. The tunnel boring was completed in August 1989. Technical difficulties encountered doubled the final cost of construction ($2.15 billion).

The tunnel opened to traffic at 8:00 pm on 26 June 1991. With an initial toll of HK$4, the tunnel was used by 39,000 vehicles in its first 21 hours of operation, and traffic in the Lion Rock Tunnel dropped 20 per cent during the Tate's Cairn Tunnel's first day of operation. The tunnel was formally inaugurated by Governor David Wilson on 1 July that year.

The original radio re-broadcasting systems of the tunnel was replaced in September 2001, to enhance the radio signals so that motorists could listen more clearly to the broadcasts from various channels.

Over the years, the tunnel's rising prices drove trucks to prefer the Lion Rock Tunnel route (where tolls remained fixed), leading to a loss of market share on motorized traffic in the area. In November 2023, the HKeToll system (electronic toll collection service) was installed in the tunnel.

== Franchise model ==
The Tate's Cairn Tunnel is a BOT (build, operate, transfer) infrastructure project funded 100% by the private sector. The BOT franchise was awarded to the Tate's Cairn Tunnel Company Limited for a period of 30 years by the Hong Kong Government in 1988.

Under the terms of the BOT, the franchisee is responsible for the construction and operation of the tunnel until the end of the franchise period. During the franchise period, the company was allowed to earn a reasonable but not excessive return through the collection of tolls. The statutory requirements to the company were defined by the Tate's Cairn Tunnel Ordinance. Upon the expiration of franchise at midnight of 11 July 2018, the tunnel is now transferred to the government.

== Tunnel tolls ==
Tolls are collected manually or electronically in both directions at the toll plaza on the Sha Tin side.

Category	Vehicle	Toll (Note: As of 22 January 2016)
1	Motorcycle	$15
2	Private car	$20
2	Taxi	$20
3	Public light bus	$23
3	Private light bus	$24
4	Light goods vehicle (less than 5.5 tonnes)	$24
5	Medium goods vehicle (5.5 to 24 tonnes)	$28
6	Heavy goods vehicle (more than 24 tonnes)	$28
7	Single-decker bus	$32
8	Double-decker bus	$35
9	Additional axle	$24

== Tunnel facilities ==
- dual-tube, 4-laned
- 9 manual toll booths and 5 autotoll booth
- 24 cross passages
- 160 fire alarms
- 156 emergency telephones
- 320 fire extinguishers
- 82 hose reels
- 78 hydrants
- 18,268 fluorescent tubes
- 3,277 tunnel wall panels
- 44 CCTVs inside tunnel tubes
- 10 CCTVs outside tunnel tubes
- 16 ventilation fans

== Notes ==
Preceded by Kwun Tong Bypass	Hong Kong Route 2 Tate's Cairn Tunnel	Succeeded by Tate's Cairn Highway
