= Shek Lung Tsai New Village =

Village in Sai Kung District, Hong Kong

Coordinates: 22.387399°N 114.260945°E

Shek Lung Tsai New Village (Chinese: 石壟仔新村) is a village in Sai Kung District, Hong Kong.

== Administration ==
Shek Lung Tsai New Village is a recognized village under the New Territories Small House Policy.

== See also ==
- Shek Lung Tsai
