= Sha Tin Wai Road =

Road in Hong Kong

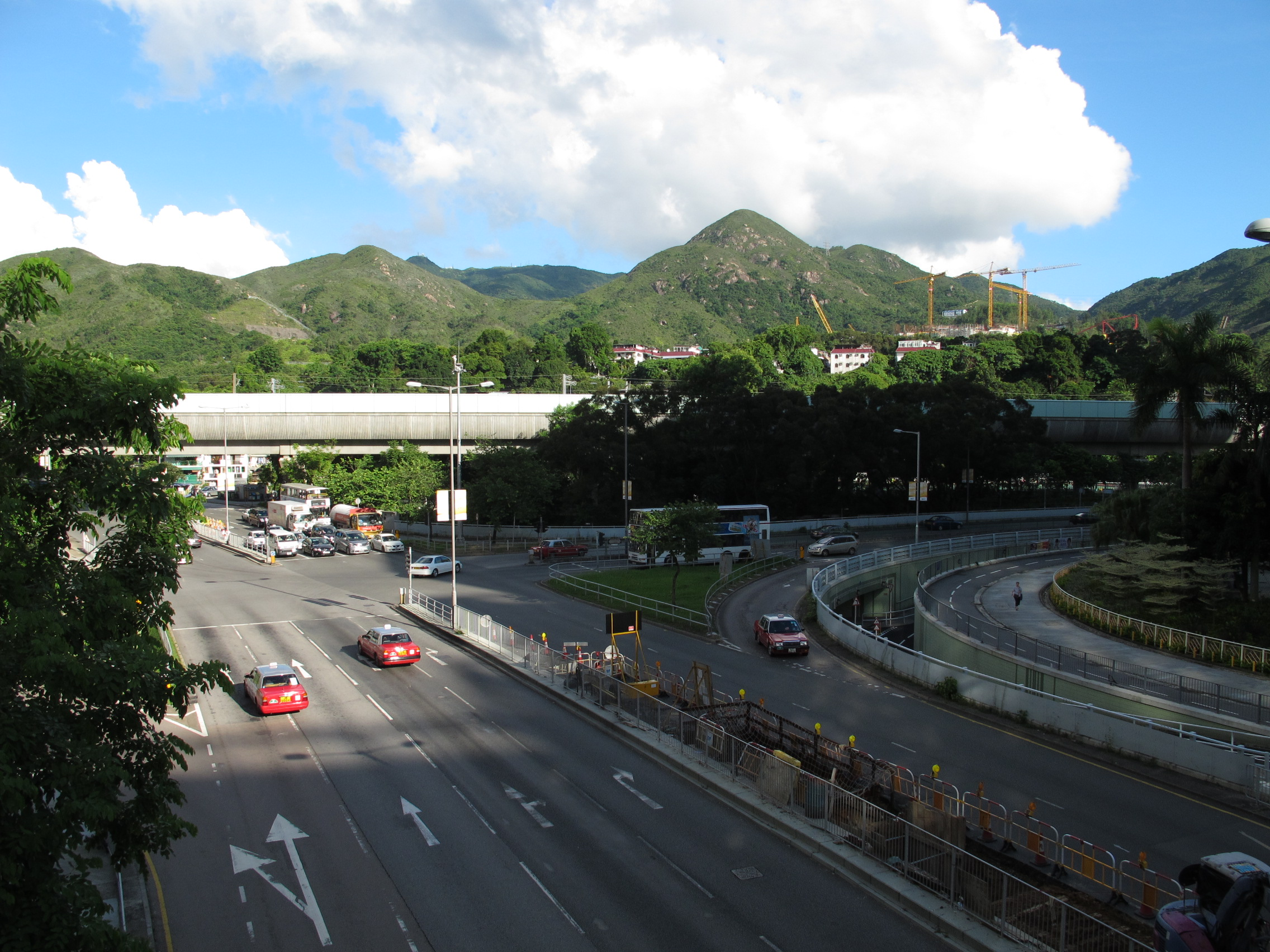
Sha Tin Wai Road in July 2012

Sha Tin Wai Road (Chinese: 沙田圍路) is a road in Sha Tin District, New Territories, Hong Kong. It runs 1.4 kilometres (0.87 mi) from Tai Chung Kiu Road and Sha Tin Rural Committee Road in Sha Tin Wai to Siu Lek Yuen Road and Tate's Cairn Highway in Siu Lek Yuen.

== See also ==
- List of streets and roads in Hong Kong
