= Sha Tin District =

District in New Territories, Hong Kong

Sha Tin 沙田區 Shatin
- District
- Sha Tin District
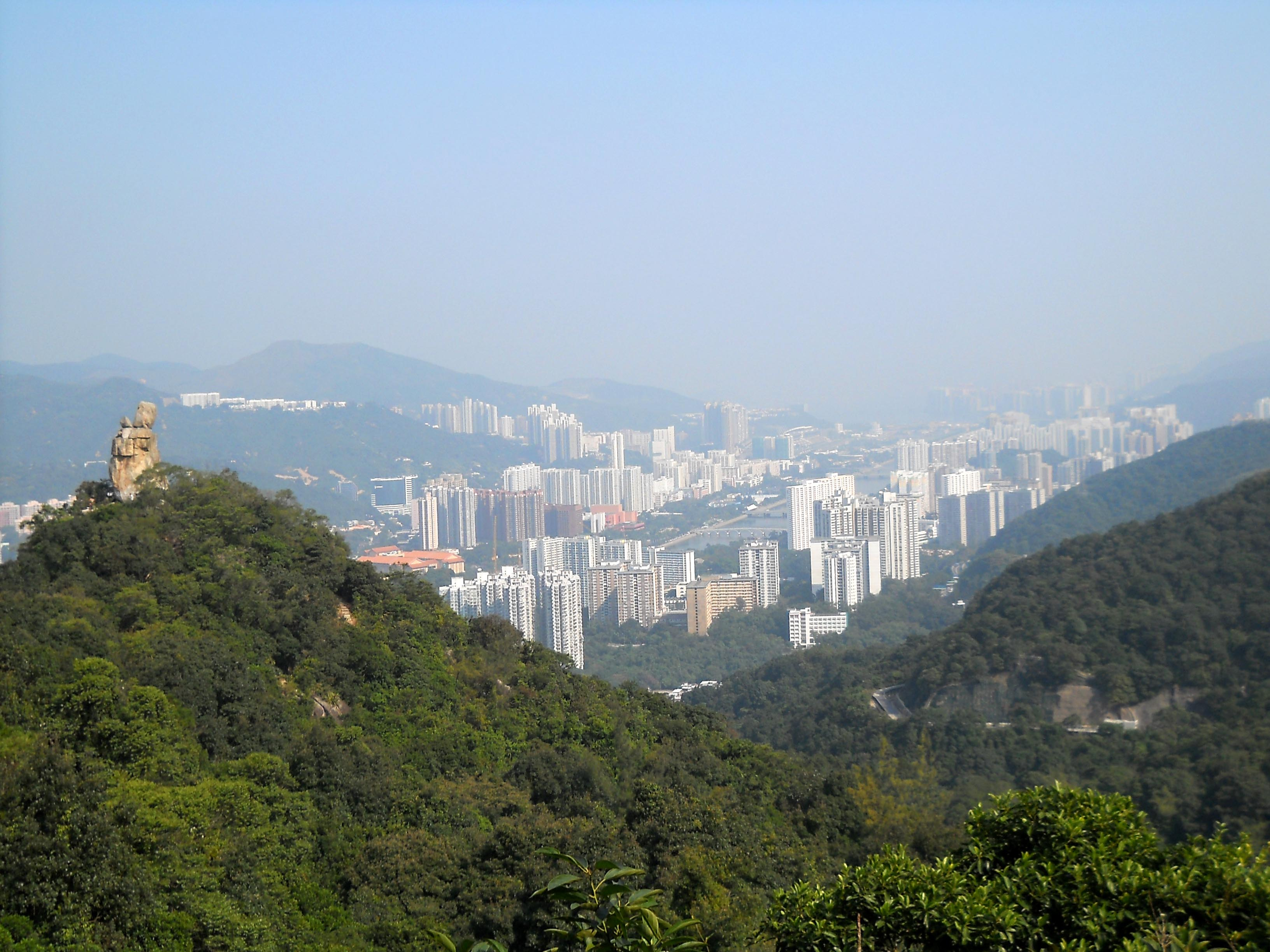
- Day view of the Sha Tin District skyline

- Location of Sha Tin District within Hong Kong
- Coordinates: 22°23′14″N 114°11′43″E
- Country: China
- Region: Hong Kong
- District Council Constituencies: 41

Government
  - District Council Chairman: Chris Mak
  - District Council Vice-Chairman: Sin Cheuk-Nam

Area
  - Total: 69.27 km^{2} (26.75 sq mi)
  - Land: 69.27 km^{2} (26.75 sq mi)
- Lands Department

Population (2021)
  - Total: 692,806
  - Density: 10,082/km^{2} (26,110/sq mi)
- Census and Statistics Department
- Time zone: UTC+8 (Hong Kong Time)
- Website: districtcouncils.gov.hk

Sha Tin District
- Traditional Chinese: 沙田區
- Simplified Chinese: 沙田区
- Jyutping: Saa1 tin4 keoi1
- Literal meaning: "sand field district"
Transcriptions
Standard Mandarin
- Hanyu Pinyin: Shātián Qū
Yue: Cantonese
- Yale Romanization: Sātìhn kēui
- Jyutping: Saa1 tin4 keoi1
- IPA: [sa˥.tʰin˩ kʰɵɥ˥]

Sha Tin District is one of the 18 districts of Hong Kong. As one of the 9 districts located in the New Territories, it covers the areas of Sha Tin, Tai Wai, Ma On Shan, Fo Tan, Siu Lek Yuen, Kwun Yam Shan and Ma Liu Shui. The district is the most populous in Hong Kong, with a population of 659,794 as per the 2016 by-census.

The Sha Tin District covers approximately 69.4 km^{2} (26.8 sq. mi), including Sha Tin New Town and several country parks. Built mostly on reclaimed land in Sha Tin Hoi, the well-developed Sha Tin New Town comprises mainly residential areas along the banks of the Shing Mun River Channel. In the early 1970s it was a rural township of about 30,000 people. After Sha Tin's first public housing estate, Lek Yuen Estate, was completed in 1976, the settlement began to expand. Today, about 65% of the district's population live in public rental housing, housing under Hong Kong's Tenants Purchase Scheme, or Home Ownership Scheme.

== History ==
=== Pre-colonial Era ===
According to archeological discoveries, there were inhabitants settled in the region around four thousand years ago. Sha Tin was formerly named Lek Yuen, literally meaning the "source of trickling" or "source of clear water". The area of the present day Sha Tin was populated before the Ming Dynasty. As the Shing Mun River runs across the district, most local residents were farmers and relied on agriculture for living. In 1579, Tai Wai Village, the oldest and largest walled village in the district was built. Several other villages were built along the river after Tai Wai Village.

=== Colonial Era ===
Sha Tin started to be administered by the British Hong Kong government after the Convention for the Extension of Hong Kong Territory was signed. The establishment of the Sha Tin station of the Kowloon-Canton Railway (British Section) in 1910 caused Sha Tin to be the more common name for the area, replacing Lek Yuen ever since.

Sha Tin was a former market town at the present location of Sha Tin Centre Street and New Town Plaza shopping centre.

Sha Tin Town was the second batch of satellite towns, or new towns, to be built in the New Territories, on land reclaimed from the sea.

== Land use ==
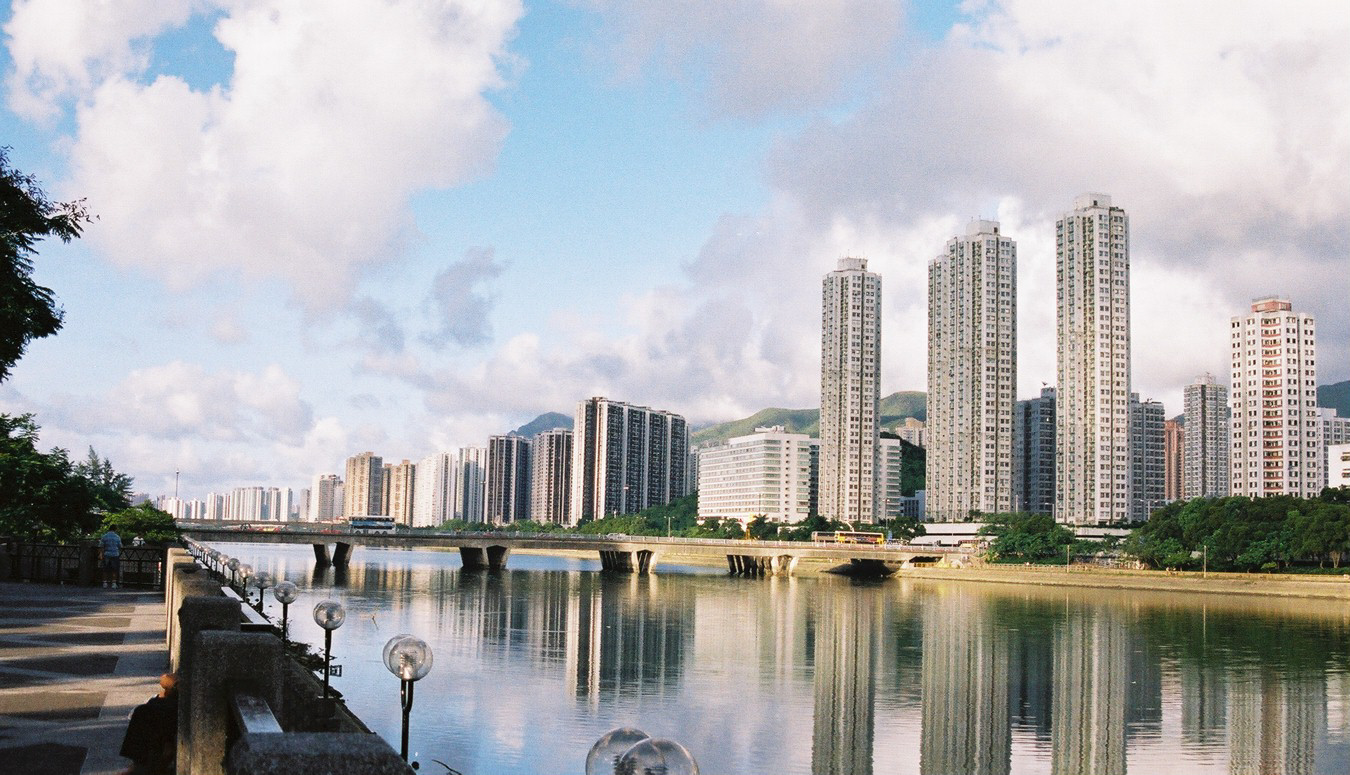
Sha Tin and Shing Mun River

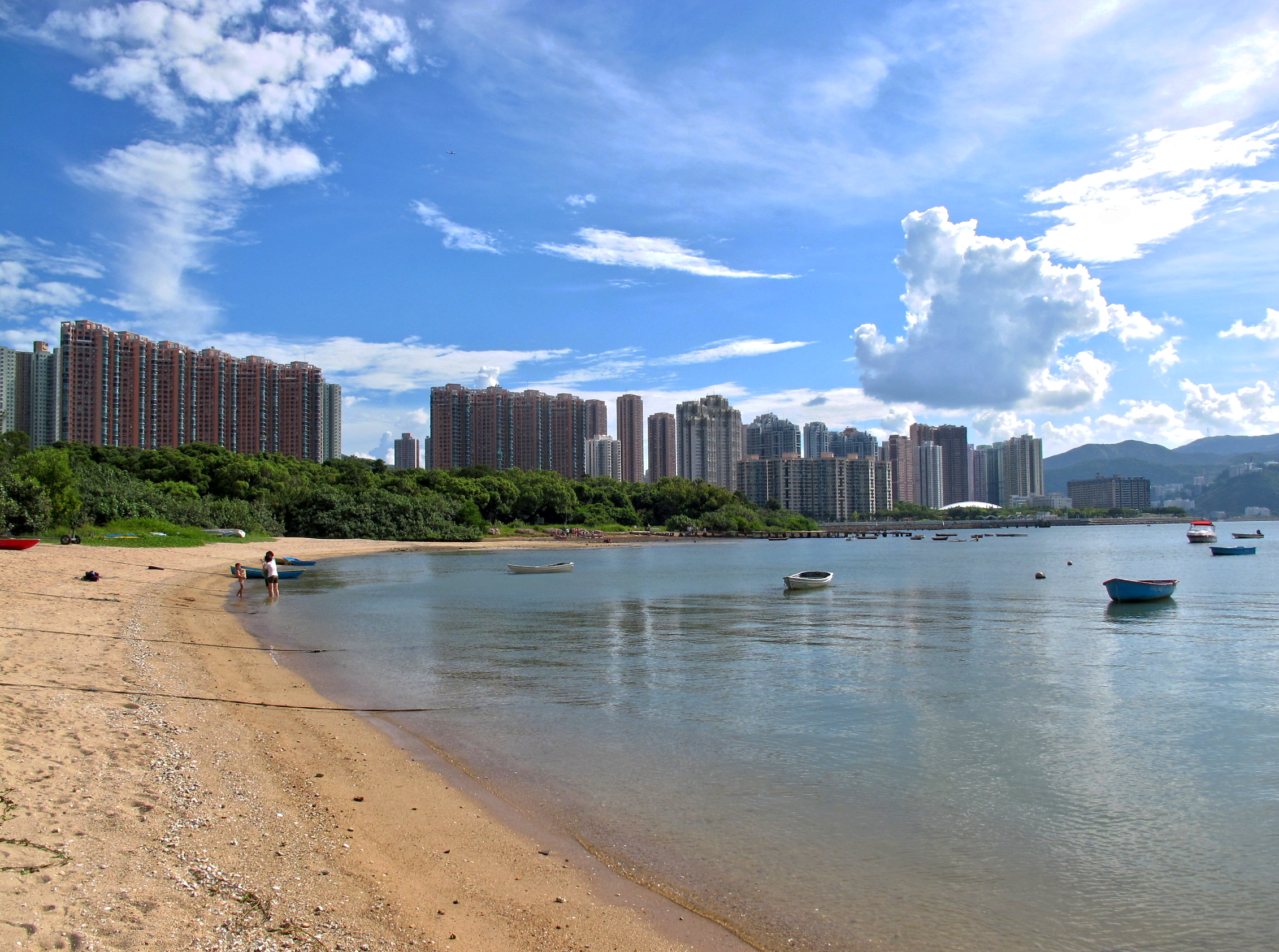
Wu Kai Sha

In addition to the residential areas, there are four industrial areas for light industries: Tai Wai, Fo Tan, Siu Lek Yuen and Shek Mun.

The Chinese University of Hong Kong is also located in Sha Tin. People typically travel there via the MTR East Rail line and get off at University station. A minibus service operates on campus.

Sha Tin is the location for Hong Kong's second equestrian racecourse (the first and most famous being Happy Valley Racecourse) which has a capacity of 85,000. This course hosted the equestrian events during the 2008 Summer Olympics. The Olympics were hosted by Beijing, but there was concern over proper quarantine and disease monitoring in the Chinese capital.

Penfold Park is located inside the racecourse and closed on race days. It is best accessed via the Fo Tan station. Sha Tin Park is another major park located in Sha Tin.

== Shing Mun River ==
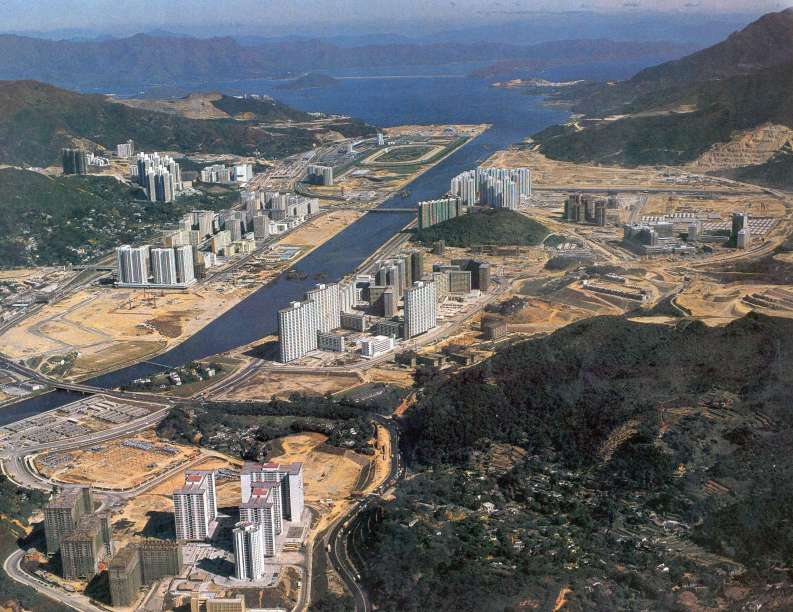
Residential, commercial and industrial buildings with numerous village type developments has been built along the two sides of the Shing Mun River since the early stage of development of Shatin.

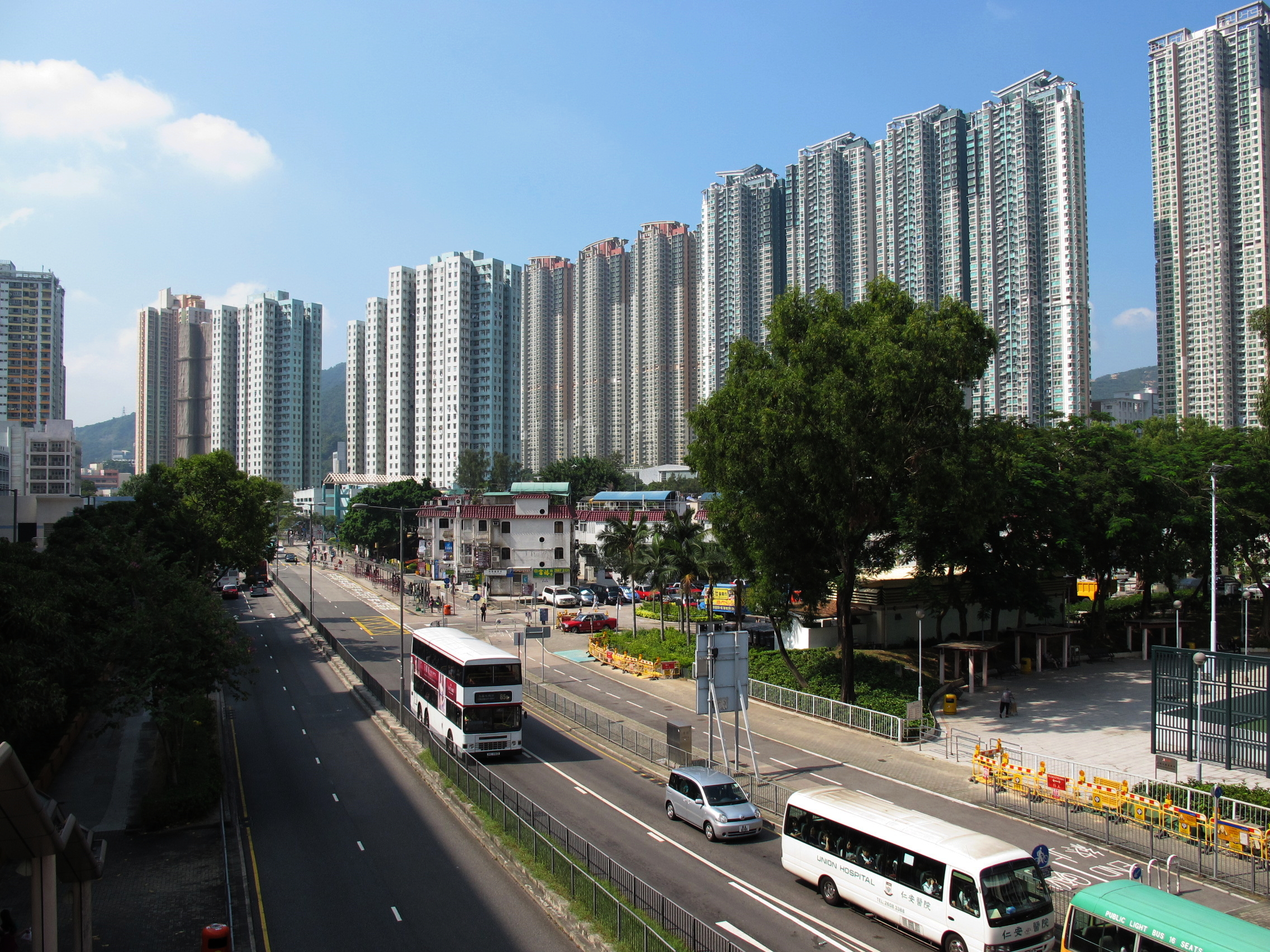
Tin Sam Street in Tai Wai

The Shing Mun River is a 7 km long, 200m wide channel originating at the Shing Mun Reservoir (Tai Mo Shan catchment) that runs as a river from the Tai Wai area, through the Sha Tin town centre to Tide Cove. It has three main tributaries, namely Tai Wai Nullah, Fo Tan Nullah and Siu Lek Yuen Nullah. Along the Shing Mun River are high-rise residential, commercial and industrial buildings with numerous village type developments scattered around.

== Transportation ==
=== Railways ===
Sha Tin District is served by a total of fourteen rapid transit stations on two lines of the MTR railway network, the most of any district in Hong Kong. Five of these stations lie on the East Rail line, namely Tai Wai, Sha Tin, Fo Tan, Racecourse and University. Although all except Racecourse station (which only has service on race days) lie on the original Kowloon–Canton Railway, the oldest in the territory, only Sha Tin station existed at the time the line was inaugurated in 1910, providing direct service to Hung Hom station in Kowloon in the south and the mainland border crossings at Lo Wu and Lok Ma Chau in the north. The other four stations were added later, mostly during the electrification of the line in the 1980s, as a result of the development of the Chinese University, Sha Tin Racecourse, and Sha Tin New Town.

The Ma On Shan line, a branch of the East Rail line, began service in December 2004, serving the eastern parts of Sha Tin and the Ma On Shan area. Its nine stations, running between Tai Wai and Wu Kai Sha, were all located within Sha Tin District, and served newly built housing estates along the route. The only interchange between this line and the rest of the network was at Tai Wai, leading to extreme congestion on the East Rail line between this station and Kowloon Tong, which has a connection to the Kwun Tong line. Both this line and the East Rail line were operated by the Kowloon-Canton Railway Corporation until they were absorbed by the MTR Corporation in 2007.

Railway connectivity to and from Sha Tin District is expected to be significantly improved following the completion of the Sha Tin to Central Link, which will see extensions to both the East Rail and Ma On Shan lines. The first section, known as Tuen Ma line Phase 1, opened in January 2020, extending the Ma On Shan line to Kai Tak via Diamond Hill, and includes a further station serving Hin Keng at the southern end of Sha Tin District. This is expected to relieve congestion on the East Rail line between Tai Wai and Kowloon Tong. By the end of 2021, the full Tuen Ma line would open with a new route through Kowloon City, merging with the West Rail line at Hung Hom and continuing to the northwestern New Territories via western Kowloon. Finally, in 2022, the East Rail line would be extended across Victoria Harbour and terminate at Admiralty station, providing a direct service to Hong Kong Island for the first time.

=== Buses ===
A total of 110 franchised bus routes serve various points in Sha Tin District. These are predominantly operated by Kowloon Motor Bus, which has a depot in Siu Lek Yuen. They include a combination of routes entirely within the district, routes connecting the district to other parts of the New Territories and Kowloon, and several cross-harbour routes to Hong Kong Island, including one as far as Aberdeen. Furthermore, Long Win Bus operates several routes to Lantau Island, the airport, and the Hong Kong–Zhuhai–Macau Bridge, while New World First Bus has express bus service to eastern Hong Kong Island and Tseung Kwan O.

The district is also served by various public light bus routes.

=== Roads ===
Sha Tin District is served by an extensive road network. Four trunk routes on Hong Kong's strategic route network pass through the district:

- Route 1 between Fo Tan and Aberdeen via Kowloon Tong, Hung Hom, and Wan Chai.
- Route 2 between Ma Liu Shui and Quarry Bay via Diamond Hill and Kwun Tong.
- Route 8 between Tai Wai and Hong Kong International Airport via Lai Chi Kok, Tsing Yi, and Lantau Island.
- Route 9 to Tsuen Wan, Tuen Mun, Yuen Long, Fanling, and Tai Po.

These trunk roads make use of several road tunnels leading to the district. Of these, the Lion Rock Tunnel used by Route 1, is the oldest, having opened in 1967 to replace the overcrowded Tai Po Road to Sham Shui Po. Despite the opening of further tunnels over the years, it remains the most direct route to central Kowloon, and thus the most heavily travelled. The Lion Rock Tunnel was followed by the Shing Mun Tunnels on Route 9 in 1990, the Tate's Cairn Tunnel on Route 2 in 1991, and most recently the Tsing Sha Highway on Route 8 (consisting of the Eagle's Nest Tunnel and Sha Tin Heights Tunnel) in 2008.

Other major roads in the area include Sha Lek Highway linking central Sha Tin to Ma On Shan, Sha Tin Road linking eastern Sha Tin to Fo Tan, Tate's Cairn Highway linking eastern Sha Tin to Ma Liu Shui, Tolo Highway linking Sha Tin to the northern districts, and Sai Sha Road linking Ma On Shan to Sai Kung.

A network of cycle tracks throughout Sha Tin measures about 50 km long and is the longest cycle track network in Hong Kong.

== Education ==
=== Secondary schools ===
Schools with Wikipedia articles:

- Baptist Lui Ming Choi Secondary School
- Hong Kong Baptist University Affiliated School Wong Kam Fai Secondary and Primary School
- International Christian School of Hong Kong
- Jockey Club Ti-I College
- Kiangsu-Chekiang College (Shatin)
- Li Po Chun United World College
- Helen Liang Memorial Secondary School (Shatin)
- Renaissance College
- S. K. H. Tsang Shiu Tim Secondary School
- Sha Tin College
- Sha Tin Government Secondary School
- Sha Tin Methodist College
- Shatin Pui Ying College
- Shatin Tsung Tsin Secondary School
- Tak Sun Secondary School

=== Higher education ===
- Chinese University of Hong Kong
- Hang Seng University of Hong Kong
- Hong Kong Baptist University (Shek Mun Campus)
- Hong Kong Sports Institute
- Institute of Vocational Education

=== Public libraries ===
Hong Kong Public Libraries has four libraries in the district: Lek Yuen, Ma On Shan, Sha Tin, and Yuen Chau Kok.

== Hospitals ==
There are four hospitals in Sha Tin District:

- Prince of Wales Hospital, one of the centres of the 2003 SARS outbreak among health care workers (Ward 8A);
- Sha Tin Hospital;
- Cheshire Home Shatin; and
- Union Hospital, a private hospital

== Cityscape ==
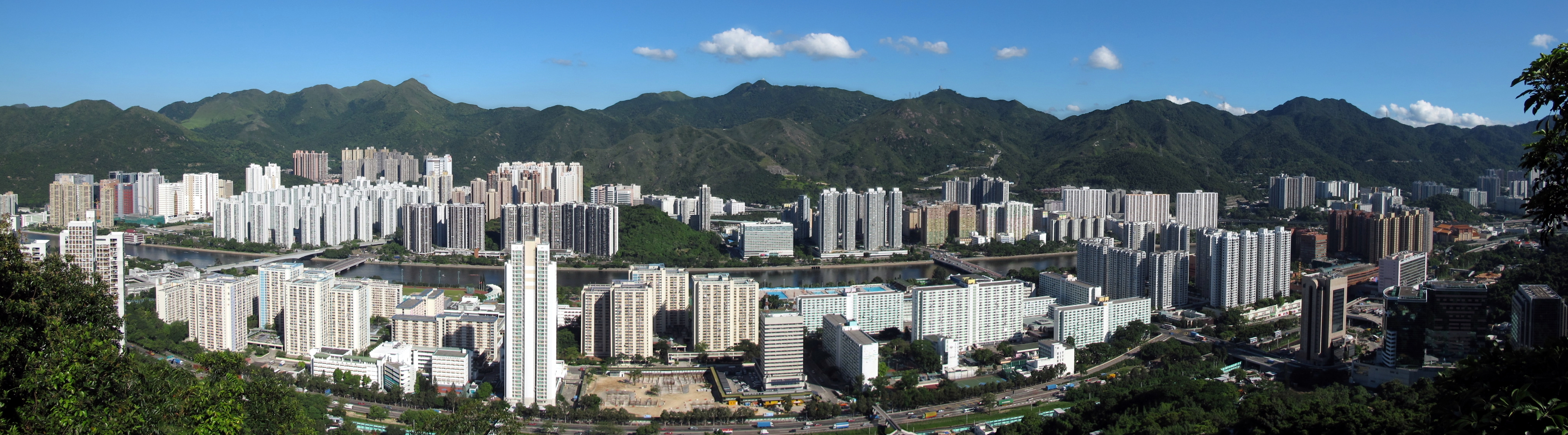
The view looking south from Shatin Lion Pavilion

== Tourist attractions ==
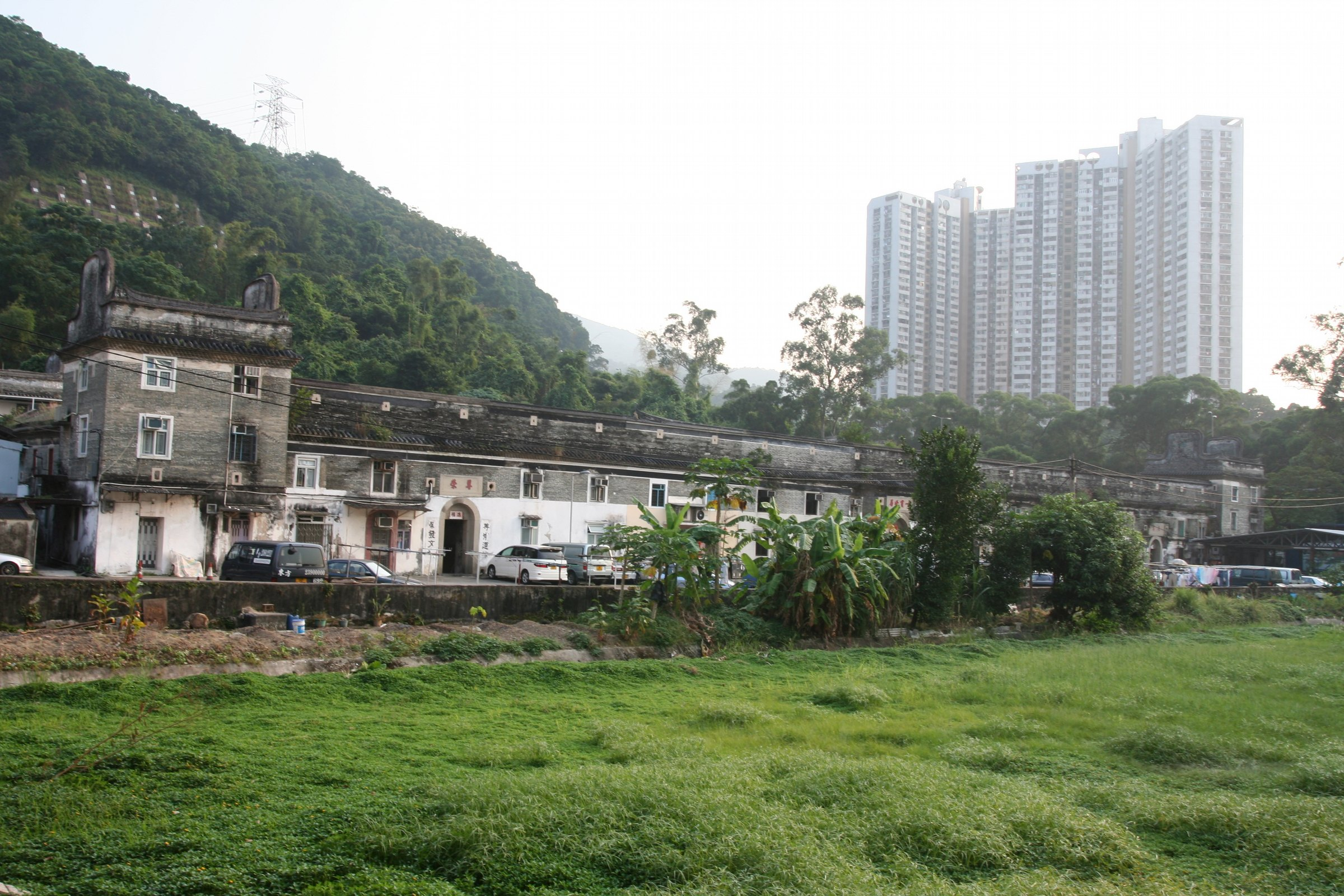
Tsang Tai Uk: external view

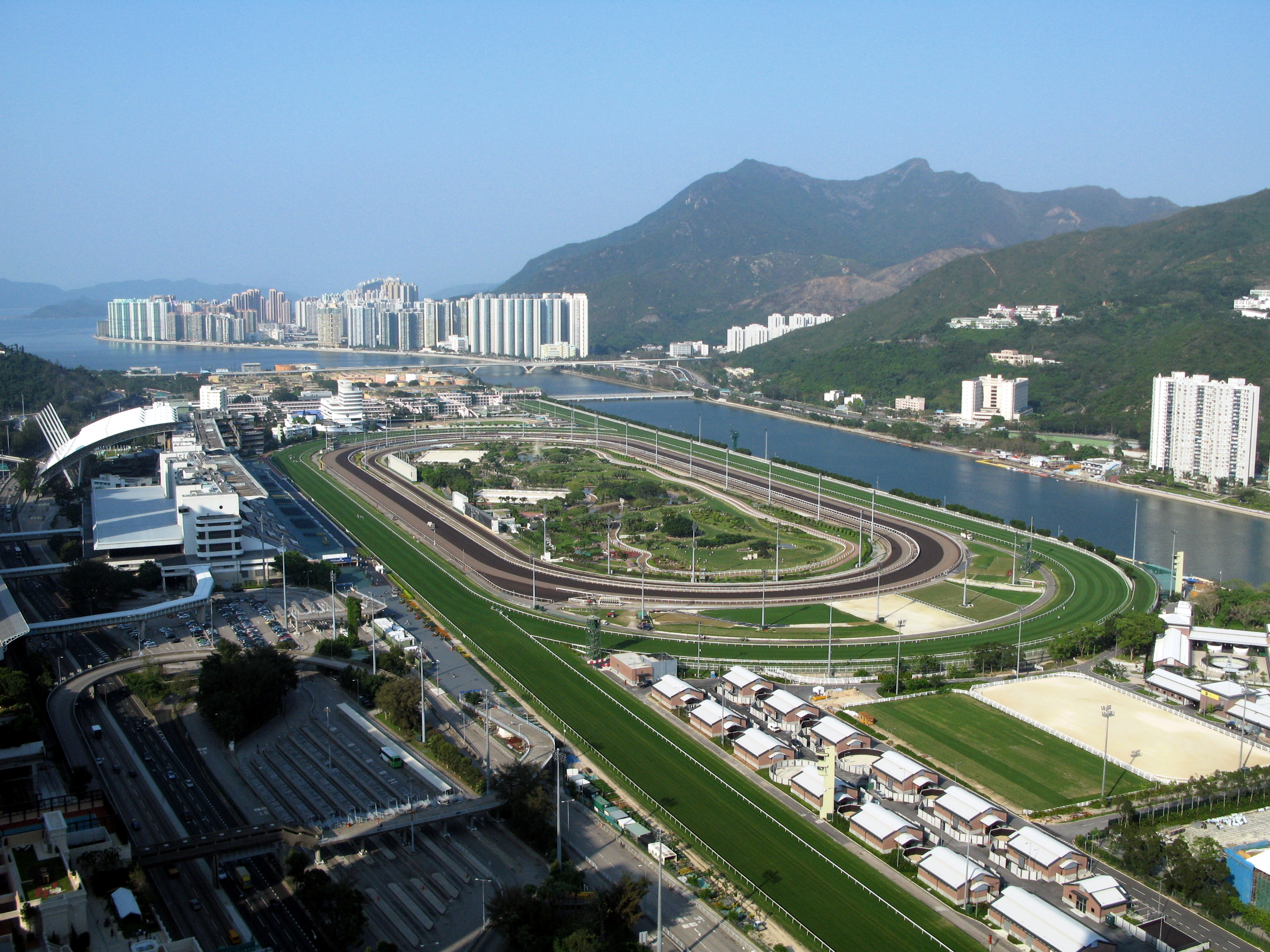
Sha Tin Racecourse

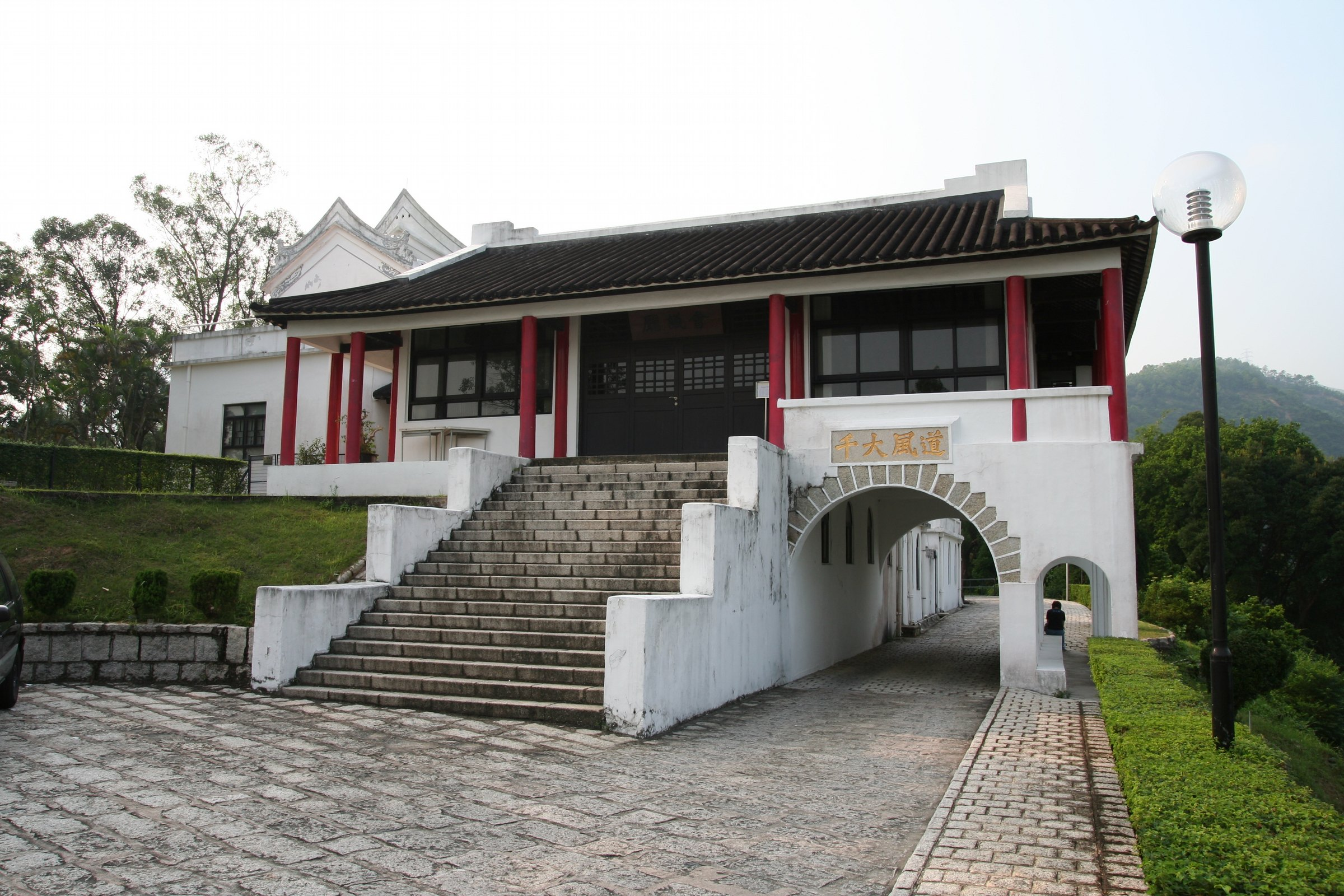
Tao Fong Shan

Local and tourist attractions in the Sha Tin area include, most famously, the Hong Kong Heritage Museum, which is Hong Kong's largest museum. The Museum was opened on 16 December 2000 and includes 12 galleries, a café and museum shop. Other attractions include:

- Sha Tin Racecourse (沙田馬場)– located in Shatin Town, it is one of the two racecourses in Hong Kong.
- Che Kung Miu (車公廟) – thousands of worshippers go to worship during Chinese New Year, including many local government officials.
- Ten Thousand Buddhas Monastery (萬佛寺)
- Tao Fung Shan (道風山)
- Amah Rock (望夫石)
- Tsang Tai Uk (曾大屋) – an 1848 dwelling of granite, timber and green brick, with defence towers and a still-used ancestral hall.
- Lion Pavilion (獅子亭)
- Jockey Club Museum of Climate Change
- New Town Plaza – a large shopping mall in Sha Tin Town.
- Shing Mun River (城門河)
- Lion Rock 獅子山)
- Sha Tin Park – a popular park running alongside the Shing Mun river channel (open daily 0700 – 2245) in Sha Tin Town.
- Penfold Park (彭福公園)
- Sha Tin Town Hall – the premier cultural venue in the eastern New Territories, hosting cultural events and exhibitions.
- Snoopy's World. Six zones of amusements on the third floor of the New Town Plaza, including Snoopy's House, a canoe ride and a museum of Peanuts characters (open daily, 1000–2200).

== See also ==
- List of places in Hong Kong
