= Penfold Park =

Urban park in Hong Kong

Coordinates: 22°23′56″N 114°12′23″E

- 彭福公園
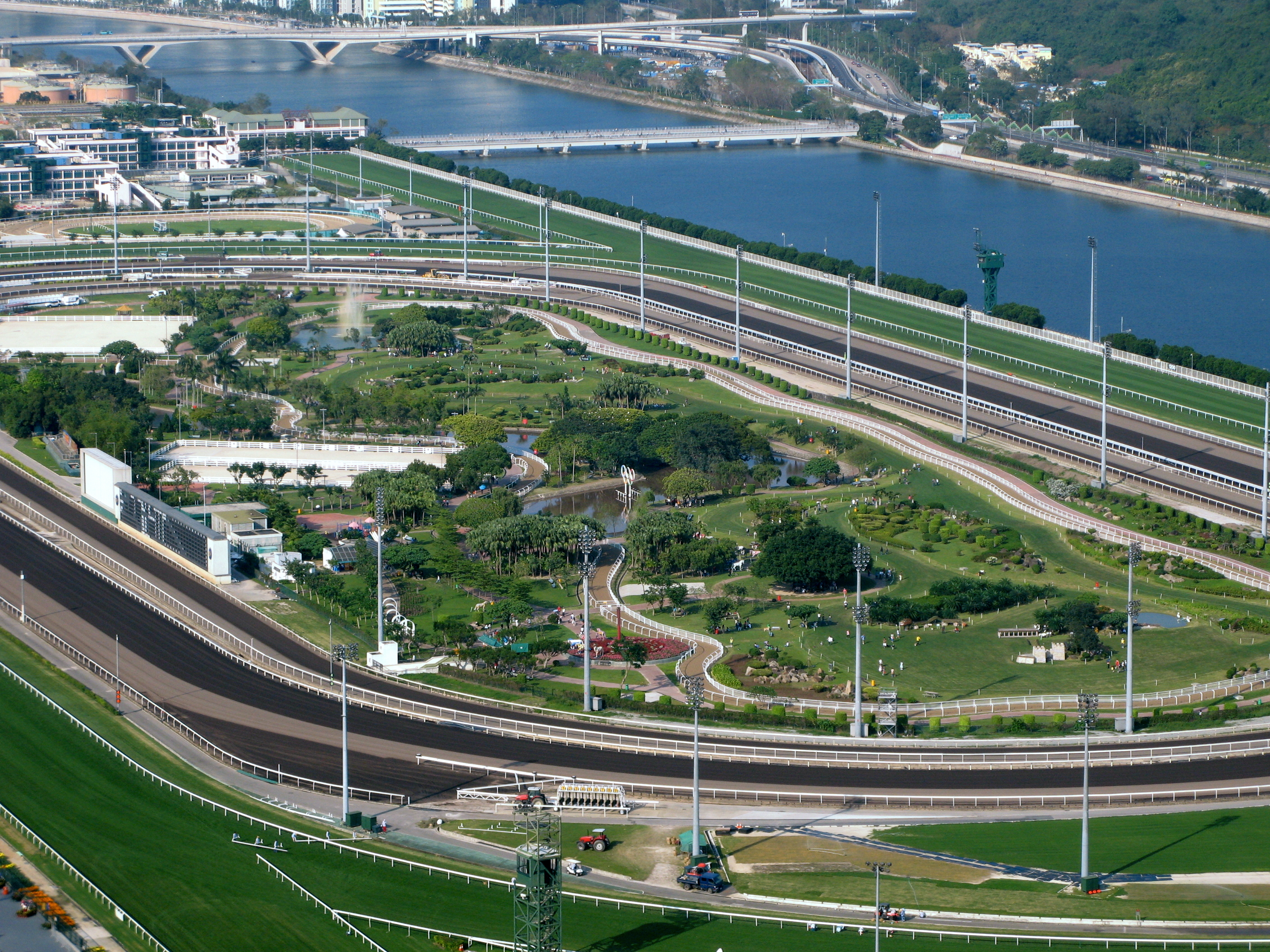
- Aerial view
- Interactive map of Penfold Park
- Location: Sha Tin, Hong Kong
- Area: Approx. 9 hectares
- Opened: 11 May 1979; 47 years ago
- Operator: Hong Kong Jockey Club
- Public transit: Racecourse station (250 m); Fo Tan station (600 m)

Penfold Park (Chinese: 彭福公園) is a public park managed by the Hong Kong Jockey Club in Sha Tin, Hong Kong. It is named after Major-General Bernard Penfold, the first general manager of the Jockey Club who was in office from 1972 to 1979.

The park is located in the centre (within the track) of the Sha Tin Racecourse with a gross area of over 20 acres. It features green areas, as well as pools used by various waterbirds. People around the area often go there to have a walk. There are many painted horse statues and artworks. It is closed during horse racing days and Mondays.

== History ==
The park was briefly called Infield Park at opening on 11 May 1979. The chairman of the Jockey Club Board of Stewards, during the Stewards' annual general meeting on 17 September that year, announced that the park would be named in honour of Major-General Bernard Penfold. The chairman explained that the Stewards "considered the beautifying of the in-field with shrubs and trees to be a characteristic example of General Penfold's many achievements". General Penfold, the manager of the Jockey Club who presided over construction of the park, was slated to retire the following year after seven seasons as general manager.

During the years after SARS, there were a few slight bouts of bird flu, and the man-made lakes had been closed a few times to reduce the chance of visitors contracting the diseases. The Hong Kong Jockey Club had announced that Penfold Park would be closed from the end of July 2007 to April 2008 for the construction of training facilities for the 2008 Olympic equestrian events. On 17 January 2009, the park was reopened for the public.

== Features ==
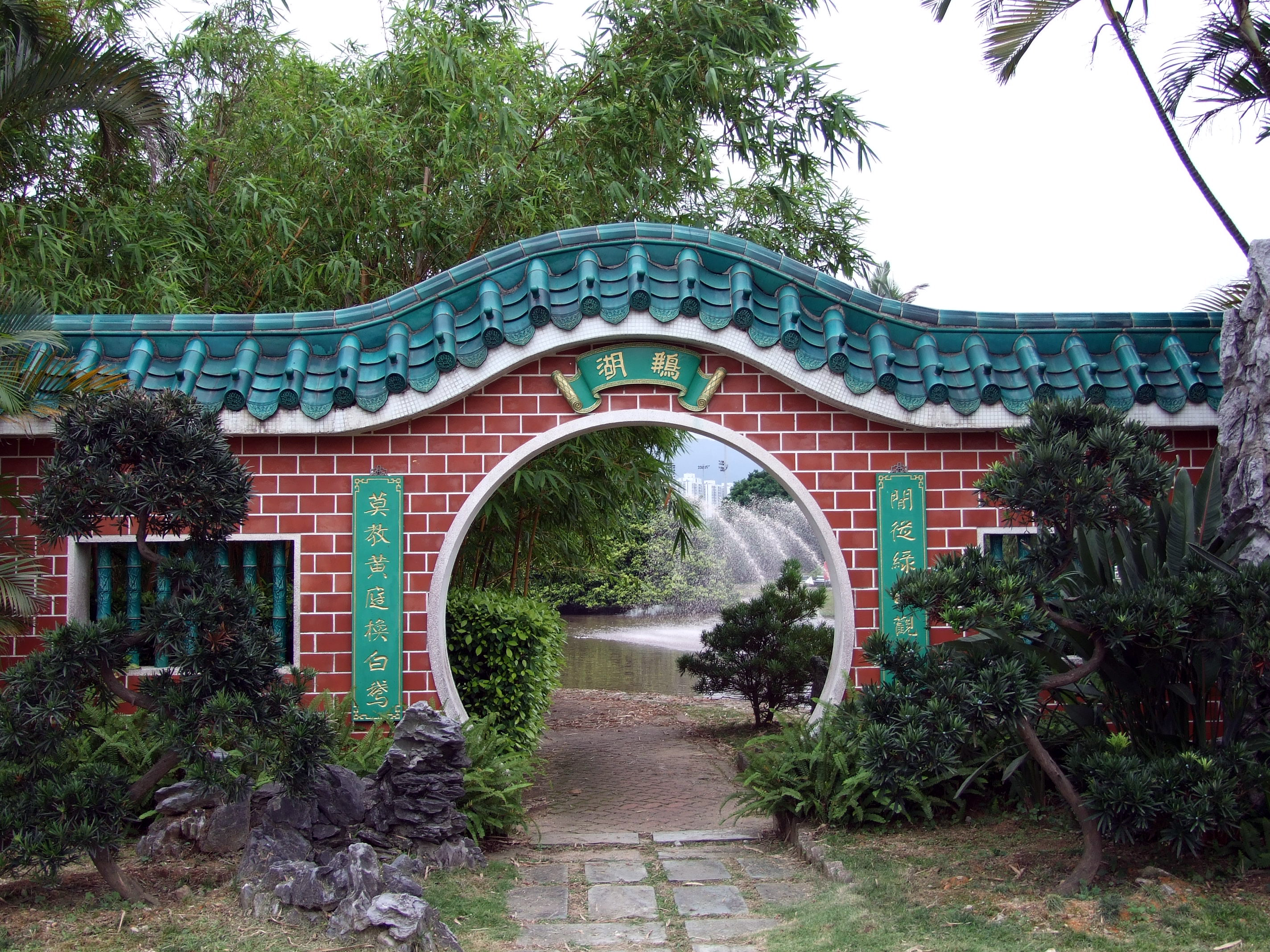
Lake entrance

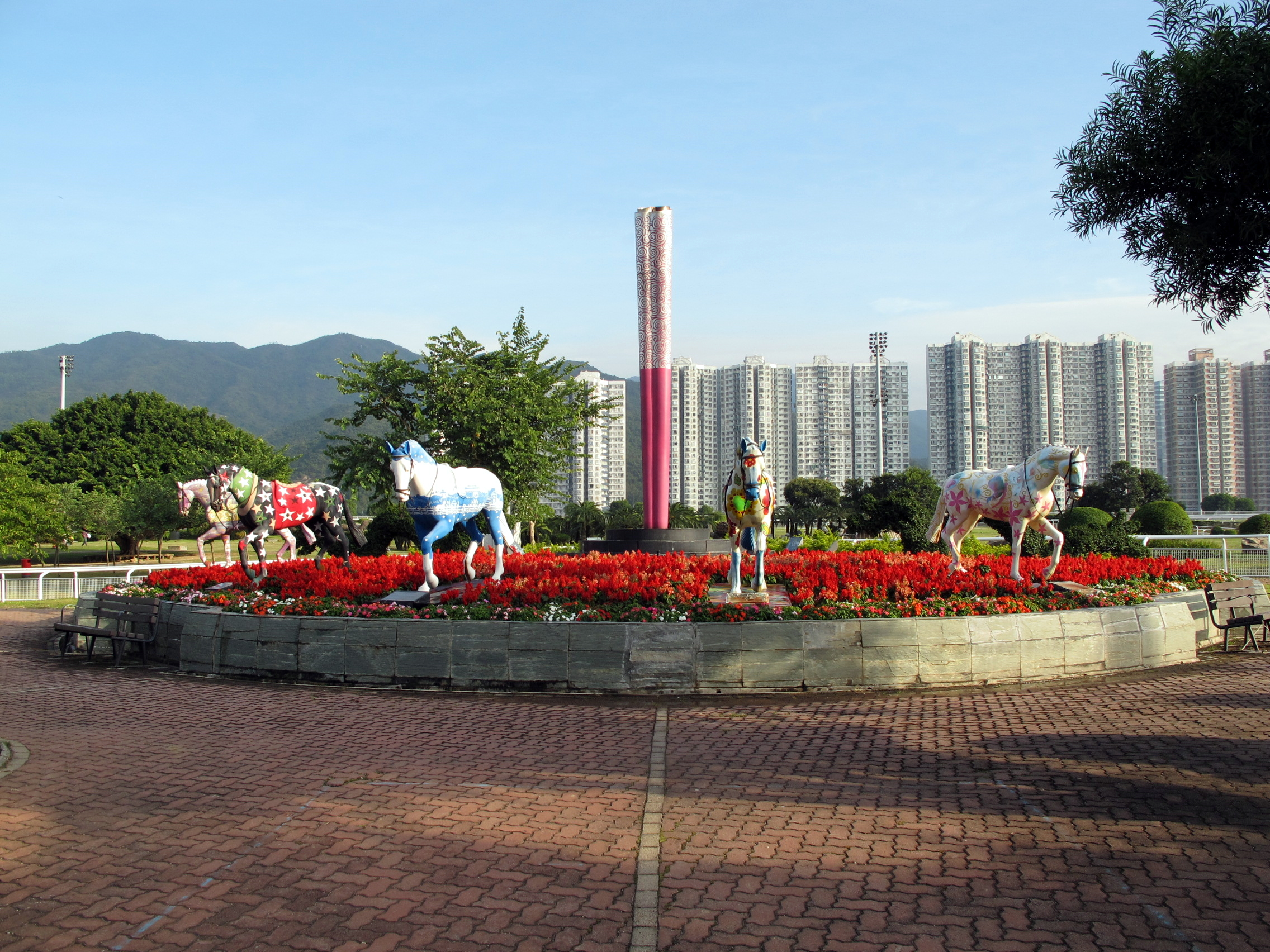
Olympic cauldron

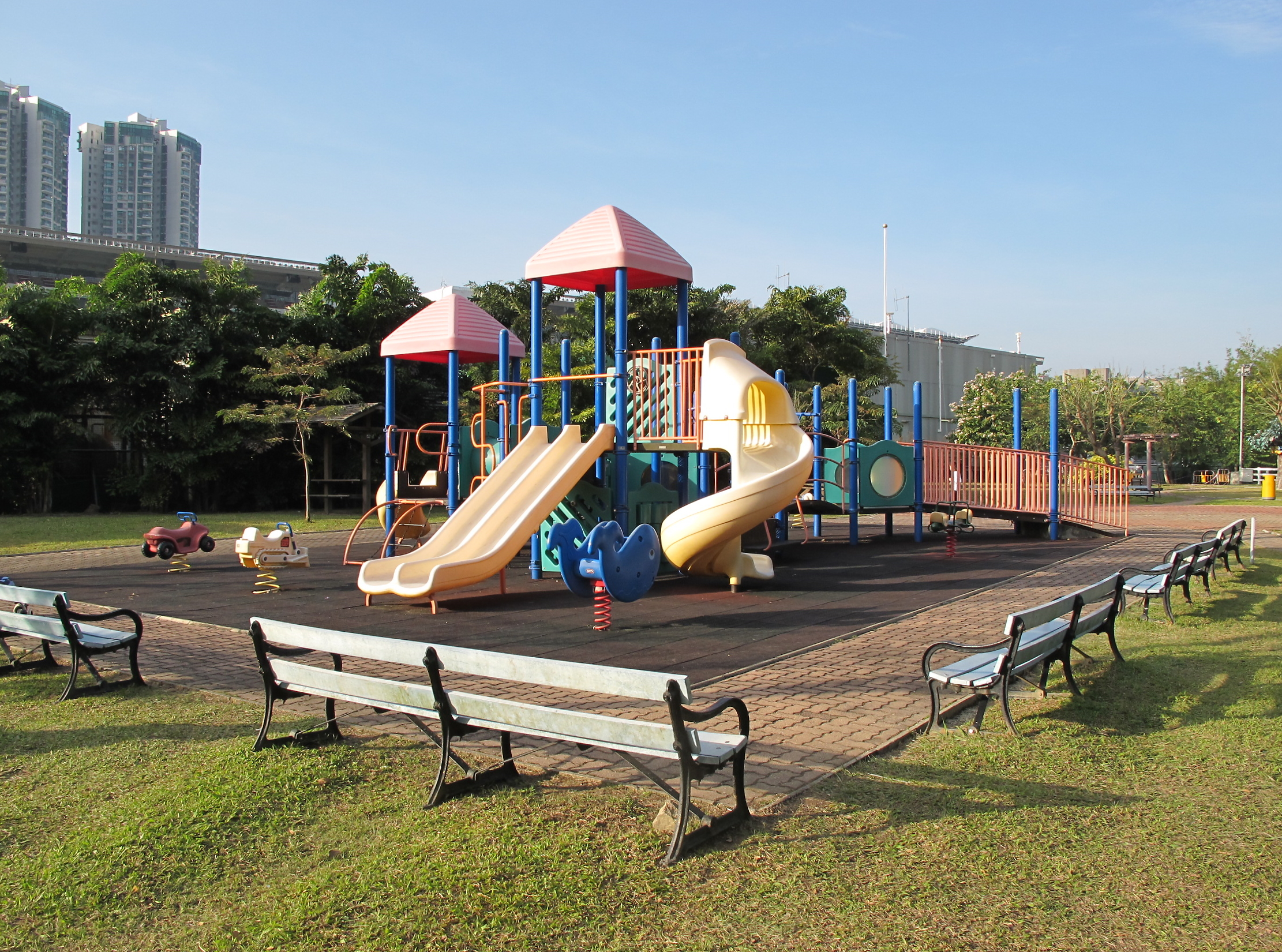
Children Playground

== Opening hours ==
On 22 September 2015, The Hong Kong Jockey Club announced that Penfold Park would be open year-round and with extended opening hours.

	Summer (May - Sep)	Winter (Oct – Apr)
Sha Tin Day Race (normally Sat or Sun)	09:00-11:30	
Sha Tin Night Race (normally Wed)	09:00-17:00	
Non-racedays *except opening at 09.30 on barrier trials (normally Tue & Fri)	09:00*-19:30	09:00*-18:30

== Transportation ==
- East Rail line – Fo Tan station or Racecourse station

== See also ==
- List of urban public parks and gardens of Hong Kong
