= Siu Lek Yuen Nullah =

Watercourse in Shatin, Hong Kong

Coordinates: 22.3873°N 114.2065°E

- Traditional Chinese: 小瀝源渠
- Cantonese Yale: síu lihk yùhn kèuih
Transcriptions
Yue: Cantonese
- Yale Romanization: síu lihk yùhn kèuih
- Jyutping: siu2 lik1 jyun4 keoi4

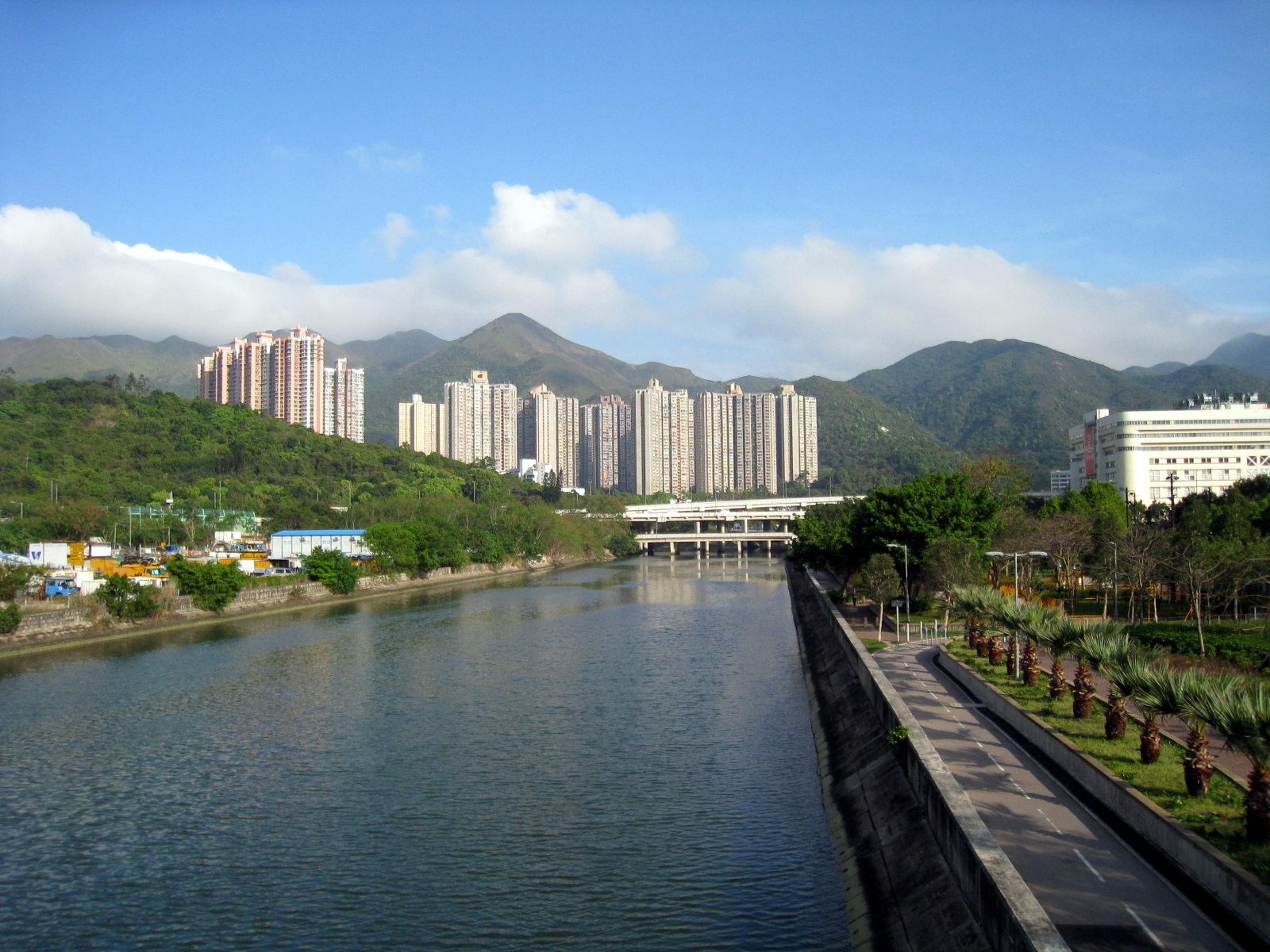
Siu Lek Yuen Nullah in April 2008

The Siu Lek Yuen Nullah (Chinese: 小瀝源渠) is one of the nullahs of the Shing Mun River in Siu Lek Yuen, Hong Kong.

== See also ==
- List of rivers and nullahs in Hong Kong
