= Lion Rock Tunnel =

Road tunnel in Hong Kong

Lion Rock Tunnel 獅子山隧道
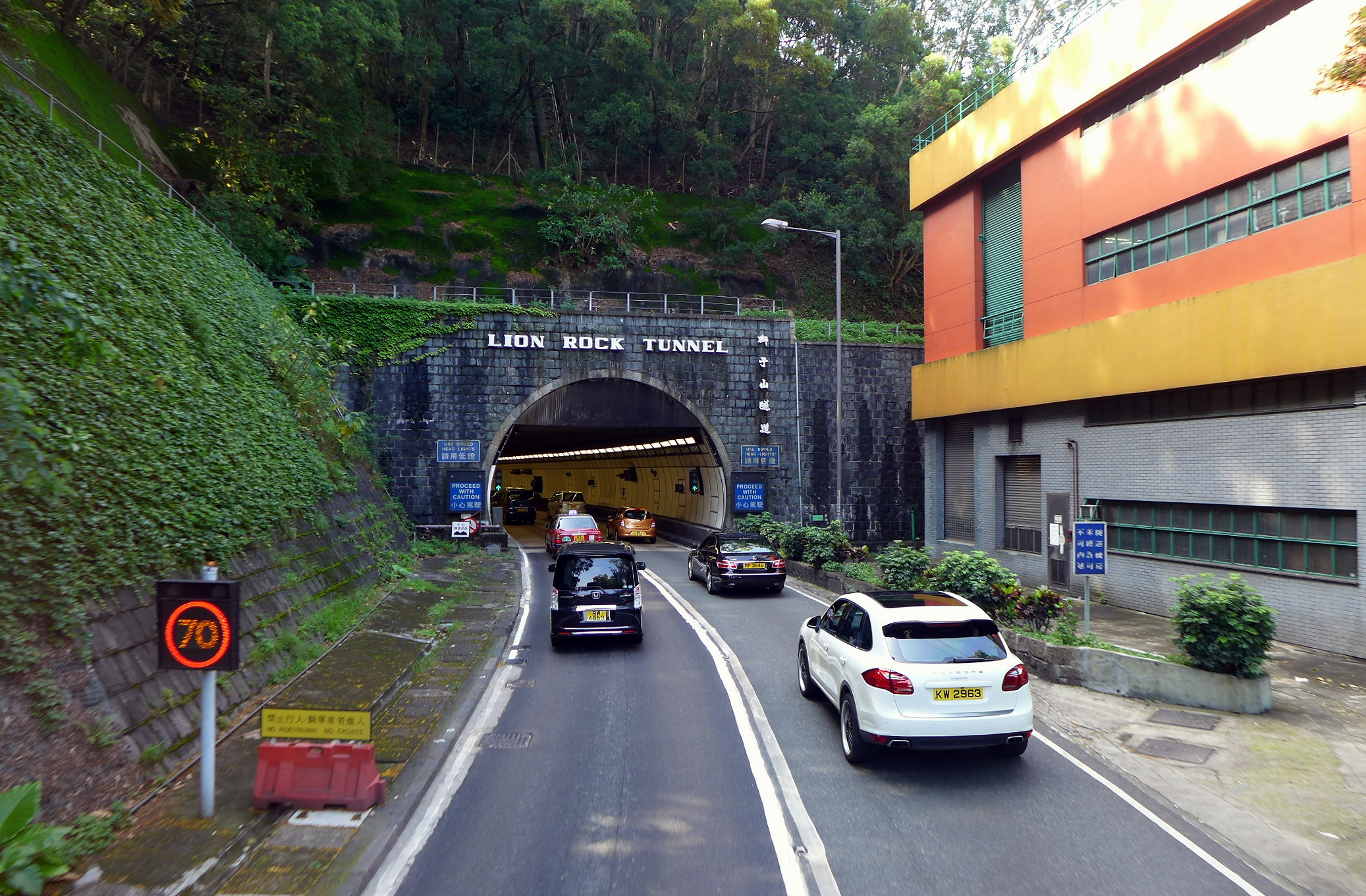
- Entrance of the Lion Rock Tunnel in Sha Tin, Hong Kong
- Interactive map of Lion Rock Tunnel 獅子山隧道

Overview
- Location: Through Lion Rock, connecting Kowloon Tong to Tai Wai in Hong Kong
- Coordinates: 22°21′21″N 114°10′22″E
- Status: Active
- Route: Route 1
- Start: Kowloon Tong
- End: Hin Tin

Operation
- Work began: January 1962; 64 years ago
- Opened: 14 November 1967; 59 years ago (Lion Rock Tunnel); 18 January 1978; 48 years ago (Second Lion Rock Tunnel)
- Owner: Hong Kong Government
- Operator: Greater Lucky (H.K.) Co., Ltd
- Traffic: Vehicular
- Toll: Yes (HK$8)
- Vehicles per day: 90,608

Technical
- Design engineer: Young Au Young
- Length: 1.4 kilometres (0.87 mi)
- No. of lanes: 4 lanes (2 lanes per direction)
- Operating speed: 70 kilometres per hour (43 mph)

Lion Rock Tunnel
- Traditional Chinese: 獅子山隧道
- Simplified Chinese: 狮子山隧道
Transcriptions
Standard Mandarin
- Hanyu Pinyin: Shīzǐshān Suìdào
Yue: Cantonese
- Jyutping: si1 zi2 saan1 seui6 dou6

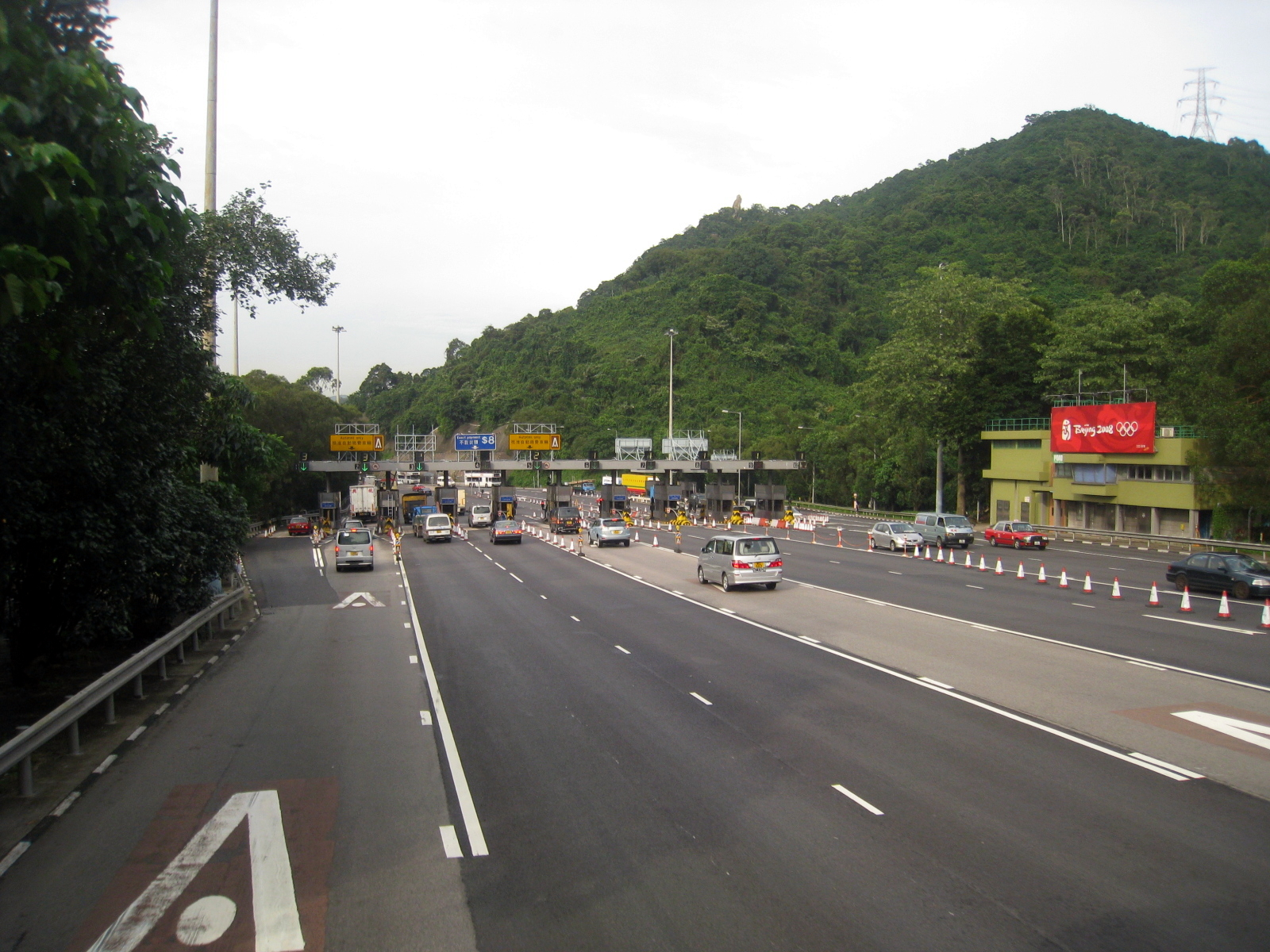
Lion Rock Tunnel former toll plaza, on the Sha Tin side.

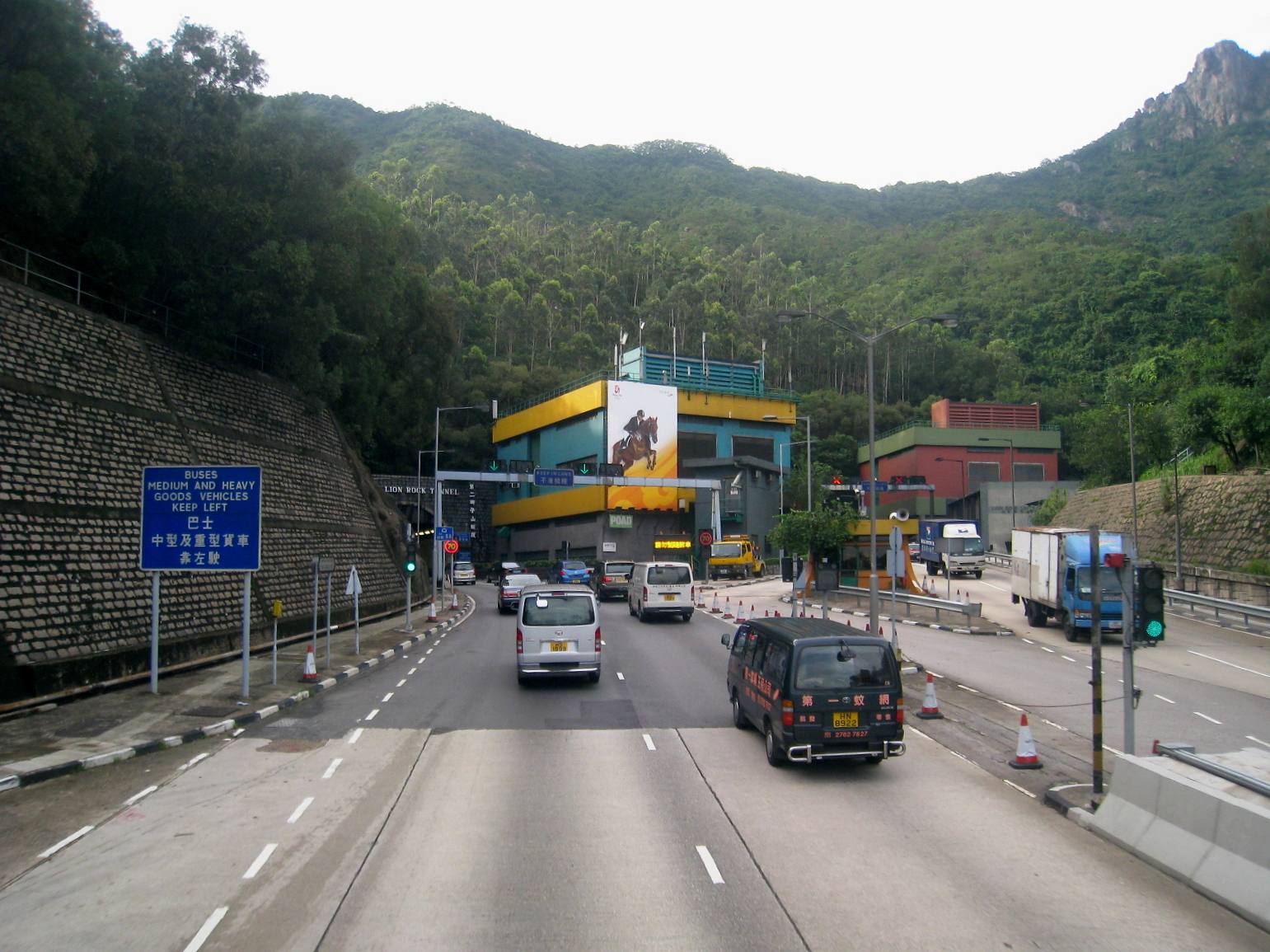
New Kowloon side. The Second Lion Rock Tunnel is on the left, the "old" tunnel is on the right. Lion Rock is visible in the top right corner.

The Lion Rock Tunnel, the first major road tunnel in Hong Kong, is a twin-bored toll tunnel, connecting Hin Tin, Sha Tin in the New Territories and New Kowloon near Kowloon Tong. It has two southbound lanes, and there are two northbound lanes in the Second Lion Rock Tunnel. They are vital components of Route 1.

== History ==
The construction of Lion Rock Tunnel started in January 1962. The tunnel was opened on 14 November 1967, as a 1.43 km dual-one single bore tunnel. This tunnel is often described as a by-product of the Plover Cove Scheme, which was a project to build a water supply tunnel through the range of hills separating New Kowloon and the rest of the New Territories. The tunnel was designed by Young Au Young, a graduate of Lingnan and civil engineer from Shunde.

The government later saw the need for another road link between New Kowloon and Sha Tin when it decided to develop the latter as a new town. The Second Lion Rock Tunnel, which is 1.41 km long and situated to the west of, and lying parallel to, the old tunnel, was opened to traffic on 18 January 1978.

The new tunnel serves northbound traffic towards Sha Tin, while the old one serves southbound traffic towards Kowloon. Traffic in both directions share one of the tunnels when the other undergoes maintenance.

== Management ==
Since 1993, Serco has been contracted to manage, operate and maintain the tunnel, having successfully retained the contract in 1996 and 2000.

The Tunnel has achieved both ISO 9001 and OHASA18001 in 2004. The toll to traverse the Lion Rock Tunnel is HK$8 each way.

On 23 April 2012, Greater Lucky (H.K.) Company Limited successfully bid the contract and took over the management with effect from 1 August 2012.

== Renovation of the tunnel ==
As the facilities within the tubes of Lion Rock Tunnel suffered from serious deterioration due to ageing, as well as broken concrete on the road surface which caused bumping when vehicles pass through, the Highways Department decided to undergo renovation works upon the tunnels in 2008. It will extend the lives of the tunnels for around 80 years more.

However, the renovation may cause even more serious congestion of the tunnels and may change the starting time for one-tube-two-way traffic (using one tube only for both direction of traffic) from 12 am to 9 or 10 pm. The fire-resisting shields on the wall of the tunnels and the ceilings would be renovated, while the words "LION ROCK TUNNEL" and its Chinese counterparts would be retained on the sides of the entrances and exits of the tunnels.

== Current usage ==
With the rapid development of the new towns, the tunnels have already reached its saturation flow just like Cross-Harbour Tunnel. The flow was eased by other tunnels being put into service later, such as Shing Mun Tunnels, Tate's Cairn Tunnel, Tsing Sha Highway. Nonetheless, the convenience of its connection and directness, with a lower fee than the Tate's Cairn Tunnel, Lion Rock Tunnel contributes to the highest daily average vehicles flow of all non-harbour-crossing tunnels. 90,608 vehicles used the tunnels everyday on average in 2014.

== See also ==
- Lion Rock
- Beacon Hill Tunnel, the first rail tunnel in Hong Kong, opened in 1910
- Transport in Hong Kong

Preceded by Waterloo Road	Hong Kong Route 1 Lion Rock Tunnel	Succeeded by Lion Rock Tunnel Road
