= Siu Lek Yuen =

Coordinates: 22.3823°N 114.2183°E

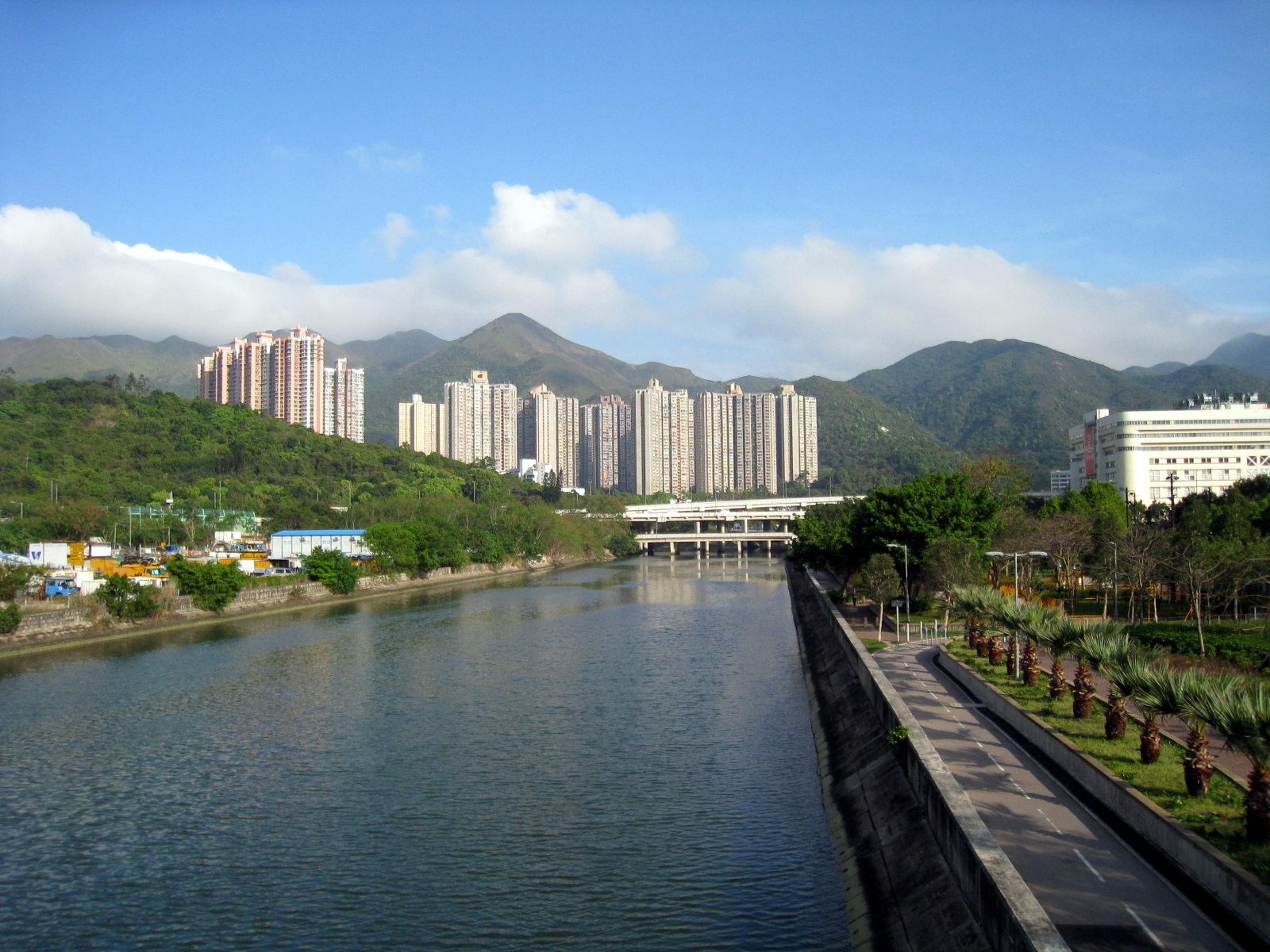
Siu Lek Yuen Nullah with Kwong Yuen Estate in the background in April 2008.

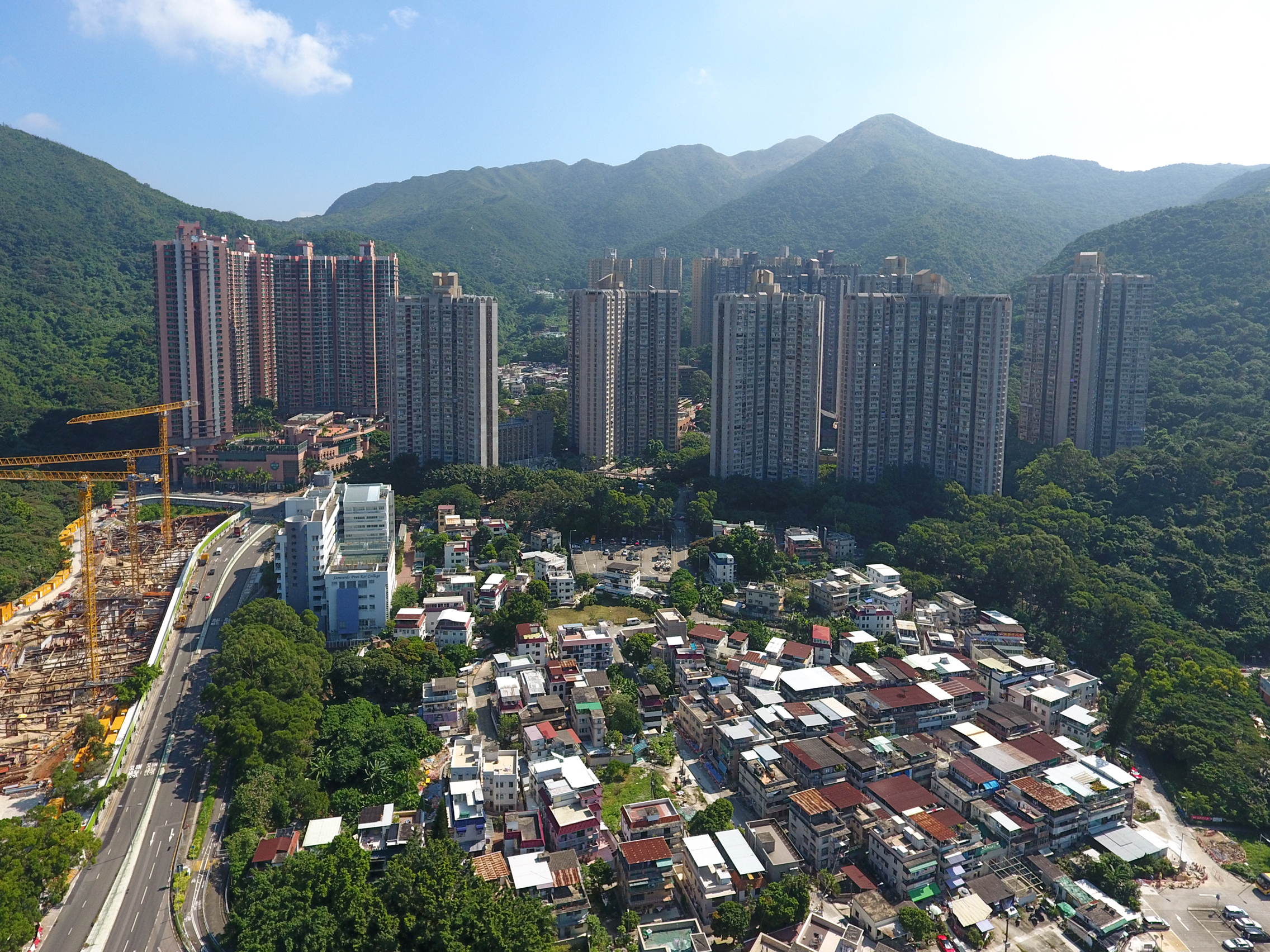
Siu Lek Yuen in November 2016

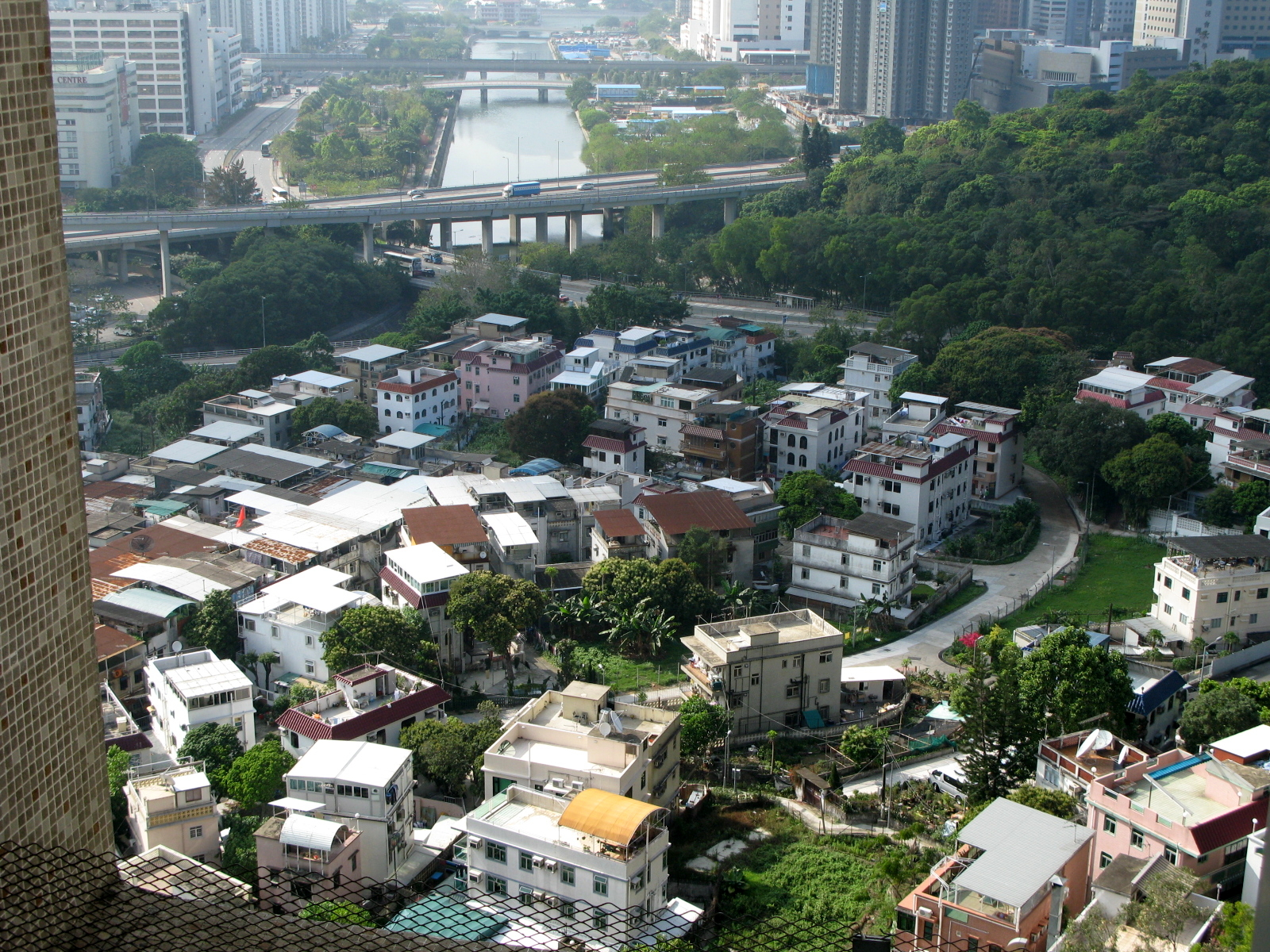
Siu Lek Yuen Village.

Siu Lek Yuen (Chinese: 小瀝源) is an area in Sha Tin District, New Territories East. Located to the east of Yuen Chau Kok, the area is surrounded on three sides by the Ma On Shan Country Park. Nowadays it is a residential area.

== Name ==
The name means the origin of small river in Chinese. It is so named because the area situated originally between two rivers.

== Geography ==
Siu Lek Yuen lies at a hill that locates at the east side of Shing Mun River. Therefore, unlike most of the Sha Tin New Town, the land does not come from reclamation.

== History ==
Siu Lek Yuen was originally a ford of Tide Cove (沙田海), which was reclaimed for the development of Sha Tin New Town. At a result, only Siu Lek Yuen Nullah (小瀝源渠), a small nullah of the Shing Mun River remained. As part of the New Town, Siu Lek Yuen also underwent a vast change in the years. Originally it was one of the nine districts of Sha Tin (沙田九約), namely, Siu Lek Yuen District (小瀝源約), where 14 Hakka villages were there. After the development of Sha Tin New Town, public and private housing estates and factories were built here.

Siu Lek Yuen Village is a recognized village under the New Territories Small House Policy. At the time of the 1911 census, the population of Siu Lek Yuen Village was 174. The number of males was 73.

== Housing ==
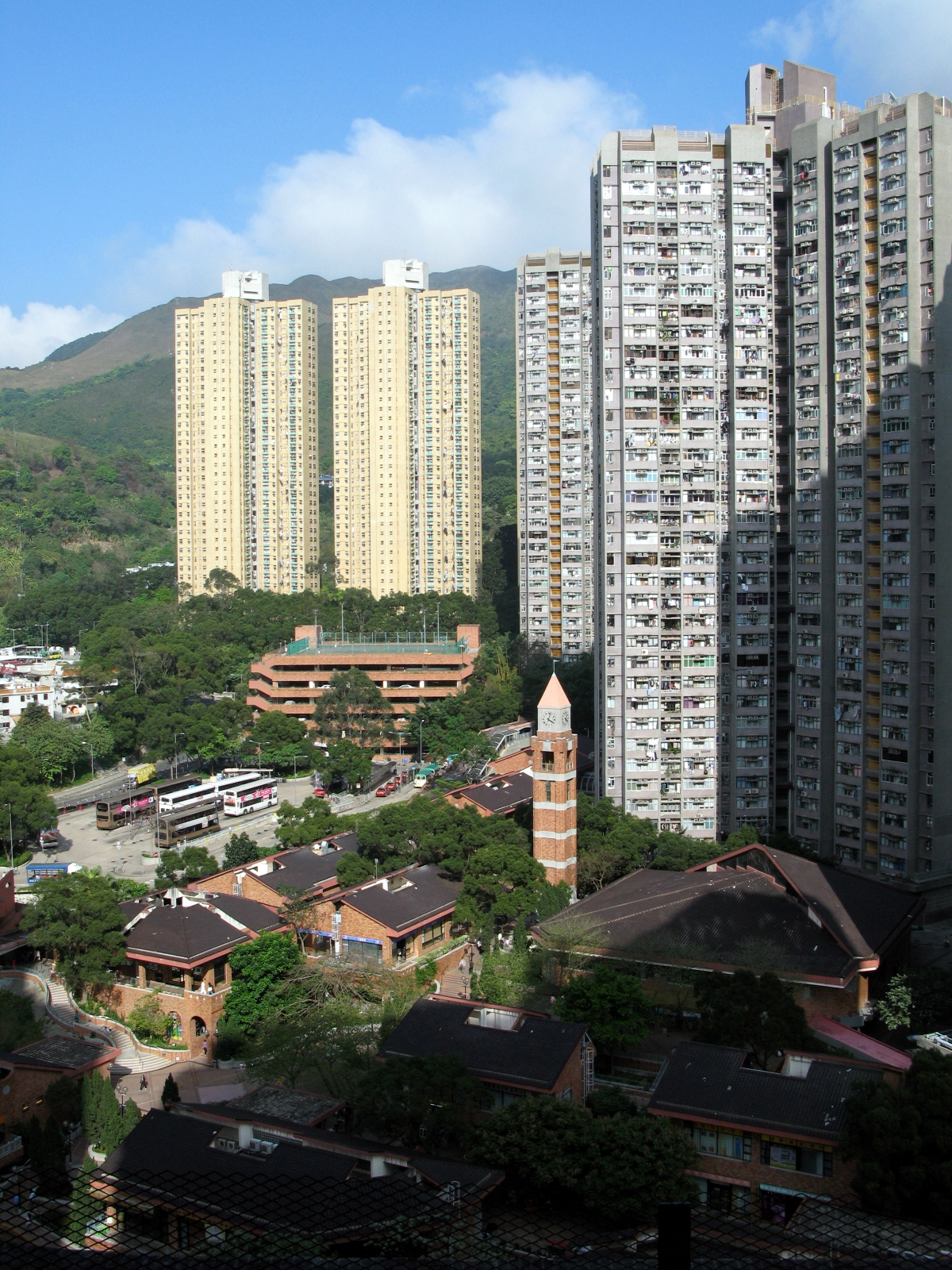
Kwong Yuen Estate in April 2008, with Hong Lam Court in the background

Kwong Yuen Estate (廣源邨), a large public housing estate, is at the centre of Siu Lek Yuen. It comprises 6 blocks. Kwong Lam Court (廣林苑) and Hong Lam Court (康林苑) are the Home Ownership Scheme courts within Kwong Yuen Estate. Two blocks of Hong Lam Court are used as Government Quarters (政府宿舍). Castello (帝堡城) is a private housing estate at the north side of Kwong Yuen Estate. Meanwhile Greenhill Villa (綠怡雅苑) is a Subsidised Sale Flats Project court developed by Hong Kong Housing Society.

=== Public Housing Estates ===
- Kwong Yuen Estate

=== Home Ownership Scheme ===
- Kwong Lam Court
- Hong Lam Court (Two blocks are Government Quarters)

=== Private Housing Estate ===
- Castello

=== Subsidised Sale Flats ===
- Greenhill Villa

== Education ==
Siu Lek Yuen is in Primary One Admission (POA) School Net 91. Within the school net are multiple aided schools (operated independently but funded with government money); no government schools are in this net.

=== Colleges and schools ===
- Hang Seng University of Hong Kong (香港恒生大學). Lies at the south-west of Siu Lek Yuen
- Stewards Pooi Kei College (香港神託會培基書院)
- Shatin Methodist Primary school (沙田循道衞理小學)
- LKWFSL Wong Yiu Nam Primary School (世界龍岡學校黃耀南小學)

== Other facilities ==
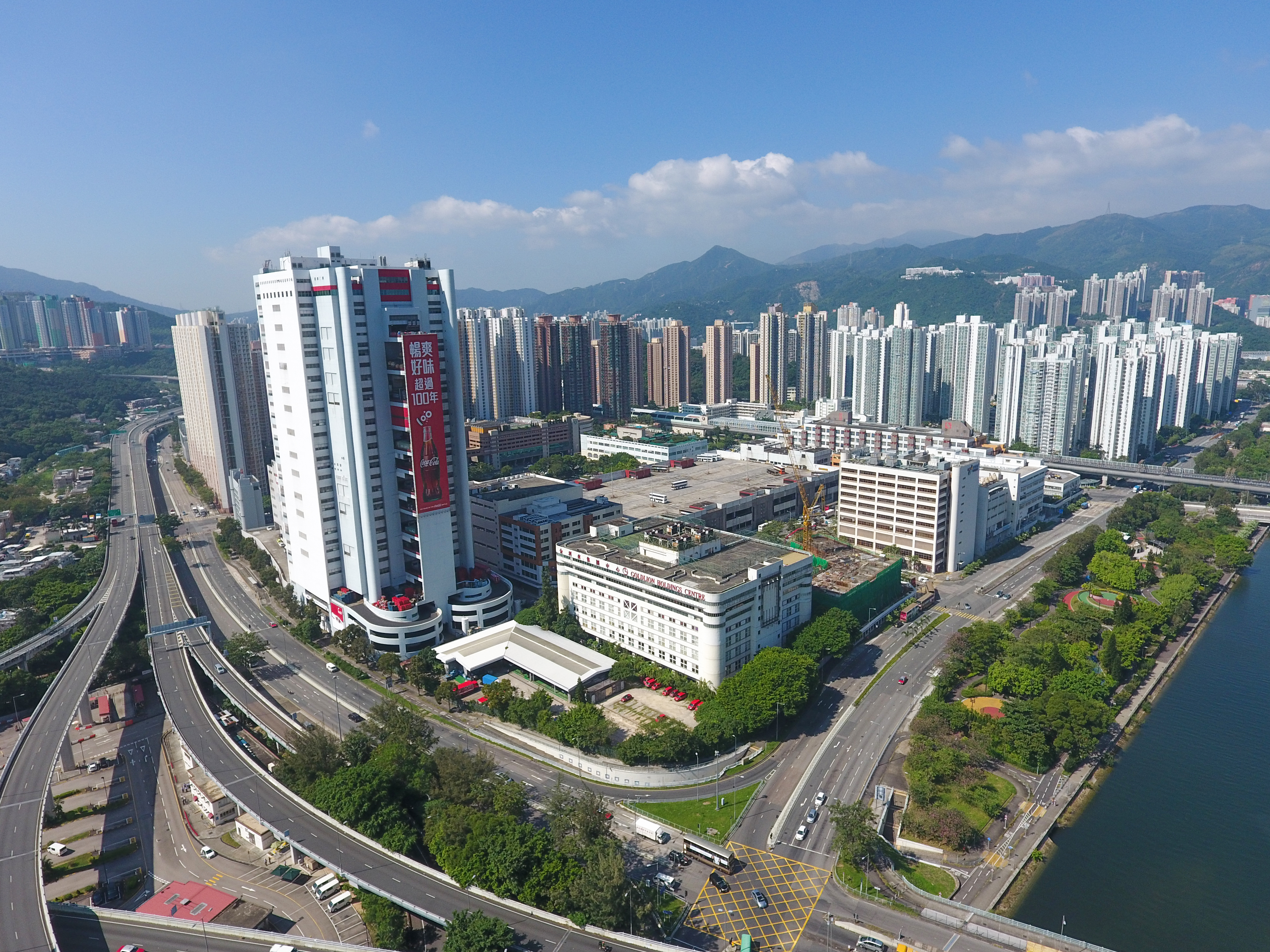
Siu Lek Yuen Industrial Area in November 2016

=== Shopping centre ===
- Kwong Yuen Shopping Centre (廣源商場)

=== Siu Lek Yuen Industrial Area (小瀝源工業區) ===
- Swire Coca-Cola HK Limited (太古可口可樂香港)
- Goldlion (Far East) Limited (金利來)

=== Others ===
- Kwong Yuen Estate Market (廣源邨街市)
- Kwong Yuen Community Centre (廣源社區中心)
- Fire station

== Transportation ==
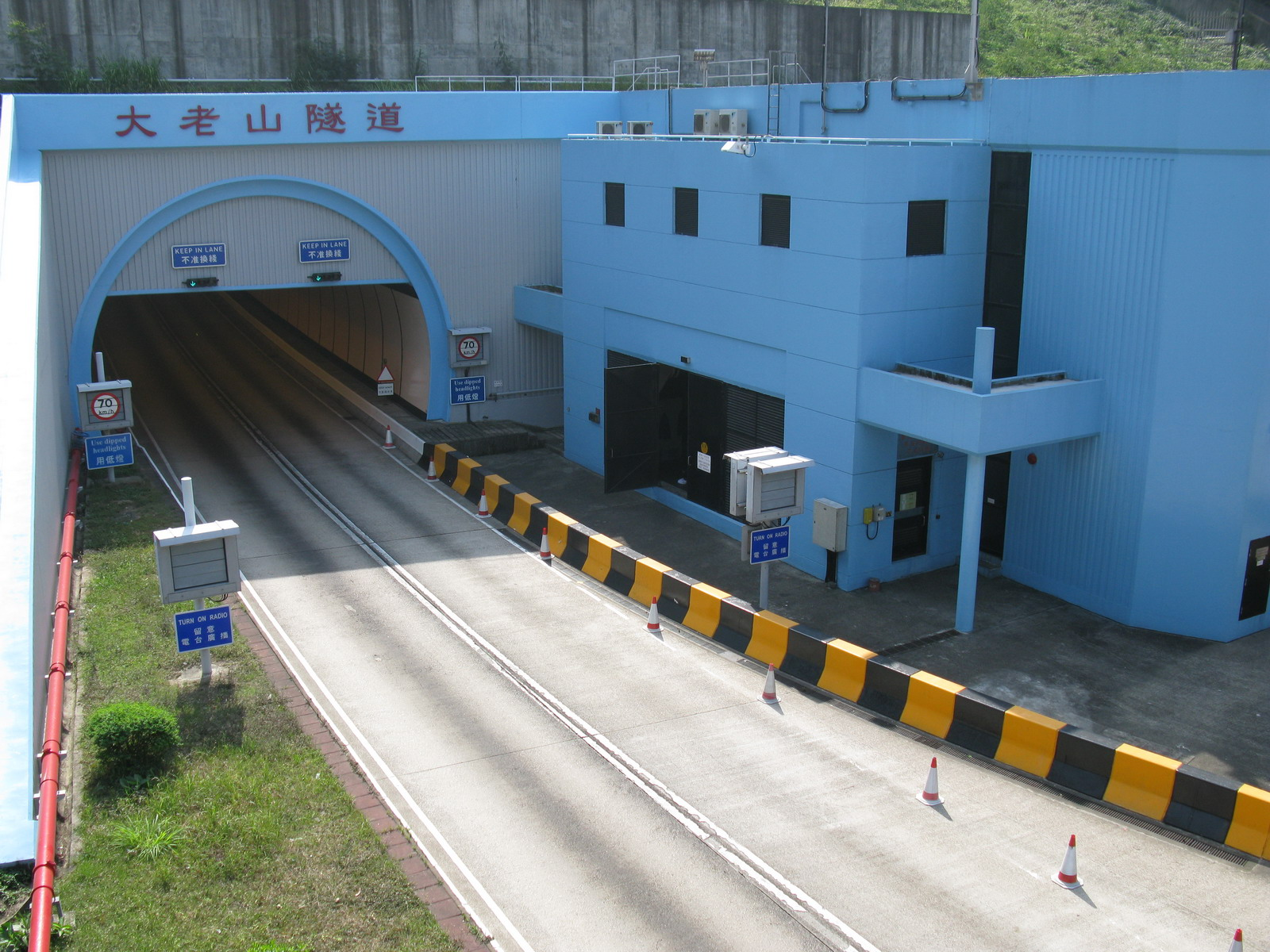
Tate's Cairn Tunnel entrance in Siu Lek Yuen in November 2007

The north entrance of Tate's Cairn Tunnel (大老山隧道, literally Big Old Mountain Tunnel) lies at the southern side of Siu Lek Yuen, making the transportation between Siu Lek Yuen to East Kowloon much easier.

There are two bus termini in the area: Kwong Yuen Bus Terminus (廣源巴士總站) and Wong Nai Tau Public Transport Interchange (黃泥頭公共運輸交匯處).

It is a 15–20 minutes walk from the area to City One MTR station or Shek Mun MTR station.

== Development ==
Owing to the decreased demand of industrial land in Hong Kong, the government plans to re-develop the Siu Lek Yuen Industrial Area. There are plans to convert the factories into offices. Hotels are also being built on former industrial areas.
