= Route 1 (Hong Kong) =

Major road in Hong Kong

Route 1
- Route 1 highlighted in red

Route information
- Maintained by Highways Department
- Length: 21.1 km (13.1 mi) 20.6 km (12.8 mi) southbound
- Existed: 1966 (Princess Margaret Road)–present

Major junctions
- South end: Aberdeen Praya Road in Aberdeen
- Gloucester Road in Causeway Bay; Route 5 (Chatham Road) in Hung Hom; Route 7 (Lung Cheung Road) in Beacon Hill; Sha Lek Highway in Sha Tin Wai
- North end: Route 9 (Tai Po Road) in Fo Tan

Location
- Country: China
- Special administrative region: Hong Kong
- Districts: Southern, Central and Western, Wan Chai, Yau Tsim Mong, Kowloon City, Wong Tai Sin, Sha Tin

Highway system
- Transport in Hong Kong; Routes; Roads and Streets
← Route 11	→ Route 2

Route 1 (Chinese: 一號幹線; Jyutping: jat1 hou6 gon3 sin3) is a major artery in Hong Kong that runs in a generally north-south direction, connecting Aberdeen with Sha Tin.

The route is heavily congested, notably on the Canal Road viaduct that links the Aberdeen Tunnel with the Cross-Harbour Tunnel in Causeway Bay. Route 1 continues to serve as the most direct route from the north shore of Hong Kong Island to the Southern District. The road travels across the harbour, runs through the middle of Kowloon, and continues north into the New Territories.

== Route ==
=== Southern District ===
The route begins at the eastern end of Aberdeen Praya Road outside Ocean Court, and follows the Hong Kong Island coastline towards Tin Wan and Pok Fu Lam. Immediately after its starting point, the route intersects with Ap Lei Chau Bridge at a trumpet interchange, providing the sole road connection to the eponymous island.

Route 1 continues along Wong Chuk Hang Road, with a short viaduct over the intersection with Nam Long Shan Road. At the end of the viaduct, there is another trumpet interchange connecting Ocean Park. The route then enters a T-interchange, where Wong Chuk Hang Road diverges from Route 1, and continues towards Repulse Bay and Stanley. Route 1 continues northeast towards Aberdeen Tunnel – the only highway tunnel connecting northern and southern Hong Kong Island. After passing through the toll gates, the route enters the southern portal of Aberdeen Tunnel.

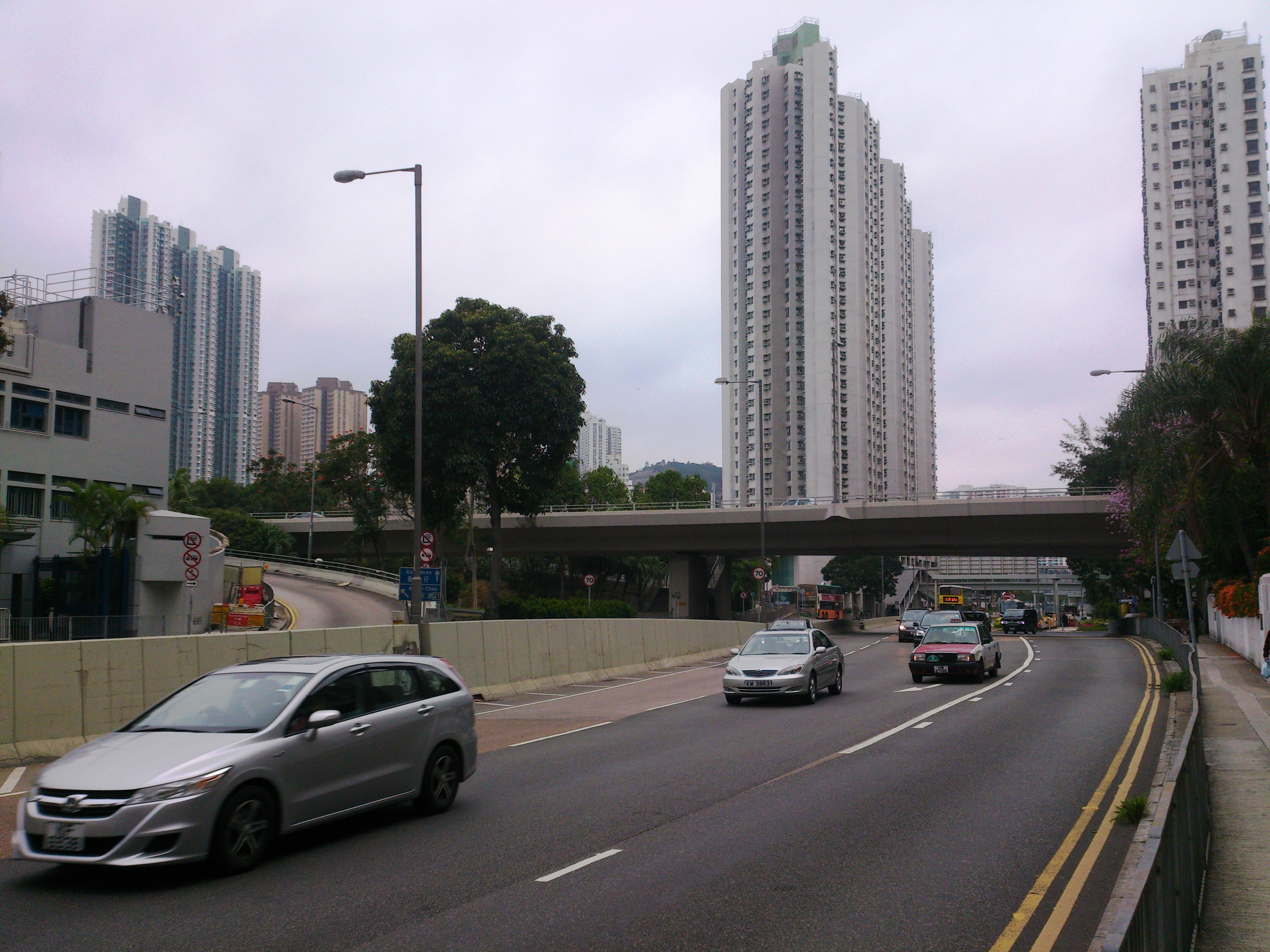
Interchange with Ap Lei Chau Bridge

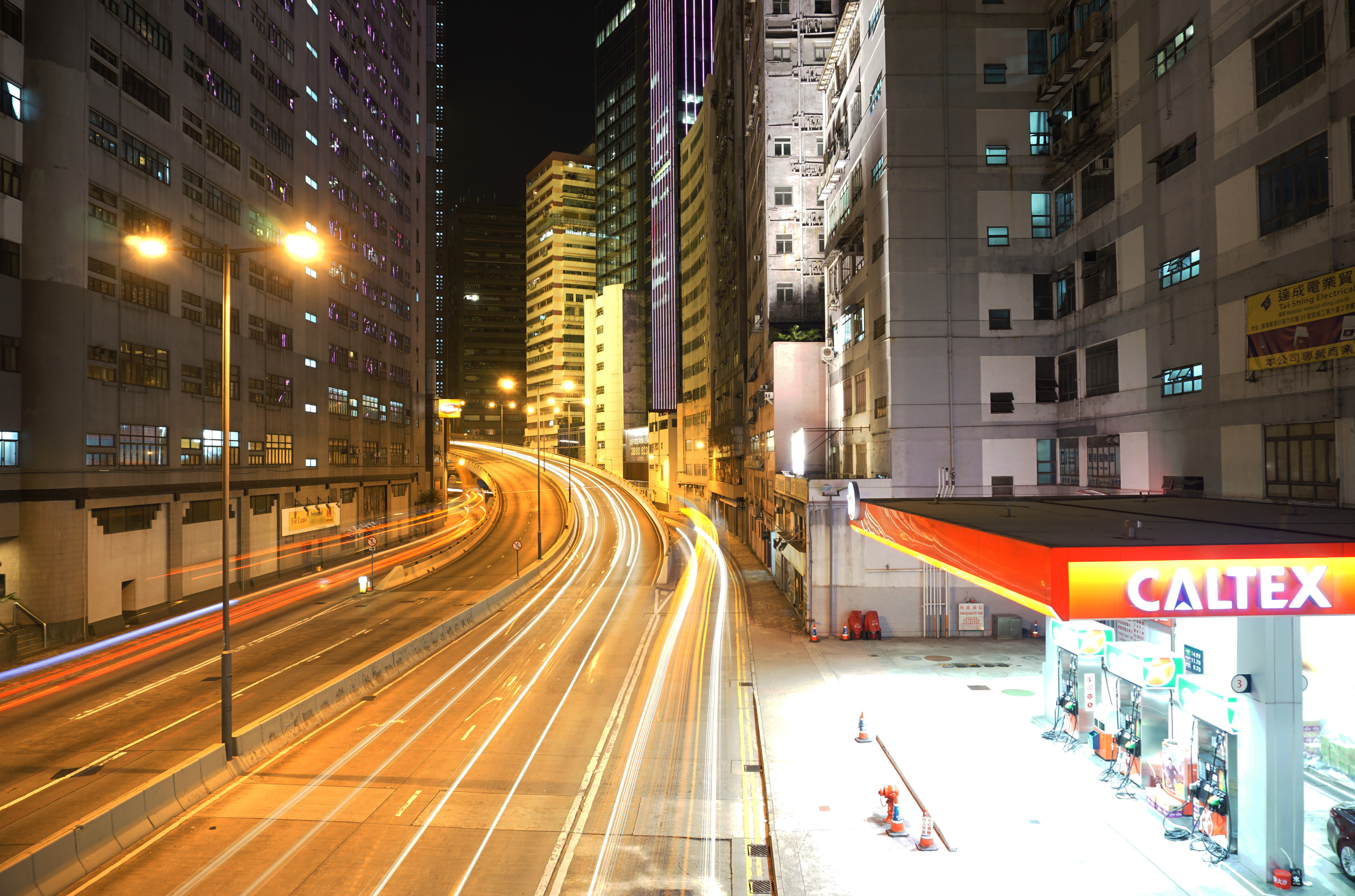
Wong Chuk Hang Road and viaduct at night

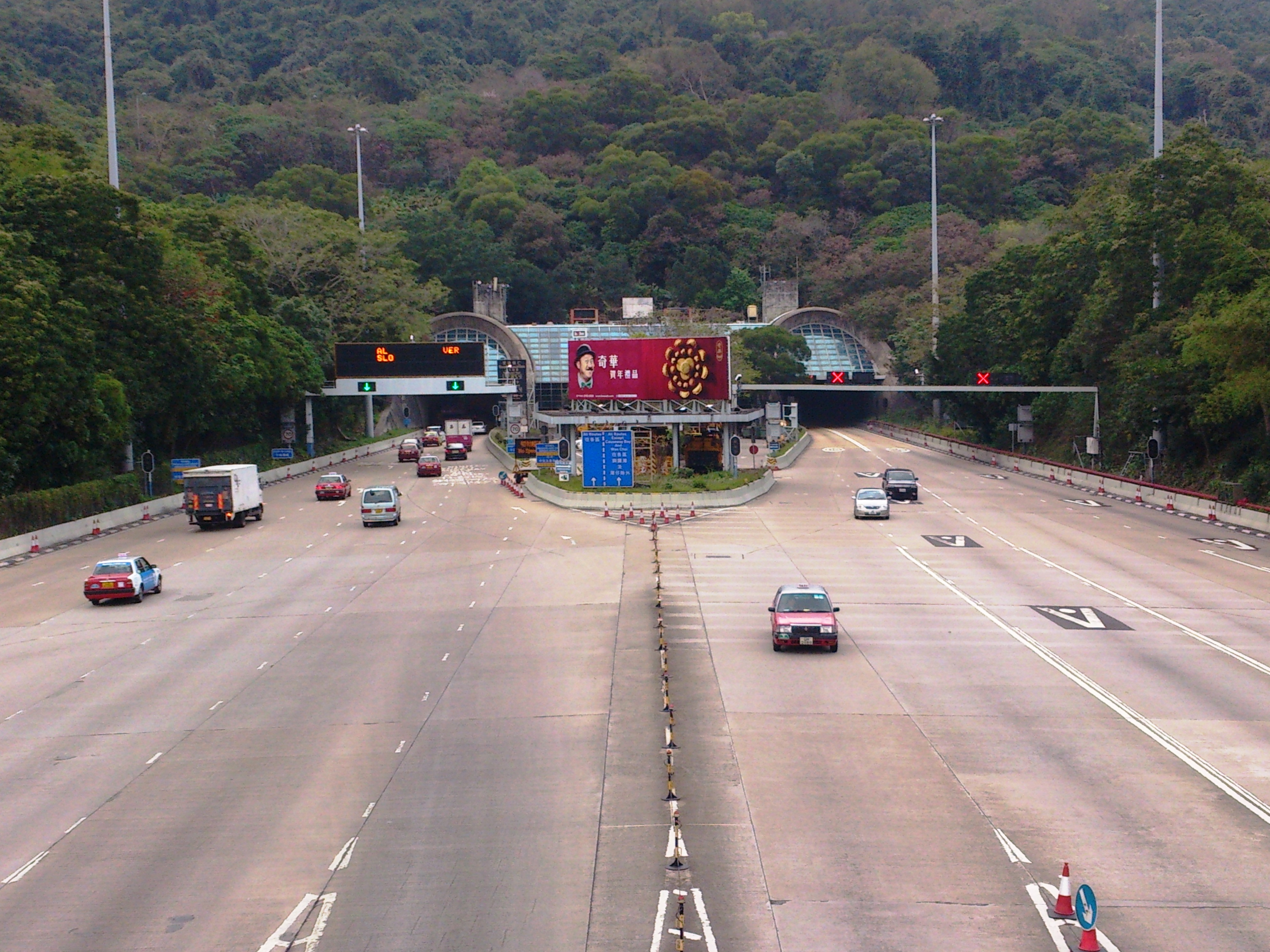
Aberdeen Tunnel southern portal

=== Wan Chai District ===
Upon leaving the tunnel, traffic runs along the Wong Nai Chung Gap Flyover (Note: Despite its name, the flyover is located more than 2 km northwest of Wong Nai Chung Gap, at the intersection of Wong Nai Chung Gap Road and Repulse Bay Road.) after exiting the tunnel at Happy Valley running above Wong Nai Chung Road. At this point, a diamond interchange connects Wan Chai and Causeway Bay with Route 1 via Queen's Road East and Leighton Road.

Route 1 then continues onto the Canal Road Flyover, with another pair of on/off-ramps outside Times Square accessible from the north. It then descends to ground level at the Wan Chai Interchange, intersecting with Gloucester Road (part of Route 4 before 2019), allowing traffic to head west into Admiralty and Central; or eastwards to Tin Hau, and further onto the Island Eastern Corridor.

The route then heads into the Cross-Harbour Tunnel. The Central–Wan Chai Bypass (part of Route 4) passes directly beneath the southern portal of the tunnel, but is not connected to Route 1.

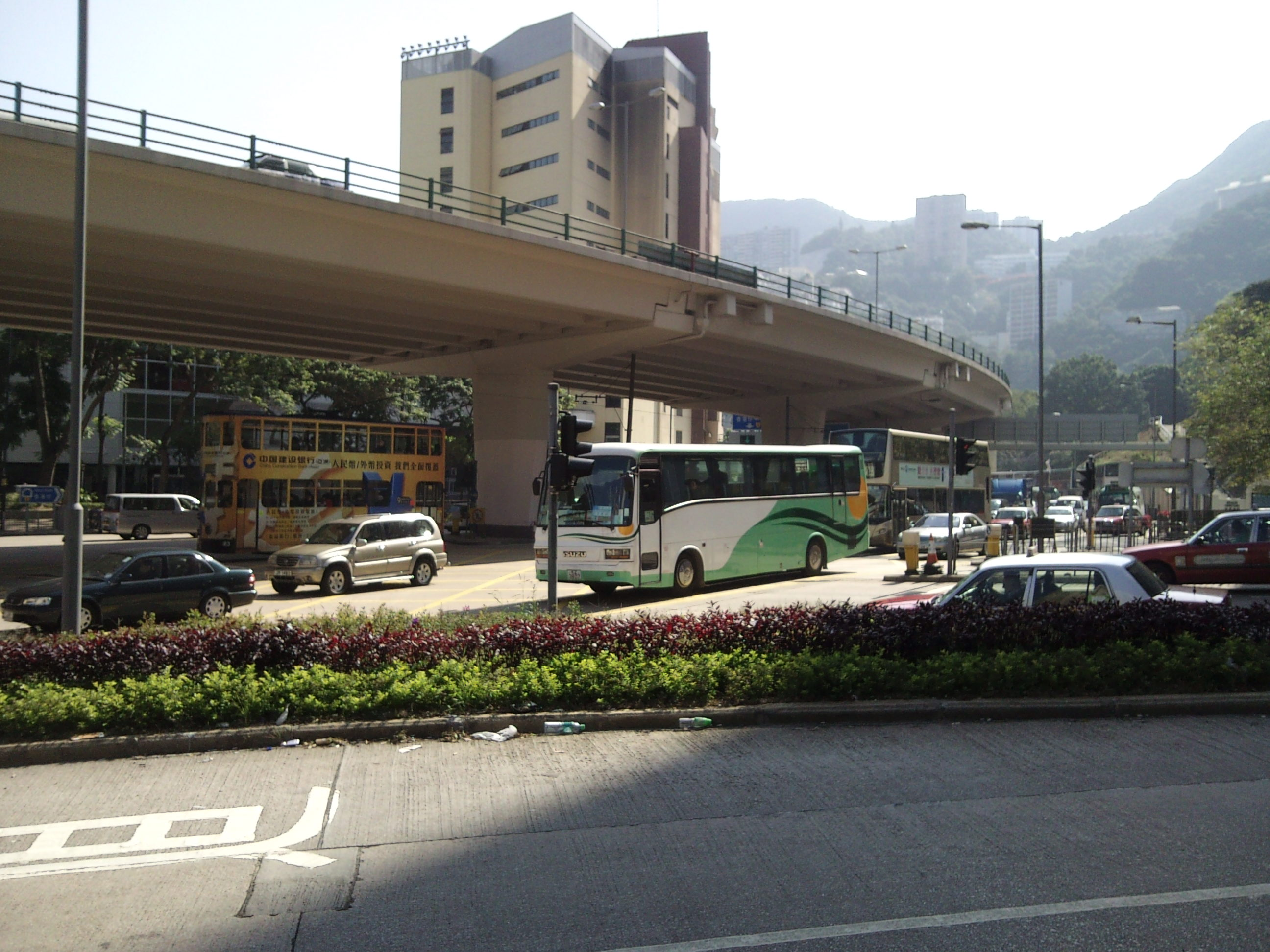
Wong Nai Chung Gap Flyover (top) and Wong Nai Chung Road (bottom)

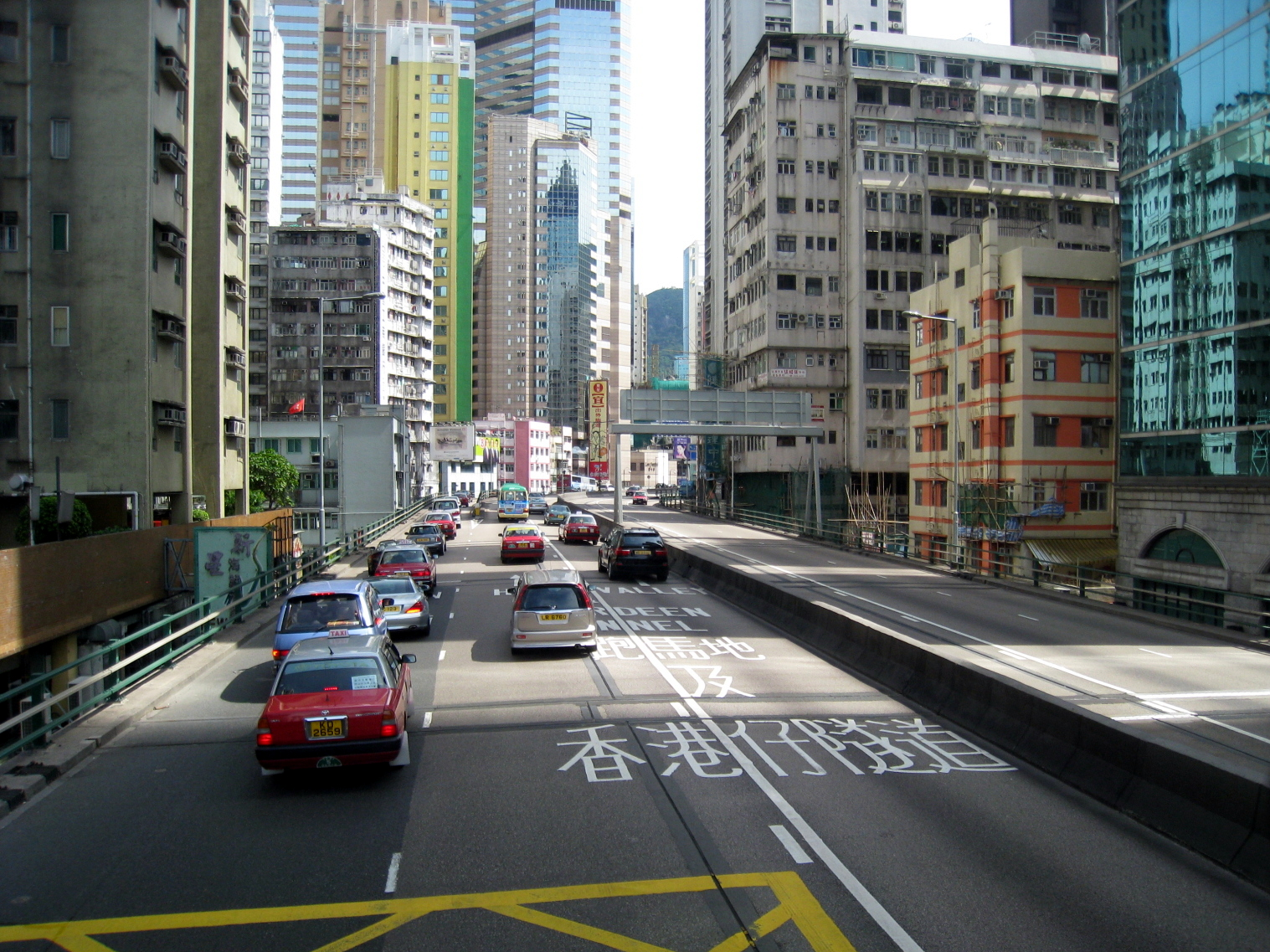
Canal Road Flyover

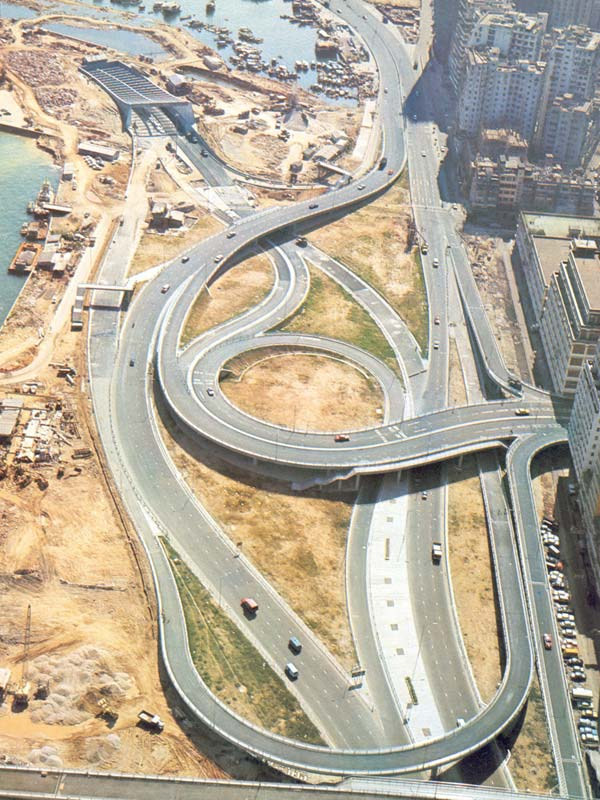
Wan Chai Interchange before the opening of the Cross-Harbour Tunnel

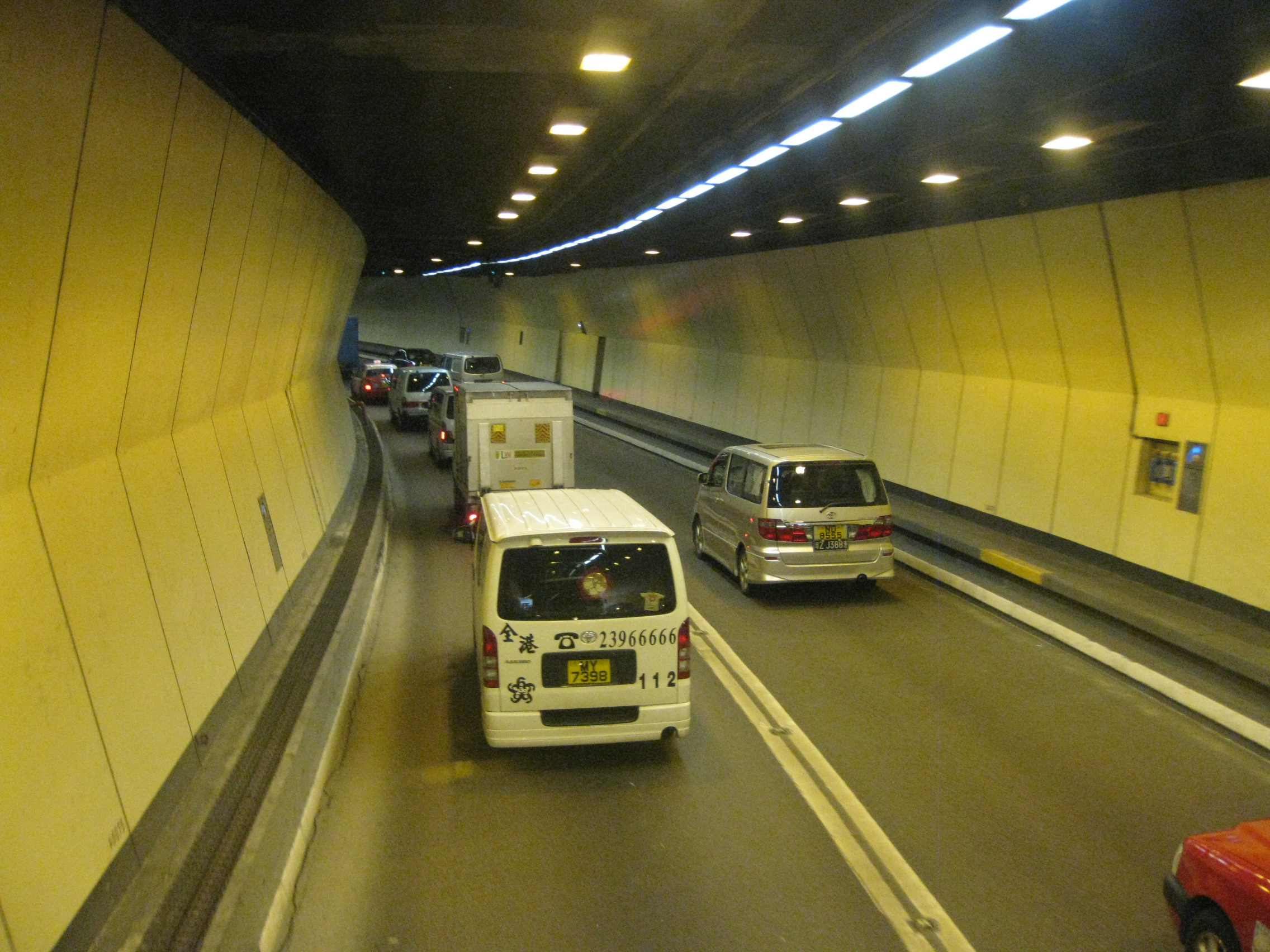
Inside the Cross-Harbour Tunnel

=== Kowloon ===
Upon reaching Kowloon, Route 1 passes through the toll gates and bus interchange of the Cross-Harbour Tunnel, situated between Hung Hom station and the Polytechnic University. It then merges into Hong Chong Road, a short trunk road that ends at the junction with Chatham Road North (Route 5), where traffic to/from the Cross-Harbour Tunnel connects with both directions of Route 5 via ramps laid out in a trumpet interchange fashion. Immediately after this junction, Route 1 is joined by traffic from Chatham Road South and Hung Hom Bypass.

At this point, Route 1 continues heading north along Princess Margaret Road, between the neighbourhoods of King's Park and Ho Man Tin. It intersects with Fat Kwong Street at a partial cloverleaf interchange. Continuing northwards, it travels over Argyle Street via an overpass, before merging into Waterloo Road from the Yau Ma Tei end. It then reaches another overpass across Prince Edward Road West and Boundary Street, which are single-directional arterial roads stretching across Kowloon westbound and eastbound, respectively. From here, traffic travelling from Sham Shui Po can access both directions of Route 1; southbound traffic on Route 1 can also exit and head towards Mong Kok or Kowloon City.

Route 1 then continues northwards, cutting through the middle of Kowloon Tong. The stretch between Flint Road and Suffolk Road is the only section of the route that is not a controlled-access highway, with numerous signal-controlled intersections. After Suffolk Road, Route 1 enters a 650 metre long overhead viaduct, allowing grade separation from the ground-level intersections with Junction Road and Cornwall Street.

After leaving Kowloon Tong, Route 1 climbs a steep, curvy incline to reach a partial cloverleaf interchange with Lung Cheung Road (Route 7), where ramps allow traffic travelling in both directions of Route 7 to merge into Route 1 towards the north. Route 1 then heads into the 1.4 km long Lion Rock Tunnel, travelling under Lion Rock, into the New Territories.

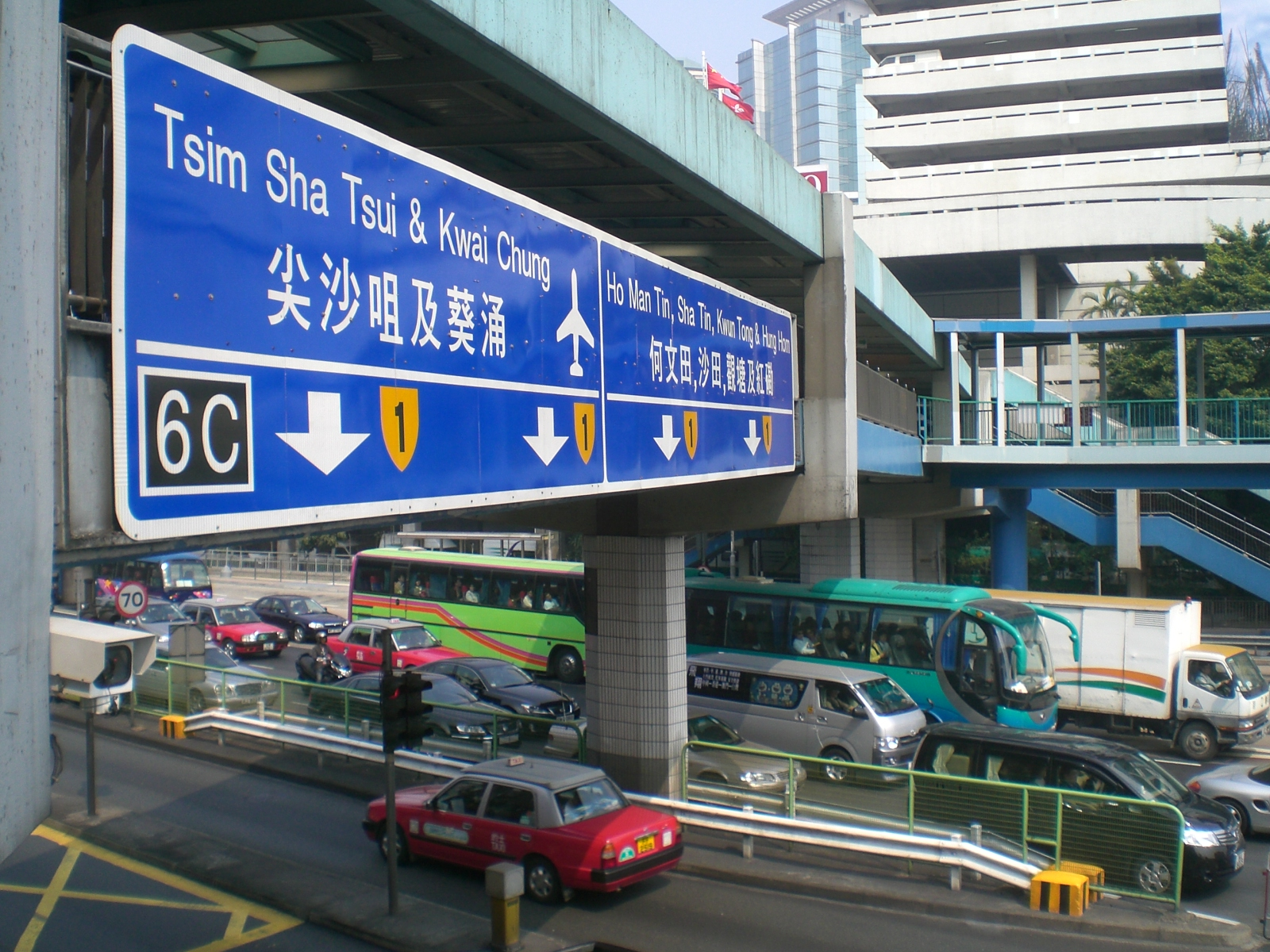
Cross-Harbour Tunnel

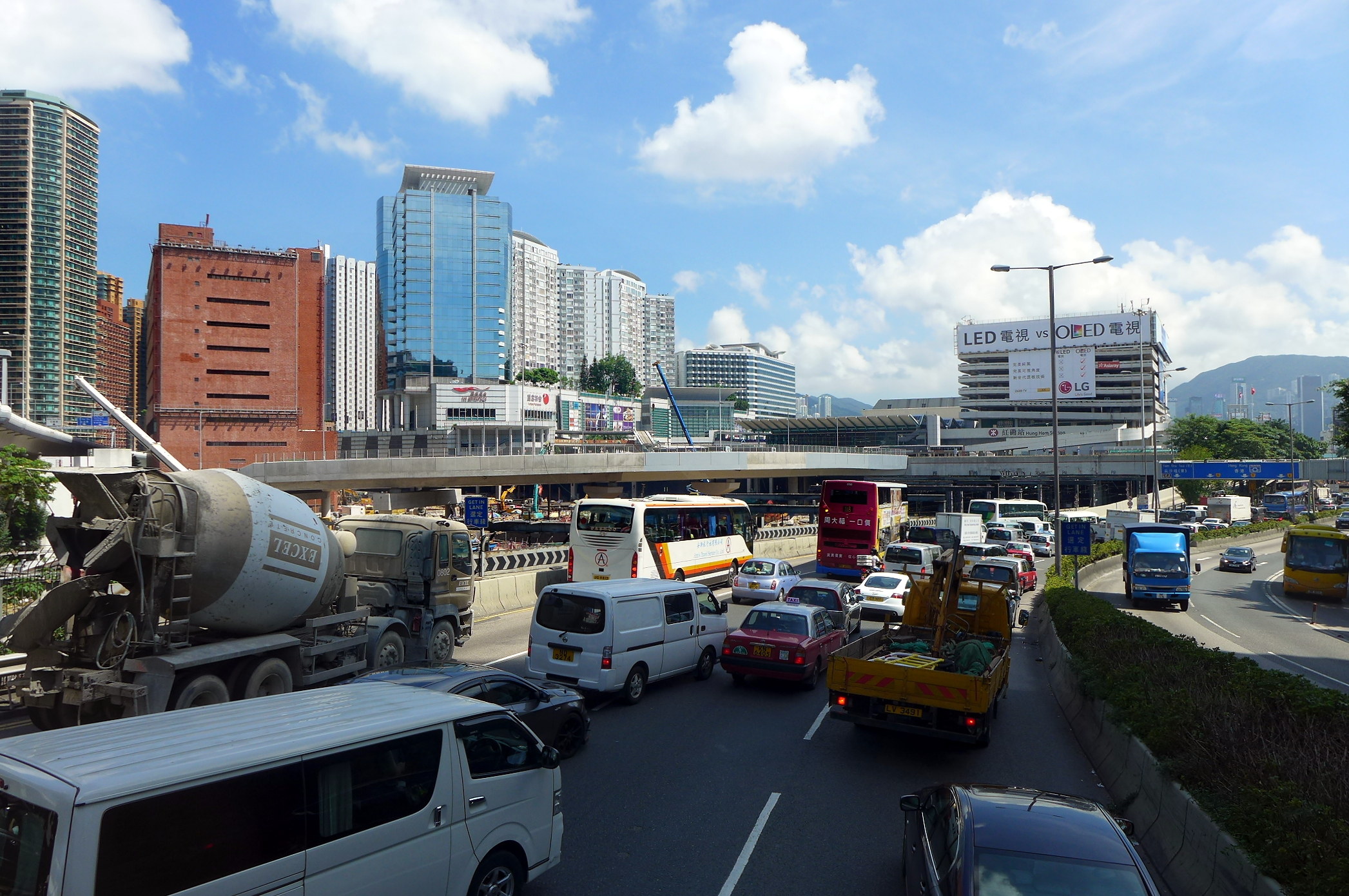
Traffic congestion at Hong Chong Road

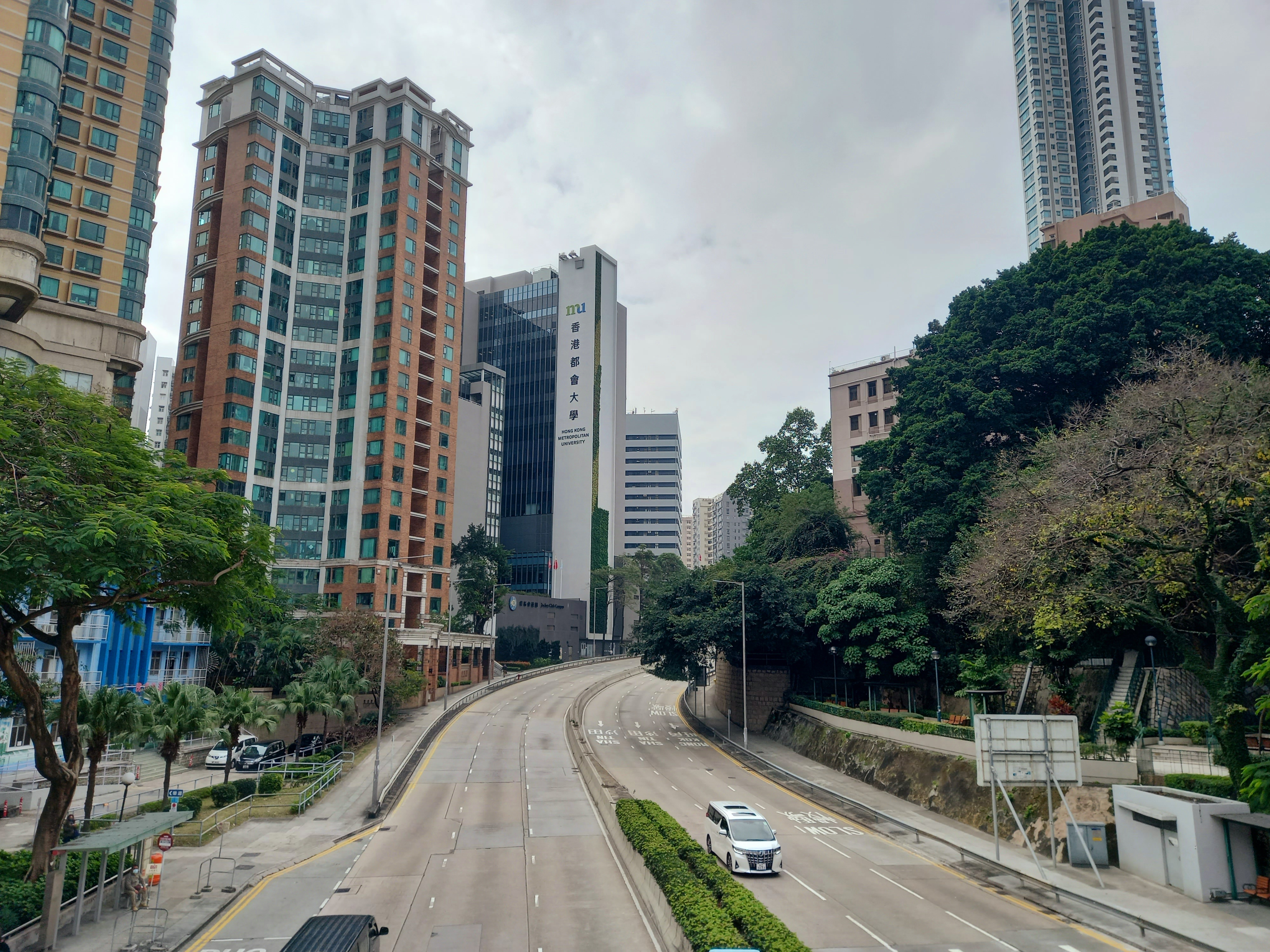
Princess Margaret Road near Hong Kong Metropolitan University

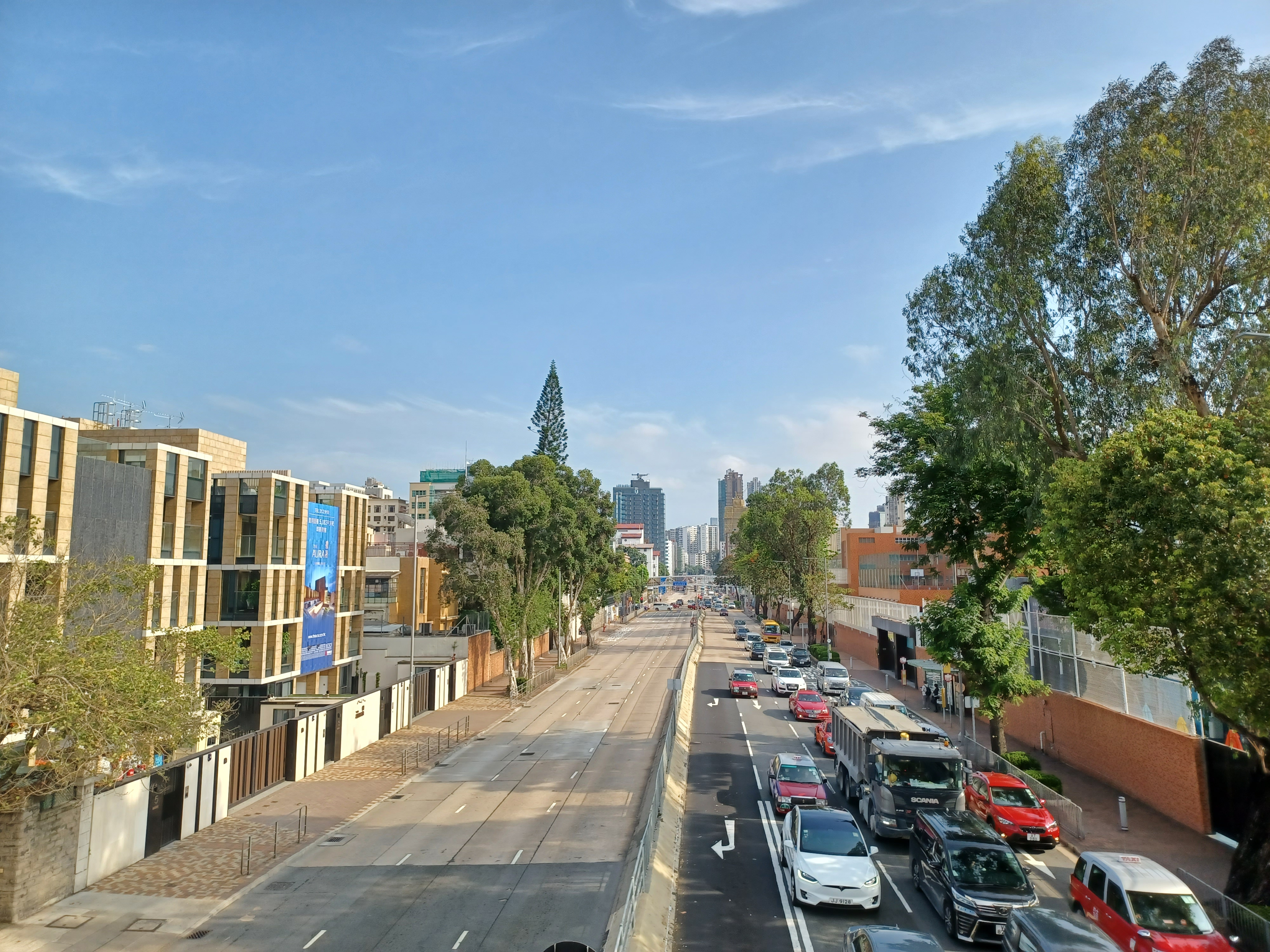
Waterloo Road at Kowloon Tong

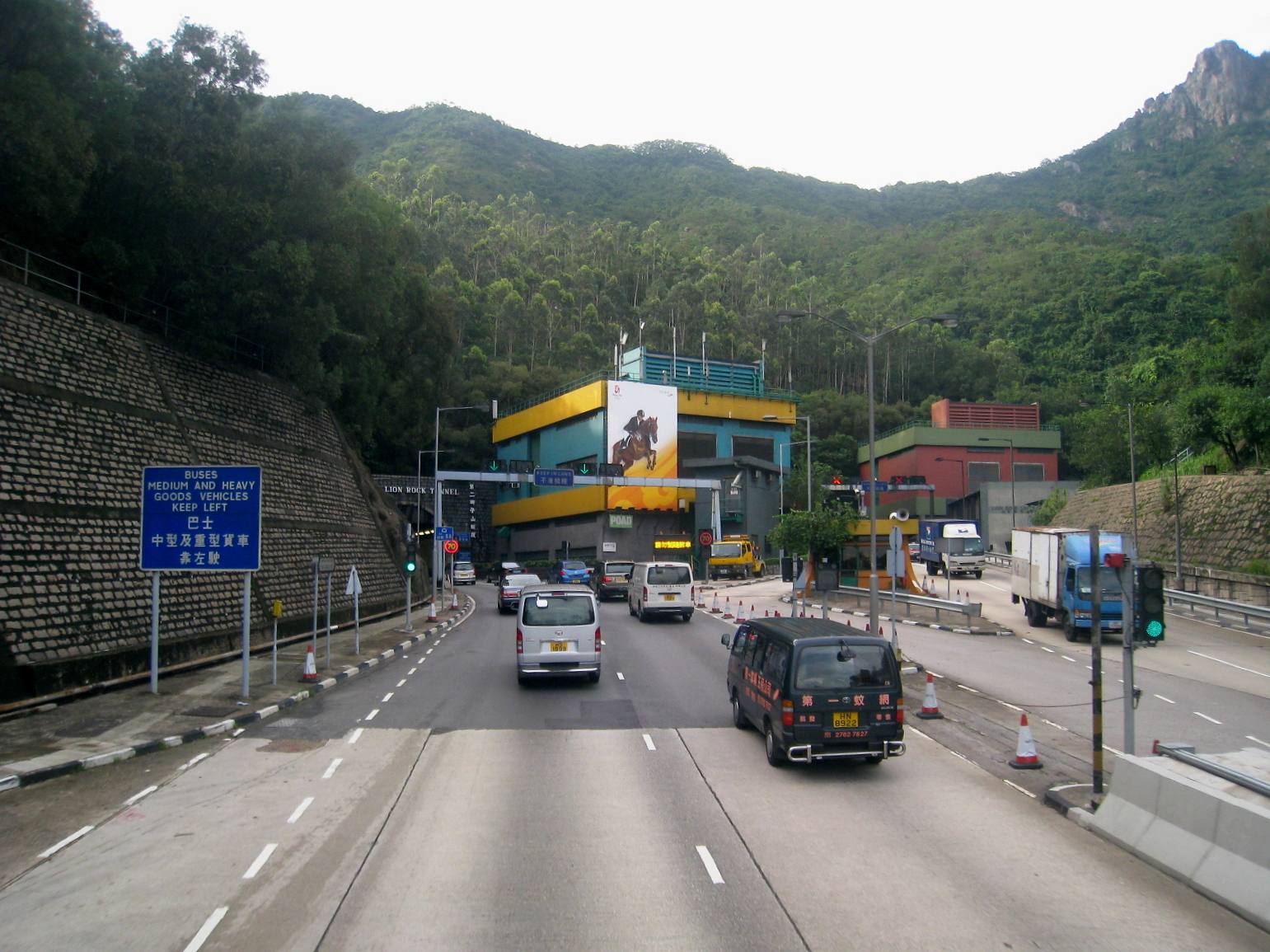
Southern portals of Lion Rock Tunnel

=== Sha Tin ===
After passing through the toll gates at the northern end of the tunnel, Route 1 continues in a northeasterly direction along Lion Rock Tunnel Road, roughly along the eastern edge of the Sha Tin New Town. It then intersects with Hung Mui Kuk Road at a trumpet interchange, which leads to Tai Wai. After passing the Sun Tin Wai Estate, Route 1 runs along Sha Tin Road, diverging from Lion Rock Tunnel Road which leads to Sha Tin town centre.

The remaining 3 km section along Sha Tin Road is the only expressway section of Route 1. At Sha Tin Wai, the Sha Lek Highway diverges from Route 1 heading towards the interchange with Route 2 towards Ma On Shan or Kowloon East. This is immediately followed by a diamond interchange with Sha Tin Wai Road. The route then turns northwards, passing by City One with a partial diamond interchange leading onto Tai Chung Kiu Road. It then crosses over the Shing Mun River via the 500 metre long Dragon Bridge.

Across the river, Route 1 reaches another partial diamond interchange with Yuen Wo Road, accessible from the northern side. It then joins Tai Po Road – Sha Tin at Fo Tan, where the traffic continues northwards via Route 9 towards Tai Po and Fanling. On the northbound side, Route 1 continues along Tai Po Road for another 250 metres as the outermost vehicular lane, reaching another exit ramp towards Penfold Park before merging into Route 9.

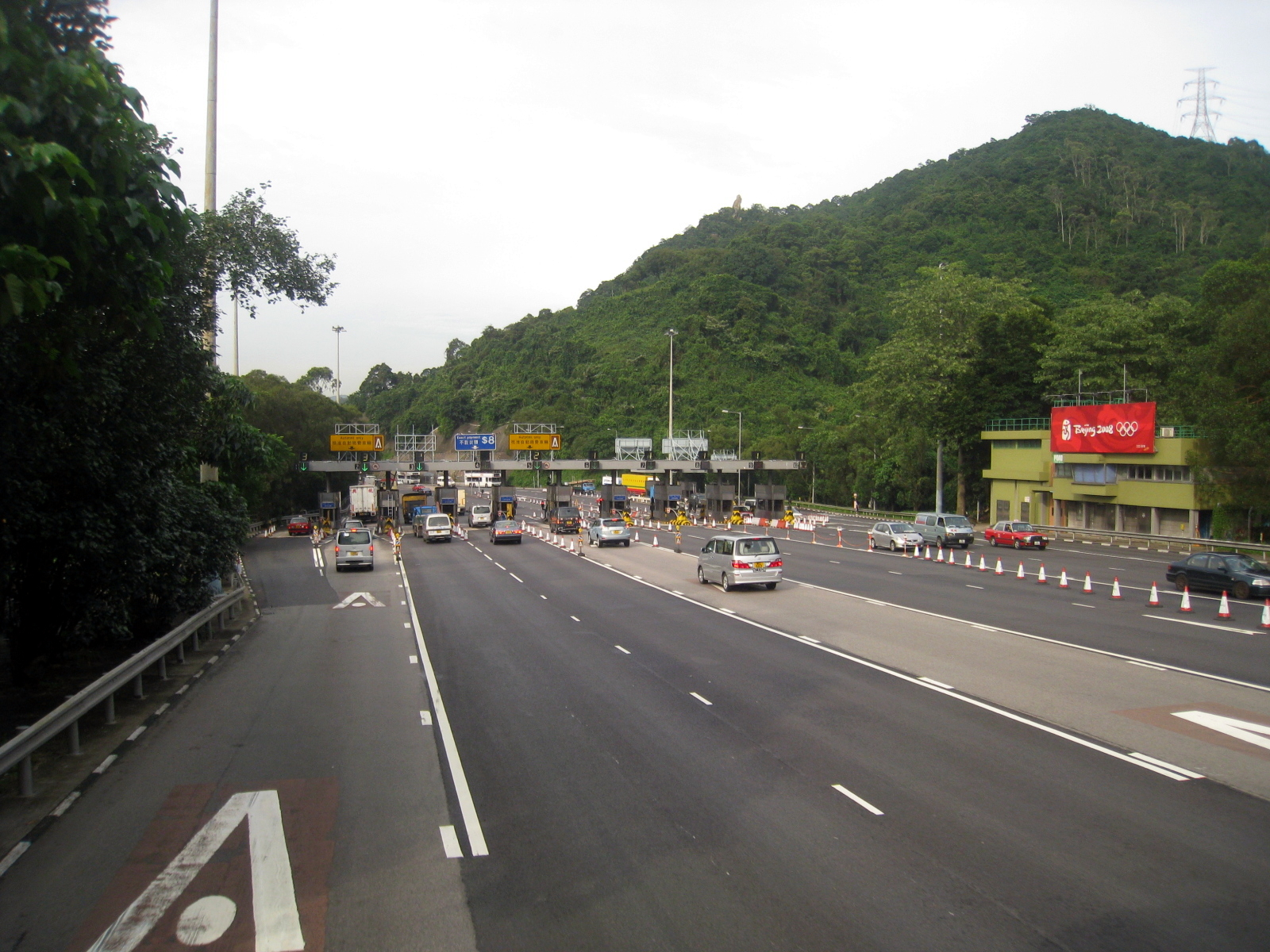
Lion Rock Tunnel toll gates

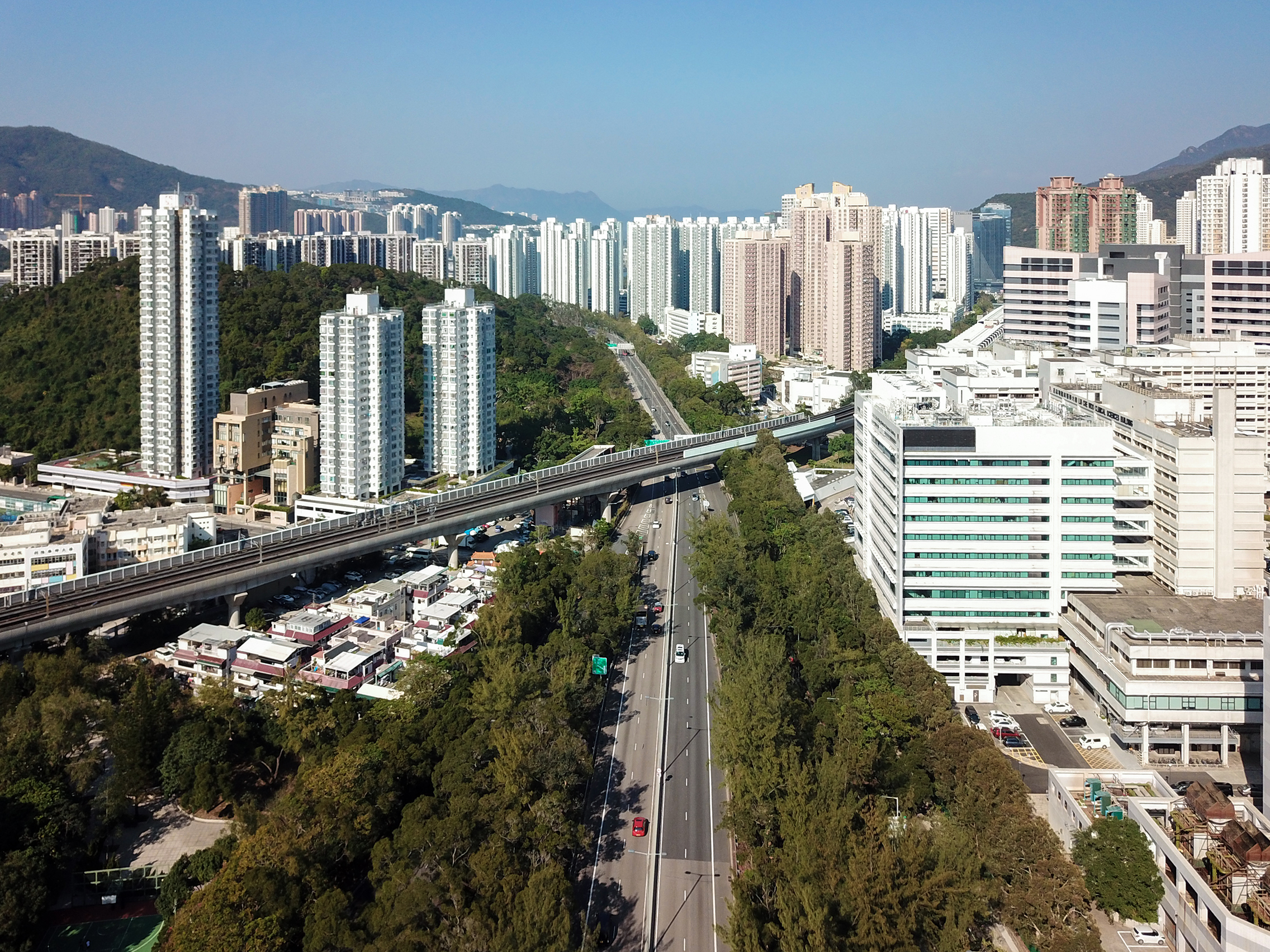
Sha Tin Road passing under Tuen Ma line tracks

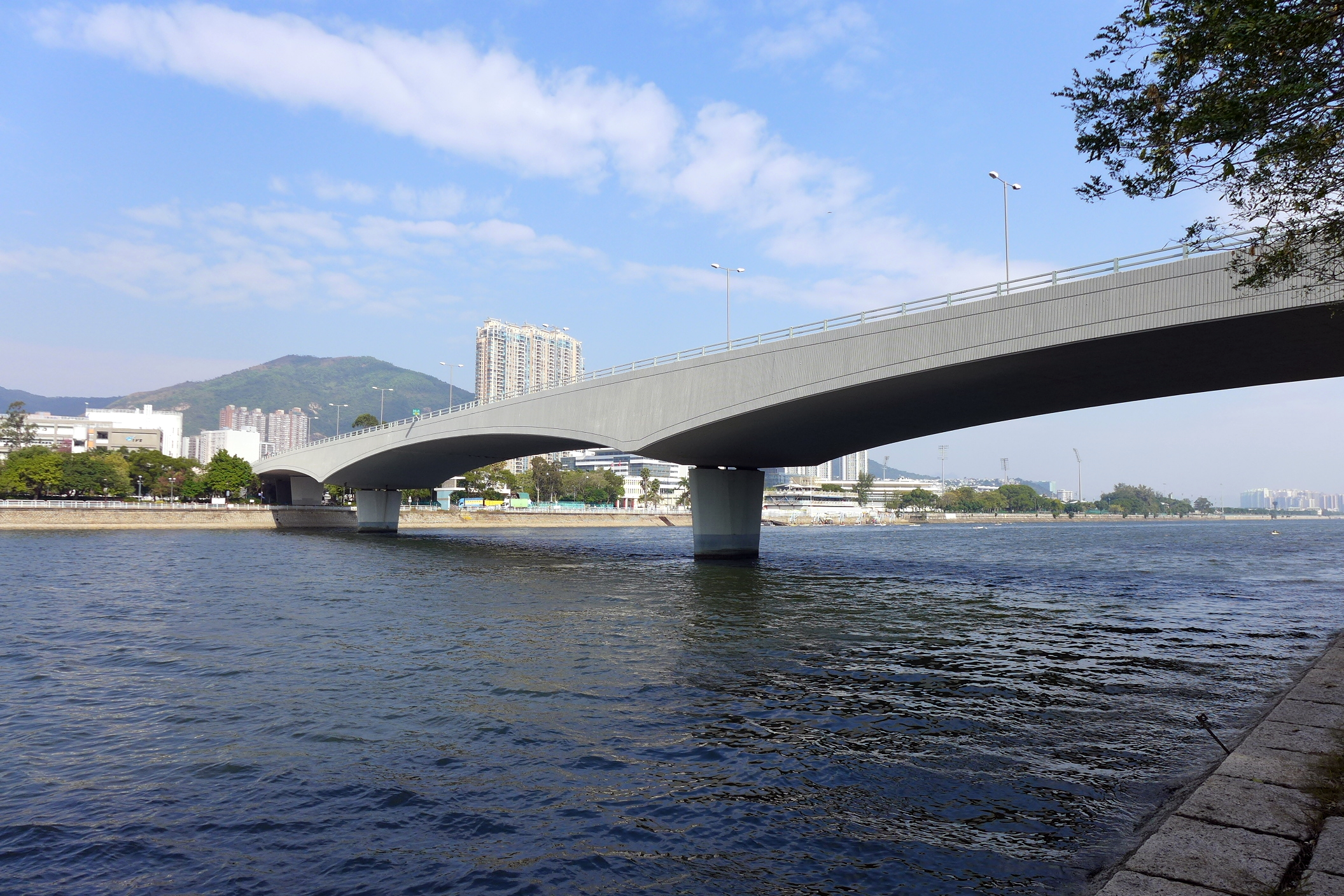
Dragon Bridge

== History ==
Route 1 was established in January 2004 when the third generation of route numbers came into use, replacing the old system which had been used since 1974.

== Future ==
=== Expansion of Lion Rock Tunnel ===
The Highways Department has proposed to enlarge the existing Lion Rock Tunnel, and widen its connecting roads, in order to refurbish the tunnels which have deteriorated through age, as well as to help alleviate congestion around the tunnel and adjacent sections of Route 1.

Upon completion, the existing southbound portal will be refurbished and widened to three lanes, and a new three-lane portal will be constructed between the portals for carrying northbound traffic. The existing northbound portal (Second Lion Rock Tunnel) will be mothballed for emergency use. In addition, the section of the Lion Rock Tunnel Road from the Sha Tin portals to Fung Shing Court will be widened from two to three lanes in both directions. To the south of the tunnel, the two slip roads connecting Lung Cheung Road to / from the east (Wong Tai Sin direction) will be widened from one to two lanes.

Construction is expected to commence in 2025, and the project is forecasted to be fully open by 2033.

=== Trunk Road T4 ===
The proposed Trunk Road T4, which is currently in the design stage, will be connected to Route 1. Diverging from Sha Tin Road to the west outside Pok Hong Estate, the new route will cross the Shing Mun River and merge into Tsing Sha Highway (Route 8) and the Shing Mun Tunnels (Route 9). In addition, a slip road from Lion Rock Tunnel Road outside Tsang Tai Uk towards the northbound carriageway of Sha Tin Road will be built. Construction is expected to start in late 2023.

== Exit list ==
District	Location	km	mi	Exit	Destinations	Notes
Southern	Aberdeen	0.0	0.0	—	Aberdeen Praya Road - Aberdeen, Pok Fu Lam	Southern terminus
Southern	Aberdeen	0.0– 0.2	0.0– 0.12	1	Ap Lei Chau Bridge	
Southern	Wong Chuk Hang	0.2	0.12	1A	Heung Yip Road	Southbound only
Southern	Wong Chuk Hang	0.4	0.25	—	Yip Kan Street	Yip Kan Street to southbound only
Southern	Wong Chuk Hang	0.5– 1.1	0.31– 0.68	2	Wong Chuk Hang Road to Nam Long Shan Road	
Southern	Wong Chuk Hang	1.2– 1.3	0.75– 0.81	3	Ocean Park Road	
Southern	Wong Chuk Hang	1.4– 2.0	0.87– 1.2	4	Wong Chuk Hang Road / Nam Fung Road	No access to/from southbound
Southern	Wong Chuk Hang	2.1	1.3	Aberdeen Tunnel Toll Plaza		
Southern– Wan Chai	Wong Chuk Hang– Happy Valley	2.3– 4.2	1.4– 2.6	Aberdeen Tunnel		
Wan Chai	Morrison Hill	4.3– 4.9	2.7– 3.0	5	Wong Nai Chung Road	To/from Route 1 northbound only
Wan Chai	East Point	5.3	3.3	5A	Canal Road West / Canal Road East	To/from Route 1 southbound only
Wan Chai	East Point	5.4– 5.9	3.4– 3.7	6	Gloucester Road - Central, Wan Chai; Victoria Park Road - Tin Hau, North Point, Kowloon East	
Wan Chai– Yau Tsim Mong	East Point– Hung Hom Bay	6.0– 7.8	3.7– 4.8	Cross-Harbour Tunnel		
Yau Tsim Mong	Hung Hom	8.1	5.0	Cross-Harbour Tunnel Toll Plaza		
Yau Tsim Mong	Hung Hom	8.2	5.1	—	Hong Chong Road	Hong Chong Road to northbound Route 1 only
Yau Tsim Mong	Hung Hom	8.4	5.2	6A	Salisbury Road	Southbound only
Yau Tsim Mong	Hung Hom	8.4	5.2	6B	Railway Approach	Southbound only
Yau Tsim Mong	Hung Hom	8.4	5.2	6C	Route 5 west (Chatham Road North)	Route 1 northbound to Route 5 westbound
Yau Tsim Mong	Hung Hom	8.6	5.3	6D	Route 5 east (Chatham Road North)	Route 1 northbound to Route 5 eastbound
Yau Tsim Mong	No. 12 Hill	9.0	5.6	7A	Princess Margaret Road	To/from Route 1 northbound only
Yau Tsim Mong	No. 12 Hill	9.0	5.6	7B	Princess Margaret Road Link	To from Route 1 northbound only
Kowloon City	No. 12 Hill	9.1– 9.4	5.7– 5.8	7D	Chi Man Street	Southbound only
Yau Tsim Mong	No. 12 Hill	9.3	5.8	7C	Wylie Road	Northbound only
Kowloon City	No. 12 Hill	9.7	6.0	7E	Chung Man Street	Southbound only
Kowloon City	Ho Man Tin	10.0	6.2	8	Man Fung Path / Sheung Hing Street to Pui Ching Road	No access to Route 1 southbound from Pui Ching Road westbound
Kowloon City	Ho Man Tin	10.0	6.2	—	Princess Margaret Road to Argyle Street	To/from southbound Route 1 only
Kowloon City	Ho Man Tin	11.0	6.8	8A	Waterloo Road	
Kowloon City	Ho Man Tin	11.0	6.8	—	Boundary Street	Boundary Street to Route 1 southbound only
Kowloon City	Ho Man Tin	11.0	6.8	8B	Prince Edward Road West	Southbound only
Kowloon City	Kowloon Tong	11.0	6.8	8C	Waterloo Road	
Kowloon City	Kowloon Tong	11.0	6.8	8D	Flint Road	Southbound exit only
Kowloon City	Kowloon Tong	11.0	6.8	9	Essex Crescent / Lancashire Road	Northbound only
Kowloon City	Kowloon Tong	12.0	7.5	9A	Rutland Quadrant / Durham Road	Southbound only
Kowloon City	Kowloon Tong	12.0	7.5	9C	Hereford Road	No access from Hereford Road to Route 1 northbound
Kowloon City	Kowloon Tong	12.0	7.5	—	York Road	York Road to Route 1 northbound only
Kowloon City	Kowloon Tong	12.0	7.5	9E	Norfolk Road	Northbound exit only
Kowloon City	Kowloon Tong	12.0	7.5	9F	Waterloo Road to Cornwall Street / Junction Road	
Kowloon City	Kowloon Tong	13.0	8.1	9G	Waterloo Road / Ede Road	Ede Road to Route 1 northbound only
Kowloon City	Kowloon Tong	13.0	8.1	10A	Route 7 west (Lung Cheung Road)	Route 7 westbound to/from Route 1 northbound
Kowloon City–Wong Tai Sin	Kowloon Tong	13.0	8.1	10B	Route 7 east (Lung Cheung Road)	Route 7 eastbound to/from Route 1 northbound
Kowloon City– Sha Tin	Kowloon Tsai– Tai Wai	14.0– 15.0	8.7– 9.3	Lion Rock Tunnel/Second Lion Rock Tunnel		
Sha Tin	Tai Wai	15.0	9.3	Lion Rock Tunnel Toll Plaza		
Sha Tin	Tai Wai	16.0	9.9	11	Hung Mui Kuk Road	
Sha Tin	Sha Tin	17.0	10.6	11A	Lion Rock Tunnel Road / Che Kung Miu Road / Tai Chung Kiu Road	To/from Route 1 southbound
Sha Tin	Sha Tin	18.0	11.2	11B	Sha Lek Highway	To/from Route 1 southbound
Sha Tin	Sha Tin	19.0	11.8	12	Sha Tin Wai Road	
Sha Tin	Sha Tin	20.0	12.4	12A	Fo Tan Road / Tai Chung Kiu Road	To/from Route 1 southbound
Sha Tin	Fo Tan	21.0	13.0	12B	Sha Tin Road to Yuen Wo Road	To/from Route 1 southbound
Sha Tin	Fo Tan	21.0	13.0	—	Route 9 north (Tai Po Road) – Tai Po, Fanling	Northern terminus
1.000 mi = 1.609 km; 1.000 km = 0.621 mi: Incomplete access; Tolled
