= Hong Kong Link =

Company owned by the Government of Hong Kong

- 香港五隧一橋有限公司
- Formation: April 2004; 22 years ago
- Location: Hong Kong
- Owner: Government of Hong Kong

Hong Kong Link
- Traditional Chinese: 香港五隧一橋有限公司
Transcriptions
Yue: Cantonese
- Yale Romanization: Hēung góng seuih yāt kìuh yáuh haahn gūng sī
- Jyutping: Hoeng1 gong2 ng5 seoi6 jat1 kiu4 jau5 haan6 gung1 si1

Hong Kong Link 2004 Limited (Chinese: 香港五隧一橋有限公司) is a company wholly owned by the Government of Hong Kong created to securitise revenue from five government-owned toll tunnels and the Lantau Link. The HK$6 billion securitisation was launched in April 2004.

The Chinese name of Hong Kong Link literally means "five tunnels and one bridge", for the facilities it comprises, namely:

- Aberdeen Tunnel
- Cross-Harbour Tunnel
- Lion Rock Tunnel
- Shing Mun Tunnels
- Tseung Kwan O Tunnel
- Lantau Link (including Tsing Ma Bridge)

== See also ==
- Transport in Hong Kong
