= Rutland Quadrant =

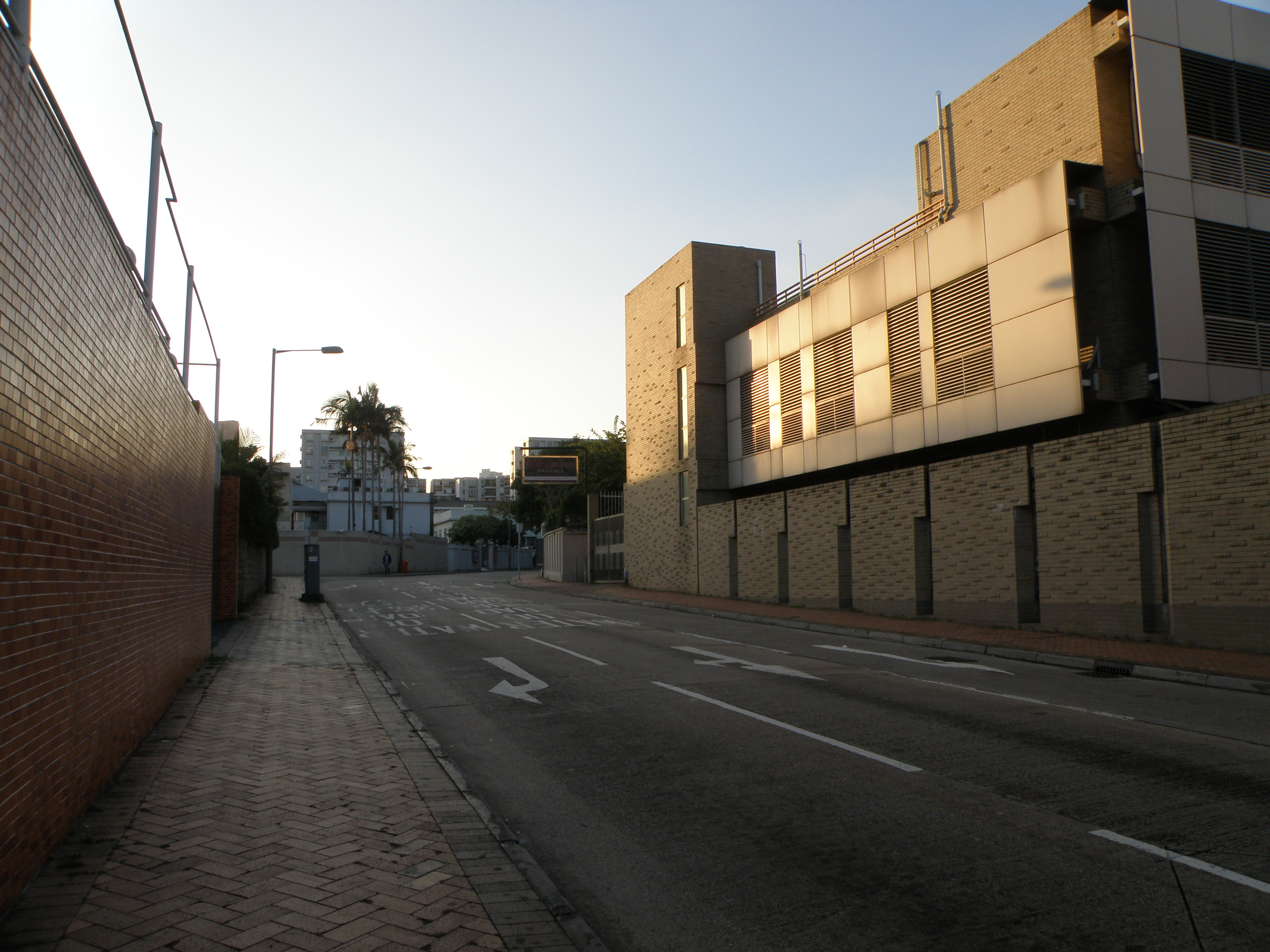
- Interactive map of Rutland Quadrant
- Length: 0.3 kilometres
- Location: Kowloon Tong
- East: Waterloo Road
- West: York Road

Rutland Quadrant (Chinese: 律倫街) is a one-way road located in Kowloon, Hong Kong. It can be accessed through the Exit 9A of Route 1. In its name, "Rutland" comes from 'Rutland County' in England while "Quadrant" comes from its curvature is ¼ of a circle.
