= Canal Road, Hong Kong =

Road in Wan Chai District, Hong Kong

Coordinates: 22.27791°N 114.18117°E

Canal Road
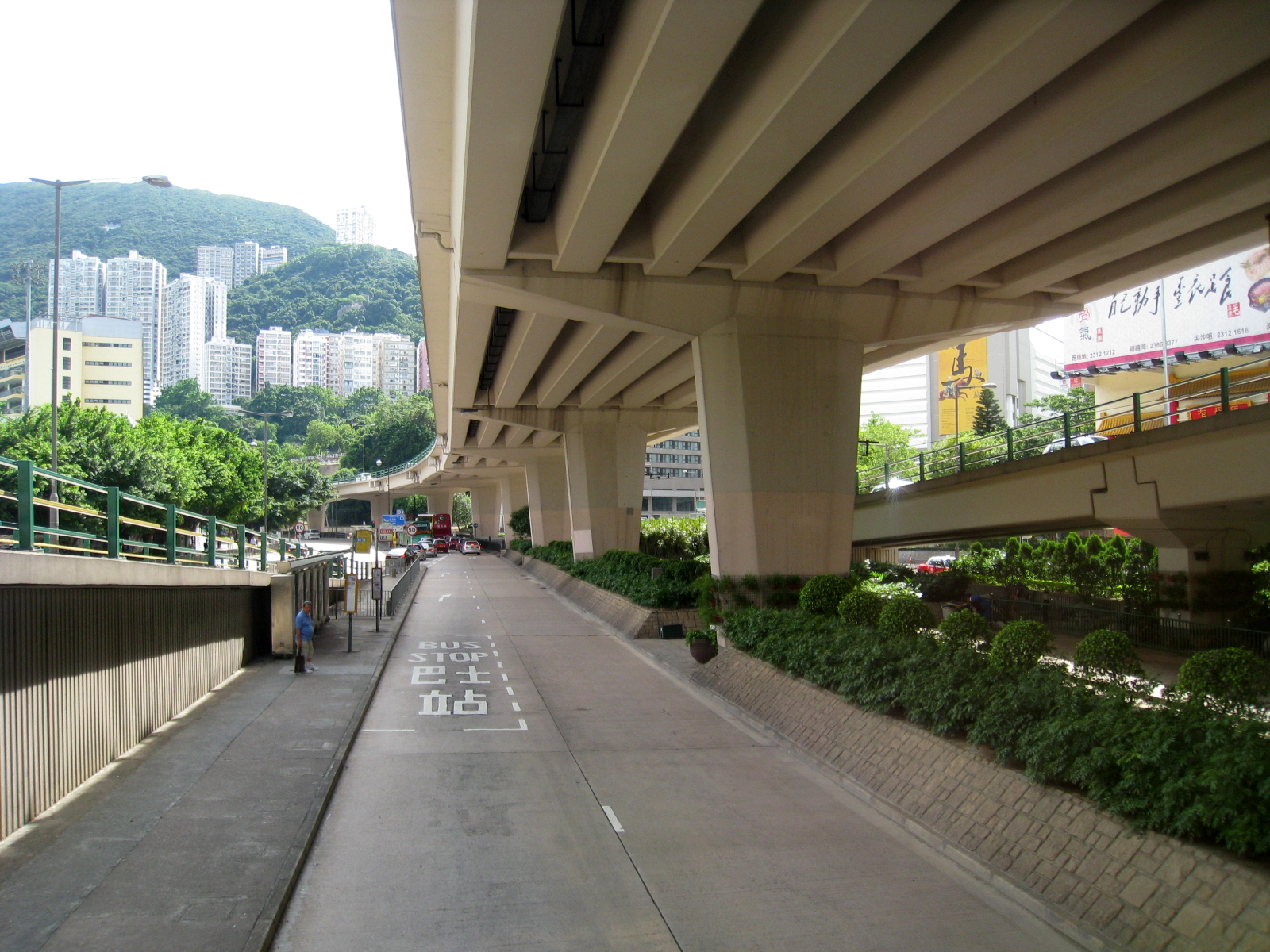
- Underneath Canal Road Flyover in August 2008
- Interactive map of Canal Road
- Native name: 堅拿道 (Yue Chinese)
- Location: Bowrington, Wan Chai District, Hong Kong

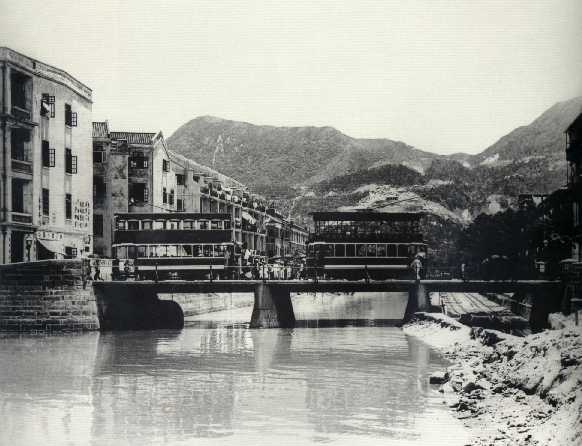
Trams crossing Bowrington Canal in the 1920s

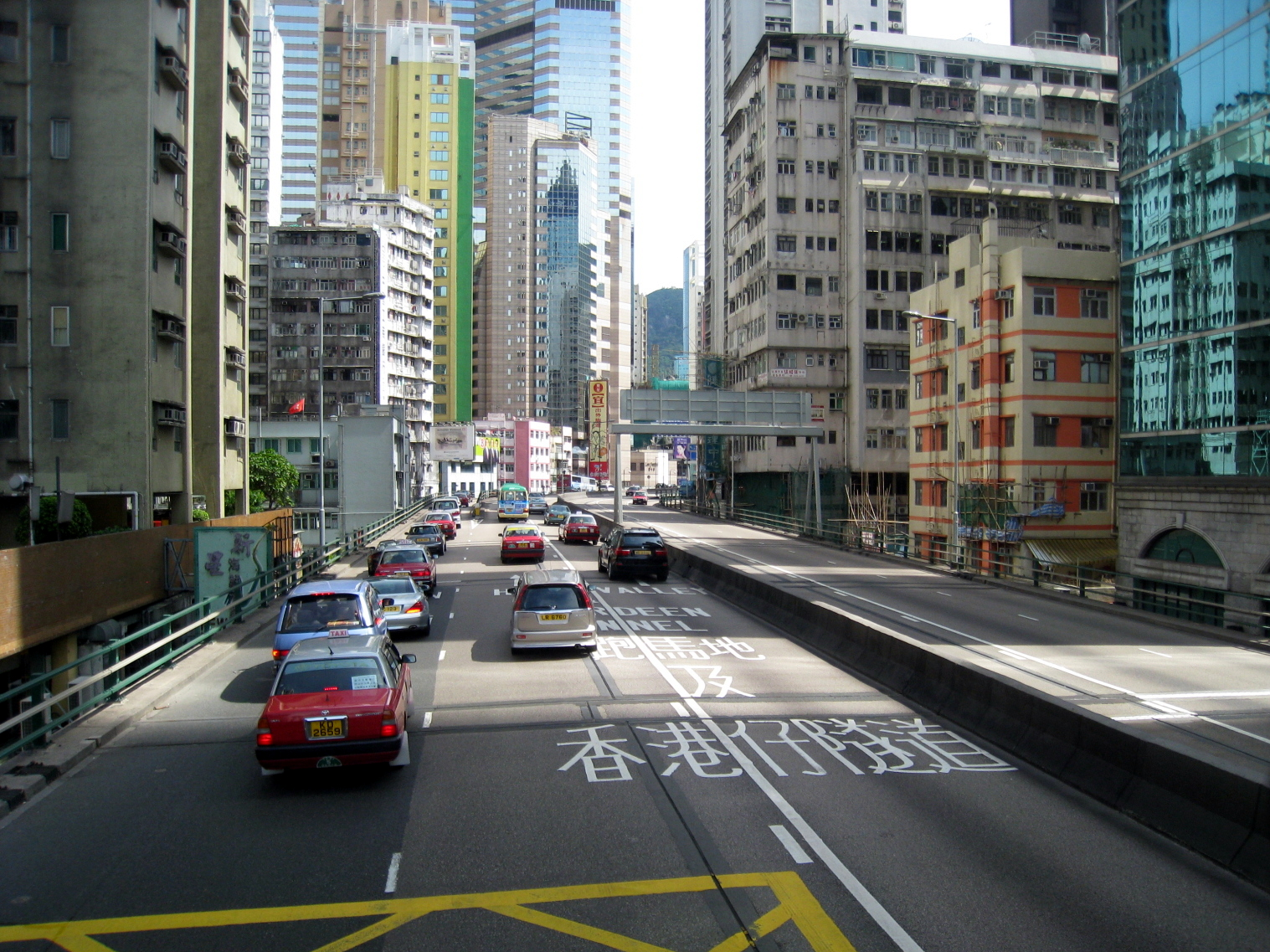
Traffic on Canal Road Flyover in August 2008

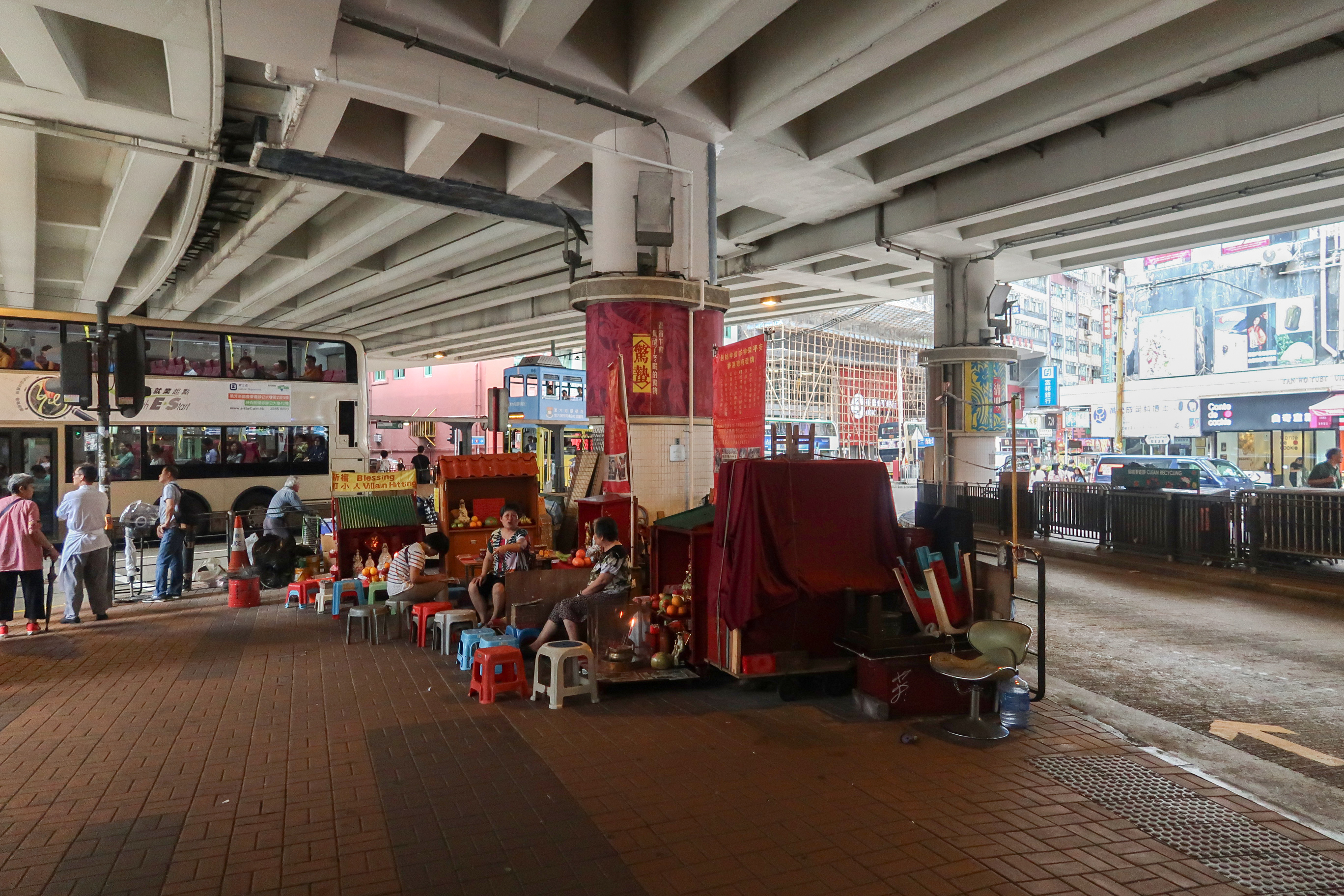
Villain hitter and her client under the Canal Road Flyover in Hong Kong in July 2018.

Canal Road East (Chinese: 堅拿道東), Canal Road West (堅拿道西) and the Canal Road Flyover (堅拿道天橋) are important roads in the Wan Chai District of Hong Kong Island, between the areas of East Point near Causeway Bay, and Morrison Hill near Wan Chai.

== History ==
Before urban development, the area was the estuary of the Wong Nai Chung river, which flowed through Happy Valley. The 4th Governor of Hong Kong, John Bowring, developed the estuary area, and built a town called Bowrington in honour of himself.

Bowrington Canal was built during the mid to late 1850s, and fed by the Wong Nai Chung river. Because the long and narrow canal resembled the neck of a goose it was known as Ngo Keng Kan (鵝頸澗; 'goose neck stream'). It was used by small vessels which were sufficiently low to pass under the various bridges along the route. The landmark Bowrington Bridge, built in 1861, was known as Ngo Keng Kiu (鵝頸橋; 'goose neck bridge') and carried the Hong Kong Tramways line across the waterway. The surrounding area of Bowrington is also known as Ngo Keng (鵝頸; 'goose neck').

The original wooden bridge which spanned the canal was replaced by an iron one that opened in March 1892. During the Praya East Reclamation Scheme, which created modern Wan Chai, the bridge was widened by 100 feet (30.5 metres) to accommodate a double line of tram tracks.

The canal was covered and made subterranean in the 1970s when the Canal Road Flyover was built. The names of the streets and the flyover are now the only reminder of the canal's existence.

== Canal Road Flyover ==
Canal Road Flyover (traditional Chinese: 堅拿道天橋; simplified Chinese: 坚拿道天桥; Jyutping: gin1naa4dou6tin1kiu4; Cantonese Yale: Gīnnàhdouh Tīnkìuh; pinyin: Jiānnádào Tiānqiáo) was built in the 1970s for the Cross-Harbour Tunnel, between Canal Road East and Canal Road West. When it opened to traffic on 29 March 1972, the flyover initially connected only Canal Road West to the north of Gloucester Road. Four years later, the flyover was expanded and extended south to the portal of Aberdeen Tunnel in Happy Valley (the extension is separately named Wong Nai Chung Gap Flyover).

Peter Hines was the Resident Civil Engineer for the construction of Happy Valley's 4-carriageway, 40-span-long viaduct with curved roads – and responsible for its opening in late 1980. He had warned that the wide, sloping roads would cause rainwater to flood the Happy Valley Racecourse and the Cross-Harbour Tunnel, resulting in the installation of flood tanks beneath the racecourse.

The flyover was expanded again, with an exit connecting it to Canal Road East.

The flyover currently connects Aberdeen Tunnel with the Cross-Harbour Tunnel. It is a crucial transport link for conveniently reaching the Southern District and Happy Valley. From the Wan Chai Interchange, the flyover passes the following thoroughfares (in order): Gloucester Road, Jaffe Road, Lockhart Road, Hennessy Road, Times Square, Sharp Street, Leighton Road, Queen's Road East and Wong Nai Chung Road.

The area beneath the flyover featured in the second installment of the Canadian television reality competition series The Amazing Race Canada, where the U-Turn of the third leg was located.

== Villain hitting ==
The area under the Canal Road Flyover, adjacent to Hennessy Road, is known for old ladies who offer villain hitting services, wherein personal enemies are cursed by beating pieces of paper representing them. The practice is especially popular during king chat (ging jat).

== See also ==
- List of streets and roads in Hong Kong

Preceded by Aberdeen Tunnel	Hong Kong Route 1 Canal Road Flyover	Succeeded by Cross-Harbour Tunnel
