= Fat Kwong Street =

Street in Ho Man Tin, Kowloon, Hong Kong

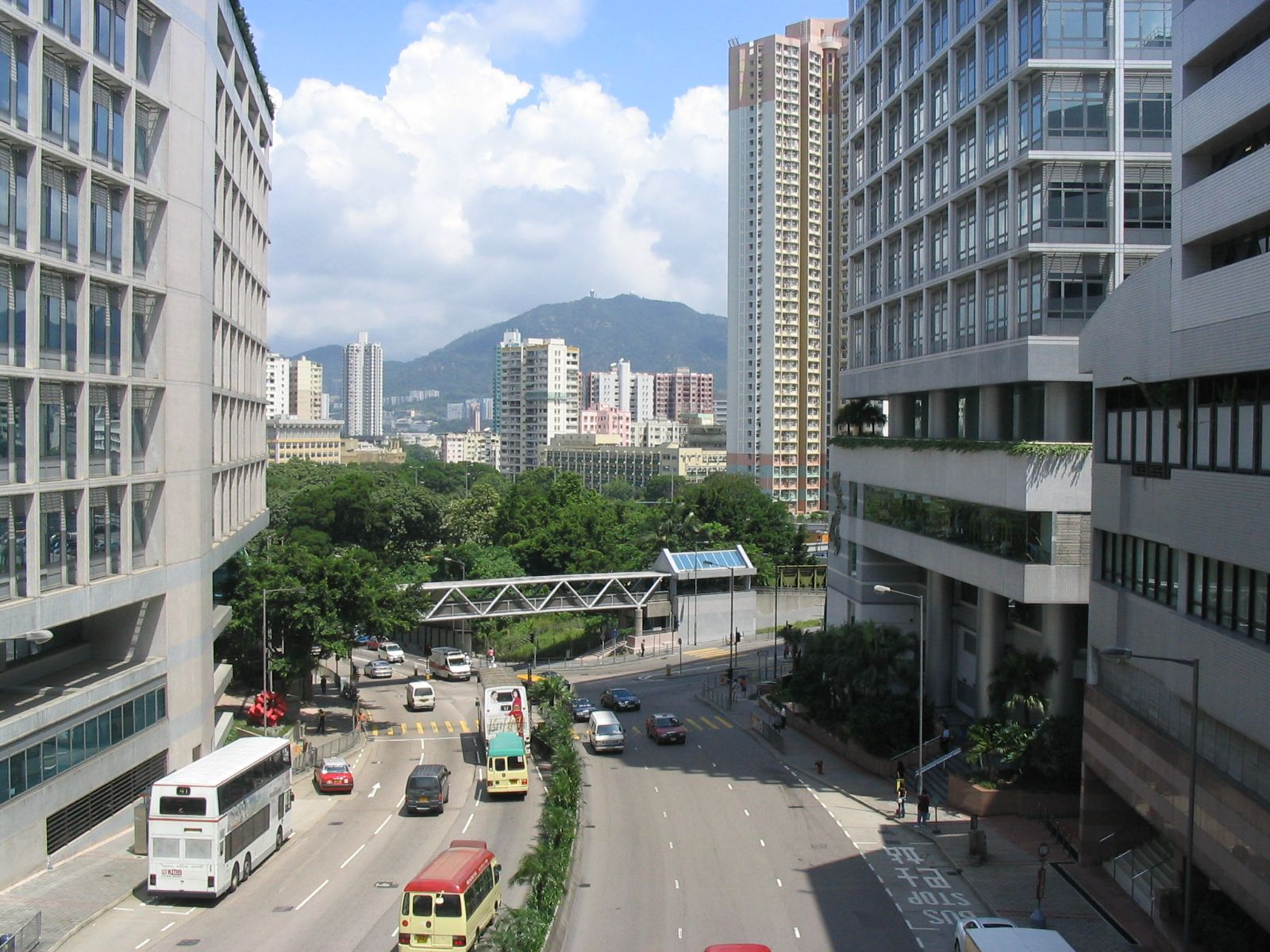
- Interactive map of Fat Kwong Street
- Native name: 佛光街 (Yue Chinese)
- Length: 1.45 km
- Location: Ho Man Tin, Kowloon, Hong Kong
- Coordinates: 22°18′44″N 114°10′55″E
- East: Hung Hom Road
- West: Pui Ching Road

Fat Kwong Street
- Chinese: 佛光街
Transcriptions
Standard Mandarin
- Hanyu Pinyin: Fóguāng Jiē
Yue: Cantonese
- Jyutping: fat6 gwong1 gaai1

Fat Kwong Street (Chinese: 佛光街) is a street in Ho Man Tin, Kowloon, Hong Kong.

== History ==
Fat Kwong Street was originally a short street in Hung Hom. In 1967, the government proposed to build a new road link between Hung Hom and Mong Kok via Ho Man Tin, by connecting Fat Kwong Street to Pui Ching Road. To facilitate this scheme, a flyover was built over Princess Margaret Road at a cost of around HK$2.1 million, which was completed in 1970. The new road link was constructed, in part, to serve major government housing developments in the Ho Man Tin area.

The eastern part of Fat Kwong Street was closed in September 1970 due to landslides. Major repairs were required, and the street did not reopen until June 1971.

== Description ==
Fat Kwong Street is approximately 1.45 km (0.90 mi) long, stretching from Princess Margaret Road to Ma Tau Wai Road. It is classified by the Hong Kong government as a district distributor road.

== Intersecting roads ==
West to east:

- Princess Margaret Road
- Pui Ching Road
- Sheung Shing Street
- Sheung Foo Street
- Sheung Lok Street
- Yan Fung Street
- Shun Yung Street
- Chatham Road North (Route 5)
- Wo Chung Street
- Ping Chi Street
- Ma Tau Wai Road
- Man Yue Street
- Man Lok Street
- Hung Hom Road
- Tai Wan Road East
