= Wong Chuk Hang Road =

Road in Hong Kong

Coordinates: 22.24867°N 114.16142°E

Wong Chuk Hang Road
- 黃竹坑道; Part of Route 1

Route information
- Maintained by Highways Department
- Length: 1.3 km (0.81 mi)
- History: Opened 1848; Named 4 August 1961

Major junctions
- West end: Aberdeen Praya Road
- 5 in total
- East end: Aberdeen Tunnel

Location
- Country: China
- Special administrative region: Hong Kong
- Districts: Southern
- Major cities: Wong Chuk Hang, Hong Kong

Highway system
- Transport in Hong Kong; Routes; Roads and Streets

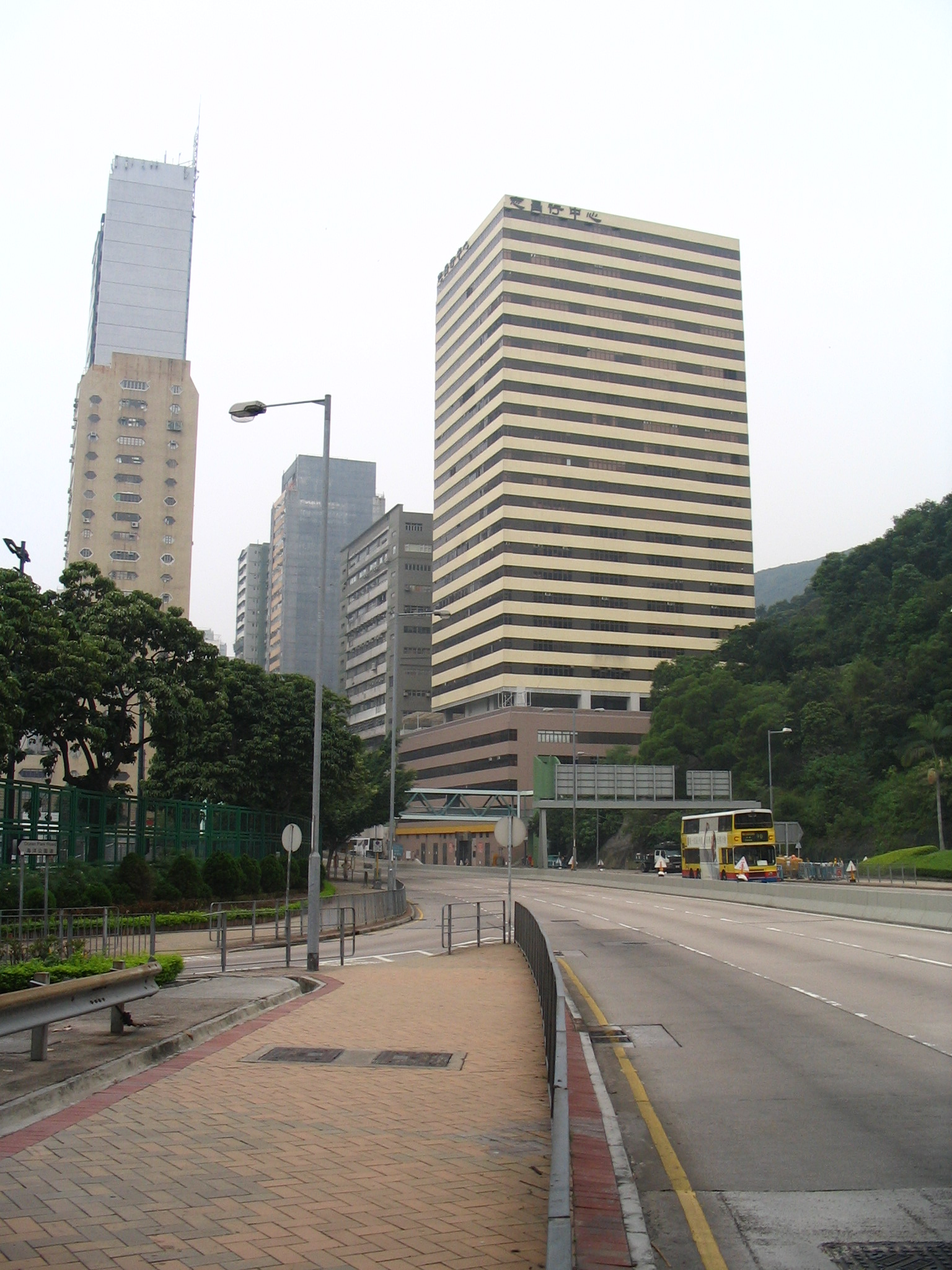
Junction of Ocean Park and Wong Chuk Hang Roads in September 2007.

Wong Chuk Hang Road (Chinese: 黃竹坑道; Jyutping: wong4 zuk1 haang1 dou6) is a major thoroughfare in Hong Kong Island. It is part of Hong Kong's Route 1. It is a 6-lane major thoroughfare.

Wong Chuk Hang Road connects Aberdeen Praya Road and Aberdeen Tunnel.

== Flyover ==
A flyover 550 metres (600 yd) long with 4 lanes passes over Wong Chuk Hang Road. The construction for the flyover cost 358 million Hong Kong dollars. Construction began in October 1998, and ended in December 2001.

== Interchanges ==
The section of Route 1 that runs through Wong Chuk Hang Road has 4 exits. They are numbered 1A, 2, 3, and 4. The entire road is in Wong Chuk Hang, Southern District.

Wong Chuk Hang Road
| km | Exit | Destinations | Notes |
| 0.0 | | Aberdeen Praya Road - Aberdeen | Southern terminus; end of Route 1 |
| 0.1 | 1 | Ap Lei Chau Bridge Road - Ap Lei Chau | Northbound exit and southbound entrance from and to Aberdeen Praya Road |
| 0.2 | 1A | Heung Yip Road | Southbound exit and entrance only |
| 0.7 | 2 | Nam Long Shan Road - Wong Chuk Hang | |
| 1.2 | 3 | Ocean Park Road - Ocean Park, Nam Long Shan | |
| 1.6 | 4 | Island Road / Nam Fung Road - Repulse Bay, Shouson Hill, Stanley; Wong Nai Chung Gap | Southbound exit and northbound entrance limited to only Island Road |
| 2.3 | | Aberdeen Tunnel - North Point, Central, Wan Chai, Kowloon & Causeway Bay | Happy Valley terminus; Route 1 continues |
1.000 mi = 1.609 km; 1.000 km = 0.621 mi: Incomplete access; Tolled; Route transition

| Preceded by Aberdeen Praya Road | Hong Kong Route 1 Wong Chuk Hang Road | Succeeded by Aberdeen Tunnel |
