= Aberdeen Tunnel =

Road tunnel in Hong Kong

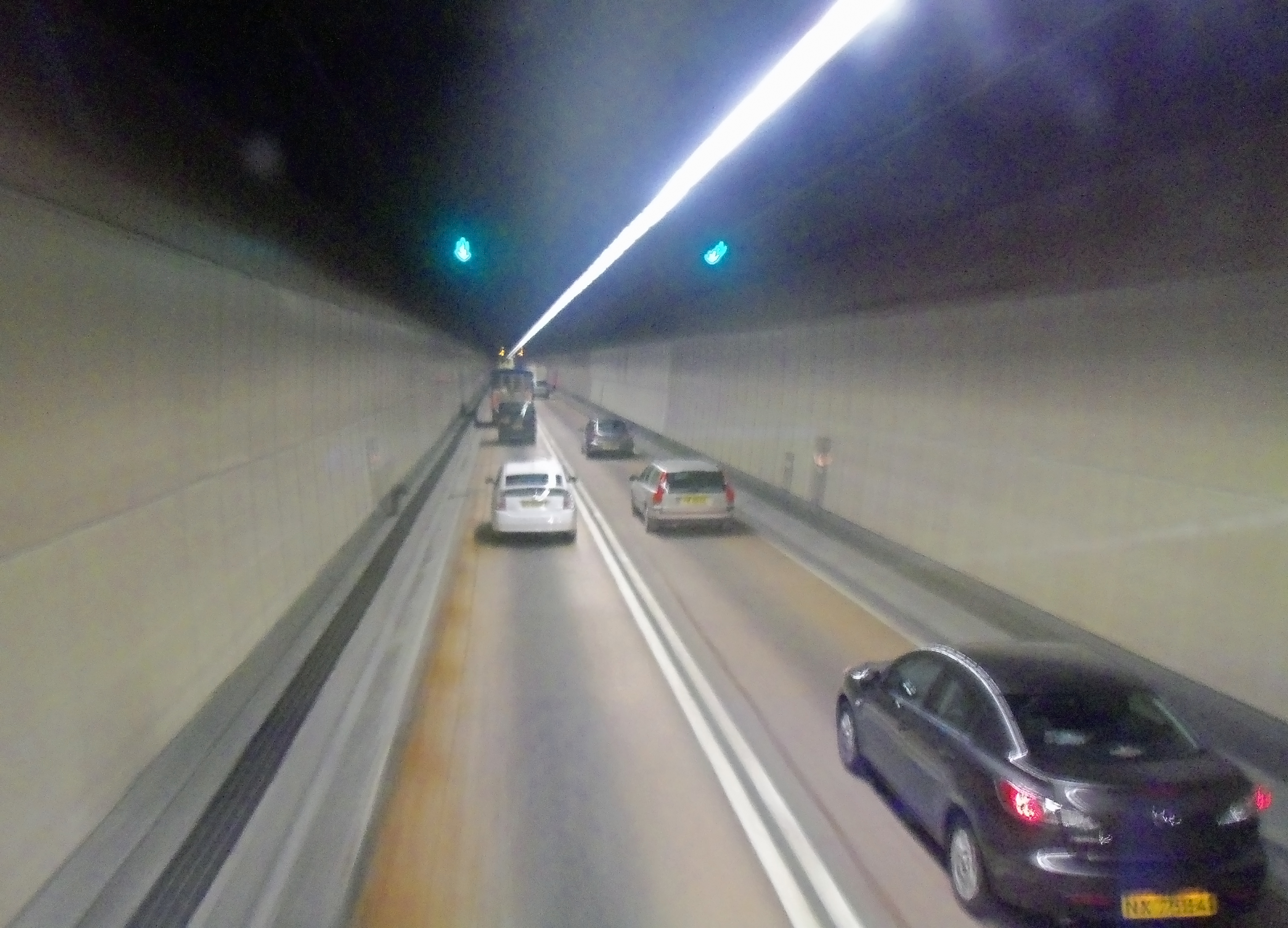
- Inside of northbound bore
- Interactive map of Aberdeen Tunnel

Overview
- Other name: 香港仔隧道
- Location: Hong Kong Island, Hong Kong
- Coordinates: 22.26086°N 114.18108°E
- Status: Active
- Route: Route 1
- Start: Wong Chuk Hang
- End: Happy Valley

Operation
- Opened: 12 March 1982; 44 years ago
- Owner: Hong Kong Link
- Operator: Transport Infrastructure Management Ltd.
- Traffic: Vehicular
- Character: Limited-access
- Toll: HK$8
- Vehicles per day: 64,114 (May 2015)

Technical
- Length: 1.9 kilometres (1.2 mi)
- No. of lanes: 4 lanes (2 lanes per direction)
- Operating speed: 70 kilometres per hour (43 mph)

Aberdeen Tunnel
- Chinese: 香港仔隧道
Transcriptions
Standard Mandarin
- Hanyu Pinyin: Xiāng gǎng zǎi suì dào
Yue: Cantonese
- Yale Romanization: Hēung góng jái seuih douh
- Jyutping: Hoeng1 gong2 zai2 soei6 dou6

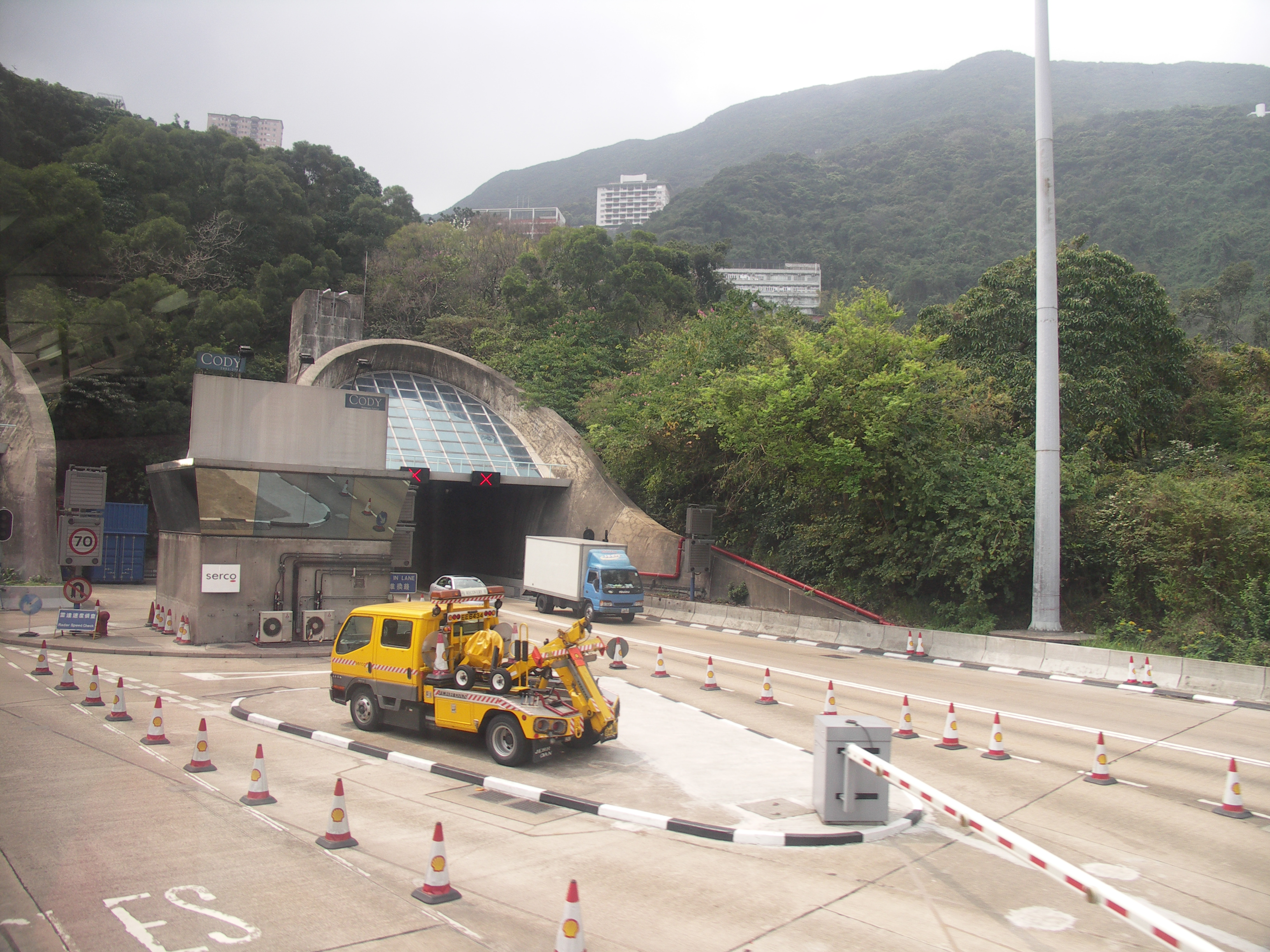
Aberdeen Tunnel, Happy Valley entrance

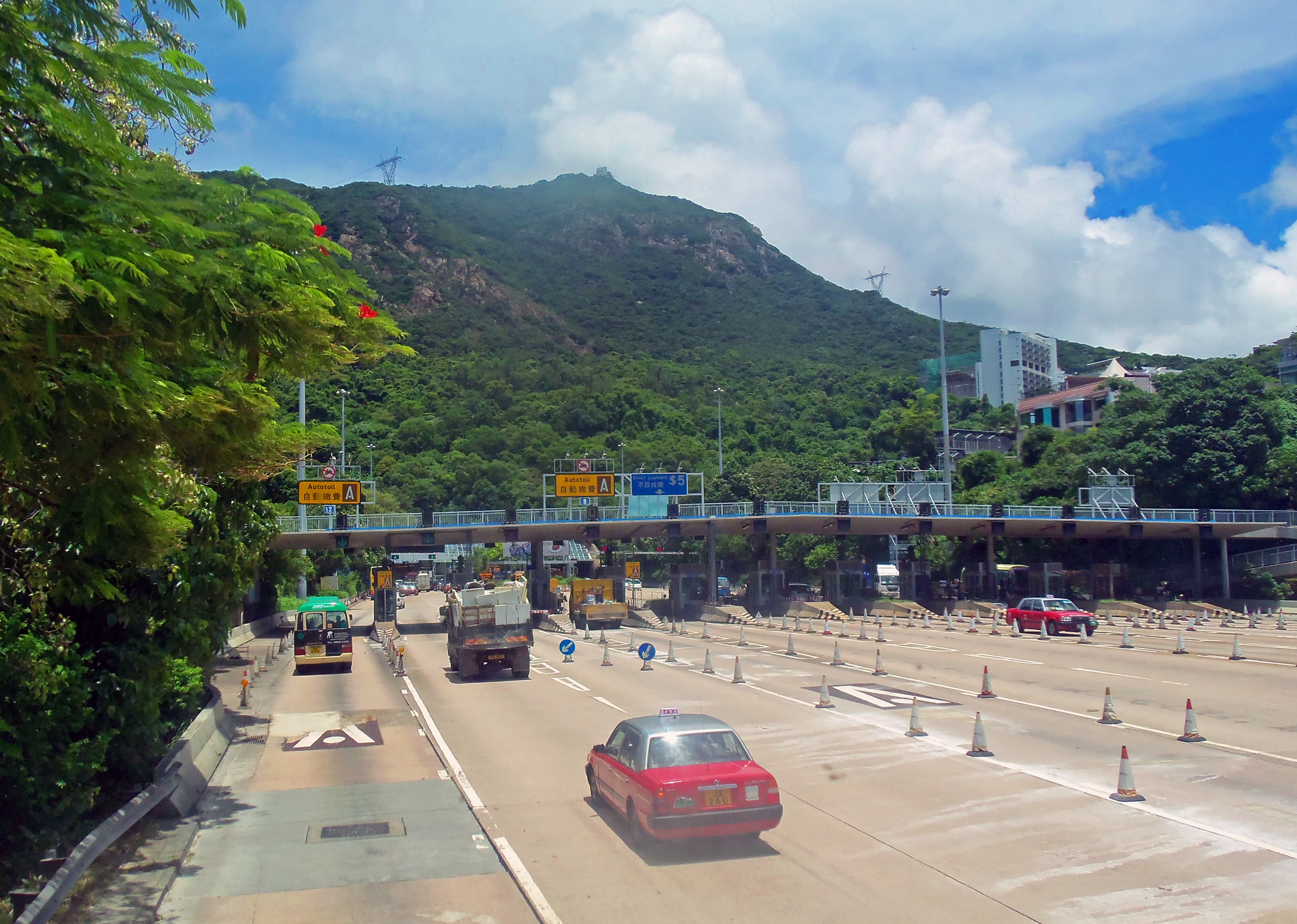
Toll plaza

Aberdeen Tunnel, part of Route 1, is a dual-carriageway tunnel linking Happy Valley and Wong Chuk Hang near Aberdeen on the Hong Kong Island, Hong Kong. It shortens the travel time between Wong Chuk Hang and Causeway Bay of the Hong Kong Island. It connects the Wong Chuk Hang Road and Canal Road Flyover in the Hong Kong Island.

The toll is HK$8. The tunnel is 1.9 kilometres (1.2 mi) long and was used by 64,114 vehicles daily in 2015. In 2023, 21.9 million vehicles used the tunnel.

Aberdeen Tunnel is currently managed by Transport Infrastructure Management Limited.

== History ==
A tunnel was planned in the long-term development plan for Aberdeen approved by the Governor-in-Council in 1964. Support for the tunnel grew following the closure of the Wong Nai Chung Gap by landslides. In 1970, Aberdeen kaifong leaders and industrialists called on the government to build the tunnel. A pilot tunnel was dug in the mid-1970s to examine underground rock conditions. Official approval for the full project, comprising the tunnel and the Canal Road flyover extension, was granted in late 1975. The opening of the tunnel was much delayed by both difficult tunnelling conditions, and the late arrival of communications equipment from overseas. The contractor was Dragages Hong Kong.

Around 1,000 graves in the Hong Kong Cemetery were relocated for the construction of the tunnel.

The tunnel opened on 12 March 1982. From the very beginning, the tunnel suffered from congestion at the approach roads. In 1991, the toll was raised from $3 to $5.

The Aberdeen Tunnel's operations and management were privatised in 1991. It was contracted out to the Cross Harbour Tunnel Company initially. Tunnel management was contracted out to Serco Group (HK) Ltd. on 29 September 1998, and then to Transport Infrastructure Management Ltd. on 29 September 2014.

Electronic tolling via HKeToll was introduced on 24 December 2023 following which the toll booths were demolished.

== Bus routes ==
As of 2017, there are 46 bus routes passing through the tunnel.

Most of them pass by the Aberdeen Tunnel Toll Plaza (香港仔隧道收費廣場) bus stop, where since 29 December 2019 you can get a transfer discount by transferring between two applicable bus routes. There is a similar discount at the Queen Mary Hospital bus stop. The discount scheme was branded as "New Bus-Bus Interchange Scheme - smart connection for Southern District" (香隧瑪麗轉一轉 省時便捷任你選; hoeng1 seoi6 maa5 lai6 zyun2 jat1 zyun2 saang2 si4 bin6 zit6 jam6 nei5 syun2; 'Aberdeen Tunnel Queen Mary Hospital') transfer buses – time saving and convenient for you to choose).

== Underground laboratory ==
The Aberdeen Tunnel Underground Laboratory between the two tunnel tubes was appended by the University of Hong Kong during construction. The laboratory facilitates particle physics research.

== Current developments ==
The South Island line, a new Mass Transit Railway (MTR) link that opened in December 2016, roughly parallels the Aberdeen Tunnel. Upon commissioning, it was expected that 7% of peak hour Aberdeen Tunnel traffic would divert to the new railway.

== See also ==
- List of tunnels and bridges in Hong Kong
- List of streets and roads in Hong Kong
- Wong Chuk Hang Kau Wai

Preceded by Wong Chuk Hang Road	Hong Kong Route 1 Aberdeen Tunnel	Succeeded by Canal Road Flyover
