= Princess Margaret Road =

Road in Kowloon, Hong Kong

Coordinates: 22.31336°N 114.17691°E

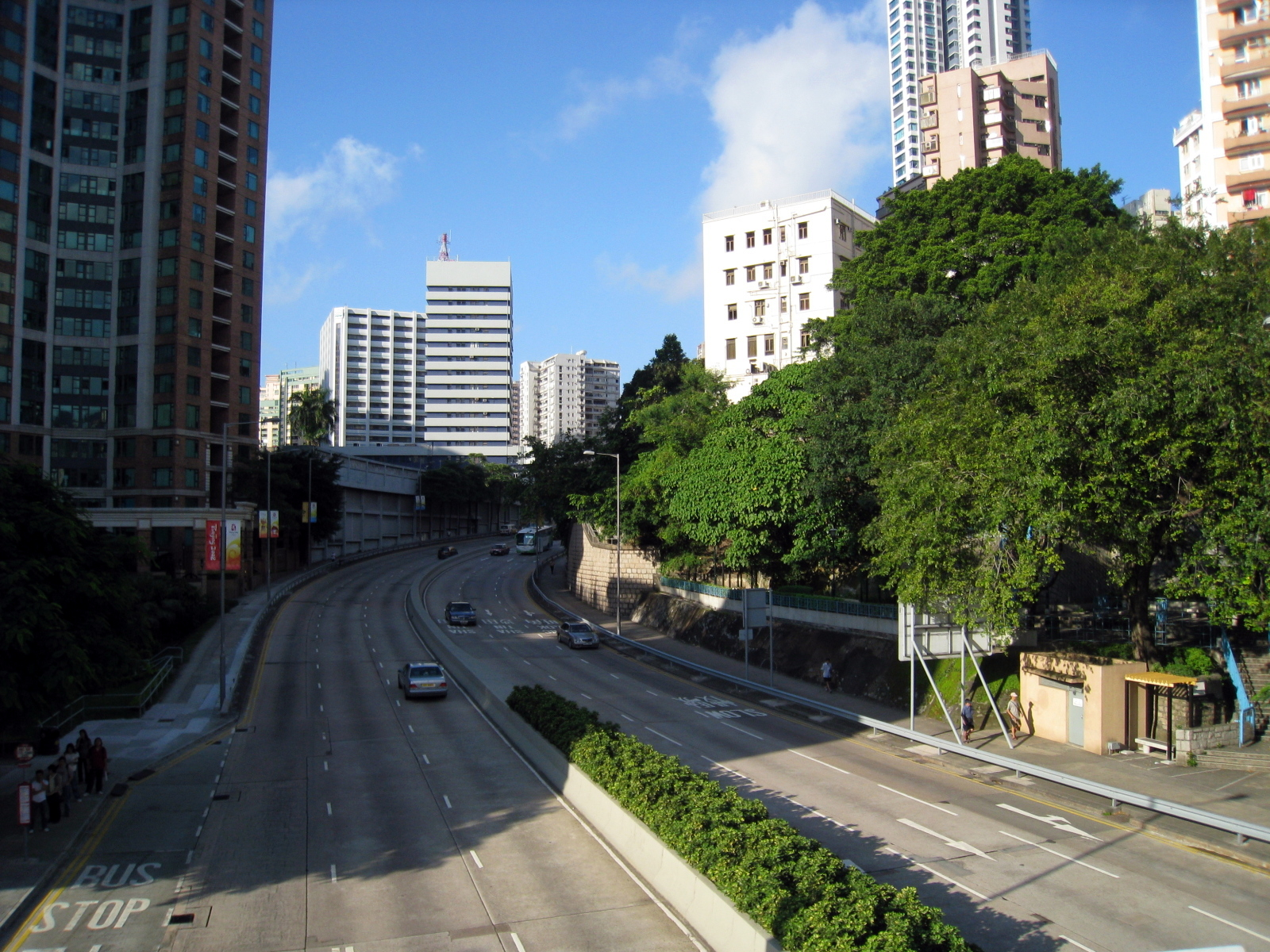
- Ho Man Tin section of Princess Margaret Road
- Native name: 公主道 (Yue Chinese)
- Length: 2.31 kilometres (1.44 mi)
- Location: Kowloon, Hong Kong
- South end: Chatham Road South
- North end: Waterloo Road

Princess Margaret Road
- Chinese: 公主道
- Literal meaning: Princess Road
Transcriptions
Standard Mandarin
- Hanyu Pinyin: Gōngzhǔ Dào
Yue: Cantonese
- Yale Romanization: gung1 jyu2 dou6
- Jyutping: gung1 zyu2 dou6

Nairn Road
- Chinese: 楠道
- Literal meaning: Nanmu Road
Transcriptions
Standard Mandarin
- Hanyu Pinyin: Nán Dào
Yue: Cantonese
- Jyutping: naam4 dou6

Princess Margaret Road (Chinese: 公主道; lit. "Princess Road") is a road in Kowloon, Hong Kong, forming a part of Route 1.

Originally called Nairn Road (楠道) with the English name after a town in Scotland and the Chinese name after the nanmu trees that grew there, the road was renamed to commemorate the 1966 visit to Hong Kong of Princess Margaret, Countess of Snowdon.

Princess Margaret Road starts near at Gascoigne Road, runs northward, cutting through the hills between Quarry Hill, No. 12 Hill and Ho Man Tin proper, and reaches the intersection of Argyle Street and Waterloo Road.

Depicted in the movie The Legend of Speed, it actually is a popular road for illegal street racing.

== See also ==
- List of streets and roads in Hong Kong

Preceded by Hong Chong Road	Hong Kong Route 1 Princess Margaret Road	Succeeded by Waterloo Road
