= Cross-Harbour Tunnel =

Tunnel crossing Victoria Harbour, Hong Kong

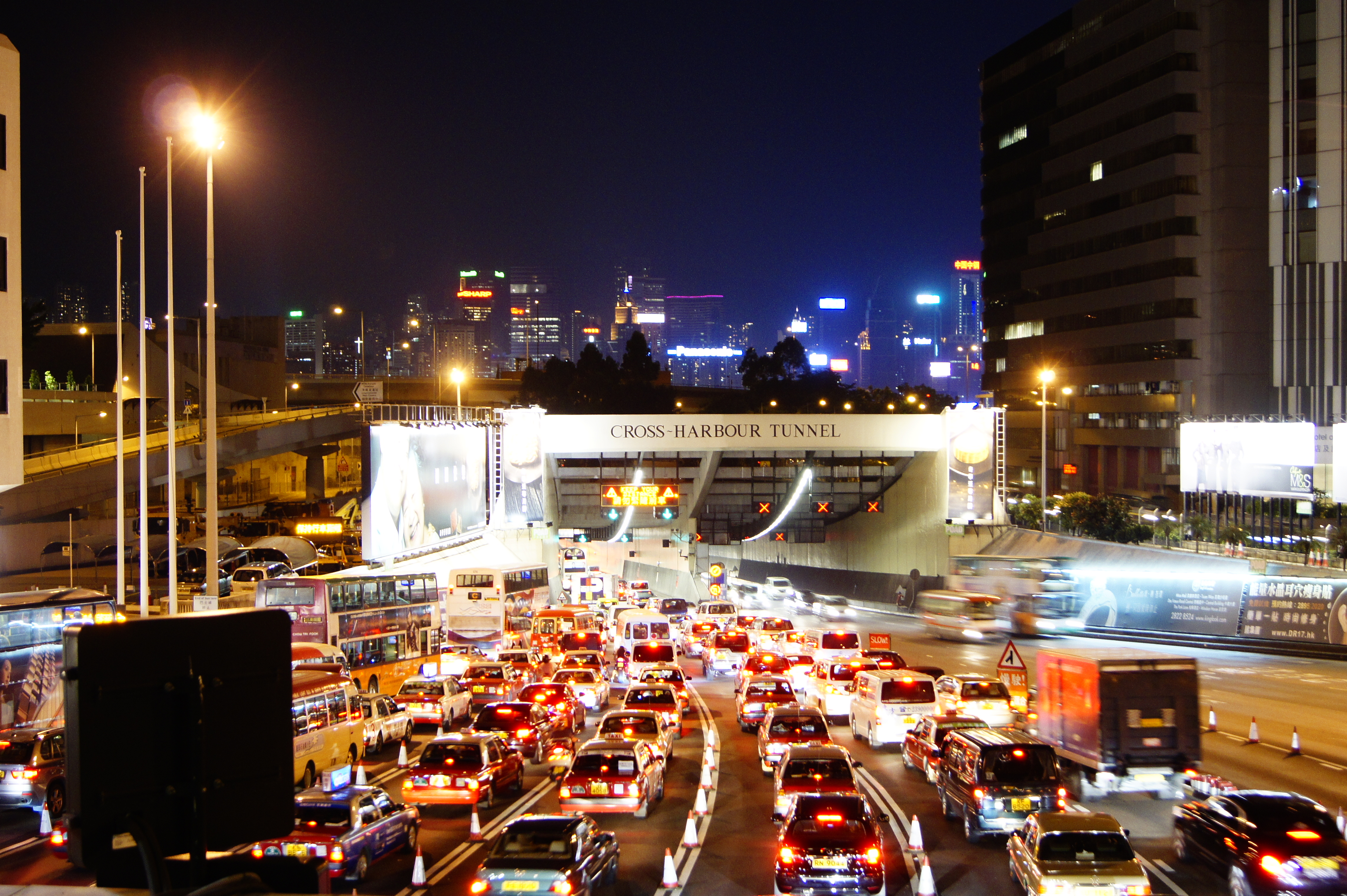
- Entrance to the tunnel in Hung Hom, Kowloon in September 2012
- Interactive map of Cross-Harbour Tunnel

Overview
- Location: Beneath Victoria Harbour, between Hung Hom Bay and Kellet Island
- Coordinates: 22°17′29″N 114°10′56″E
- Status: Active
- System: Part of Route 1
- Start: Hung Hom Bay, Kowloon (between Hong Chong Road and Salisbury Road)
- End: Kellet Island, Causeway Bay, Hong Kong Island (Canal Road Flyover)

Operation
- Opened: 2 August 1972; 53 years ago
- Owner: Hong Kong Government
- Operator: Chun Wo Tunnel Management Limited
- Traffic: Vehicular
- Vehicles per day: 116,754

Technical
- Length: 1.86 kilometres (1.16 mi)
- No. of lanes: 4 lanes (2 lanes per direction) in road tunnel with 3 lanes per direction on exit
- Operating speed: 70 kilometres per hour (43 mph) (within tunnel); 50 kilometres per hour (31 mph) (exit and entrance to tunnel)

Cross-Harbour Tunnel
- Chinese: 海底隧道
- Jyutping: Hoi2dai2 Seoi6dou6
- Literal meaning: Seabed tunnel
Transcriptions
Standard Mandarin
- Hanyu Pinyin: Hǎidǐ Suìdào
Yue: Cantonese
- Yale Romanization: Hóidái Seuihdouh
- Jyutping: Hoi2dai2 Seoi6dou6

Alternative Chinese name
- Traditional Chinese: 紅磡海底隧道
- Simplified Chinese: 红磡海底隧道
- Jyutping: Hung4ham3 Hoi2dai2 Seoi6dou6
- Literal meaning: Hung Hom seabed tunnel
Transcriptions
Standard Mandarin
- Hanyu Pinyin: Hóngkàn Hǎidǐ Suìdào
Yue: Cantonese
- Yale Romanization: Hùhngham Hóidái Seuihdouh
- Jyutping: Hung4ham3 Hoi2dai2 Seoi6dou6

The Cross-Harbour Tunnel (abbreviated CHT or XHT) is the first tunnel in Hong Kong built underwater. It consists of two steel road tunnels, each with two lanes constructed using the single shell immersed tube method.

It is the earliest of three vehicular harbour crossings in Hong Kong, opened for traffic in 1972. It was constructed under a 30-year private-sector franchise based on a build–operate–transfer (BOT) model, and the title passed to the Hong Kong government in 1999 upon termination of the franchise. It has become one of the most congested roads in Hong Kong and the world, with 116,753 vehicles passing through it daily in 2013.

== History ==
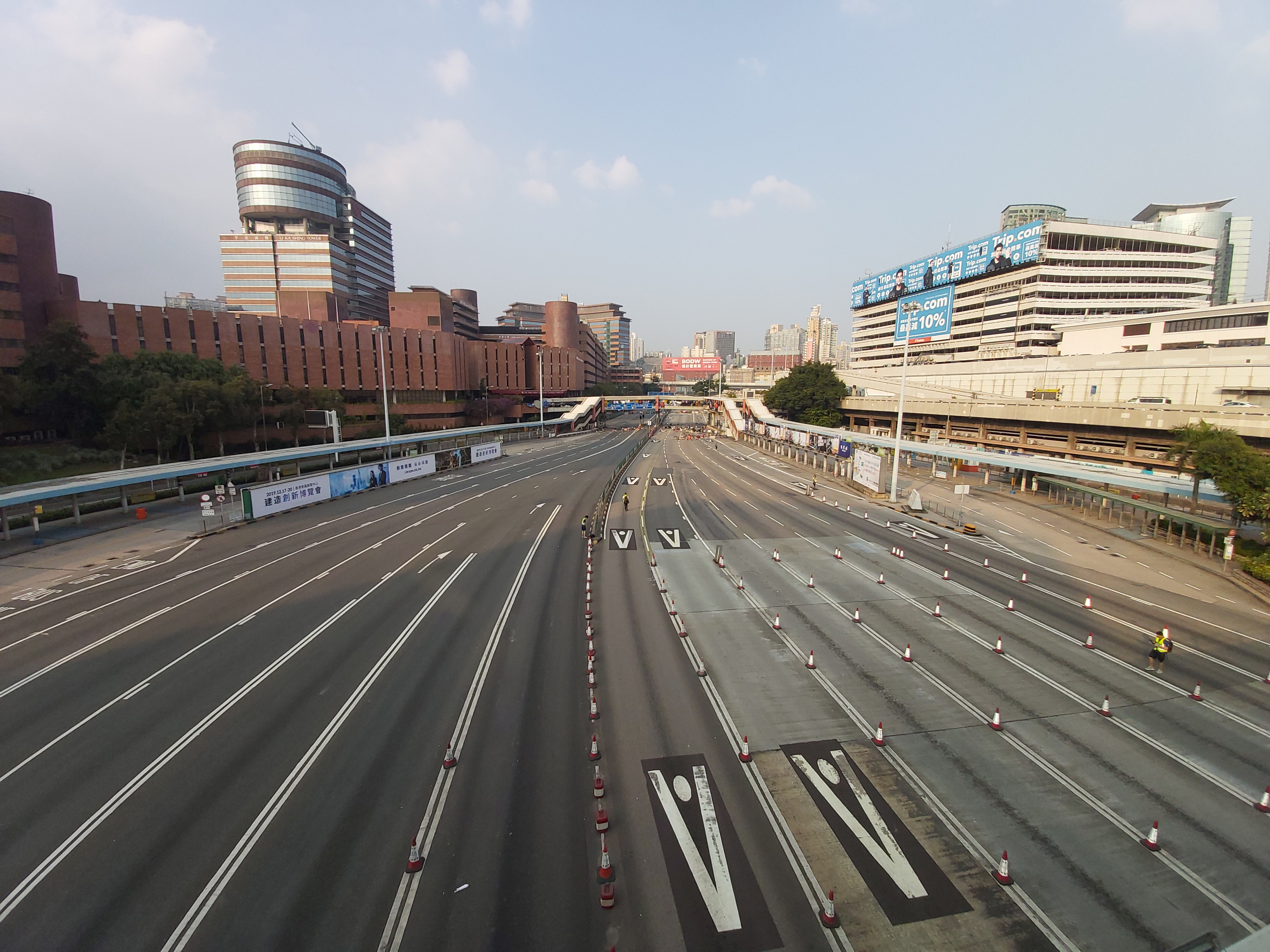
Cross-Harbour Tunnel was completely suspended during protest in November 2019

The Hong Kong government used the BOT model for the implementation of the tunnel project; financing and construction was the responsibility of a private enterprise, which was granted a concession to operate and collect tolls for 30 years. The concession was given to the then Cross-Harbour Tunnel Company Limited (Chinese: 香港隧道有限公司), today the Cross-Harbour Holdings Limited (港通控股有限公司), which was founded in 1965 to carry out the tunnel project. The Hong Kong government participated to the tune of 20% in order not to fully hand over their influence on the project. The tunnel was designed with two lanes in each direction for a capacity of 80,000 vehicles. The project was structurally managed jointly by the British engineering firms Scott Wilson Kirkpatrick & Partners and Freeman Fox & Partners. The tunnel links the main financial and commercial districts on both sides of Victoria Harbour, connecting Kellett Island (a former island now connected to Hong Kong Island by reclamation), with a reclaimed site on the western side of Hung Hom Bay, Kowloon, off then Hong Kong Technical College. The toll plaza is located at the Hung Hom end of the tunnel, and has 14 toll booths. It provides the first road link and the first link for land transport between Kowloon and Hong Kong Island. Prior to the opening of the tunnel, cross-harbour vehicular traffic depended on ferries and for passengers, the Star Ferry. The project was joint-engineered by Scott Wilson Kirkpatrick & Partners and Freeman Fox & Partners.

Construction began in September 1969 and was to last four years. The concession period ran from the start of construction, and the operator accordingly completed the construction one year faster than planned. On 2 August 1972, the tunnel was opened for traffic, charging HK$5 per car crossing. After just three and a half years of operation, the operator had recouped the construction costs.

In 1984, the Hong Kong Government introduced a tax in addition to the operator's toll to make the overcrowded tunnel less priced. The price for a car transit was now HK$10.

In 1993, an electronic toll collection system was installed. Together with measures to control the flow of traffic, the vehicle capacity could be increased.

It was administered by The Cross-Harbour Tunnel Company Ltd until August 1999, when the operation franchise agreement expired and the government assumed control. From 1 November 2010, the tunnel was managed, operated and maintained by Serco on a contract basis. The tunnel was then operated by Chun Wo Tunnel Management Limited, which was awarded a contract lasting from 2016 to 2022. On 1 November 2022, Serco took over from Chun Wo Tunnel Management Limited.

The 2017 Hong Kong action film Shock Wave, starring Andy Lau, set its main plot in the tunnel.

In November 2019, Hong Kong protesters set roadblocks across the northern tunnel entrance and set fire to tollbooths, as many roads around the Polytechnic University were blocked, leading to the closure of the tunnel for a dozen of days.

=== Fees ===
	Initial (1972)	From 1984	From 1992	From 1999	From 23 July 2023
Private car	$5	$10	$10	$20	$30
Taxi	$5	$10	$10	$10	$25
Light goods vehicle (LGV)	$10	$15	$15	$15	$50
Heavy goods vehicle (HGV)	$20	$25	$30	$30	$70
Source: Consultancy report, Transport Department

As of October 2011, the tunnel generated approximately HK$700 million in annual toll revenue.

In 2023, manual toll collectors have been phased out with HKeToll, an electronic toll collection service introduced by the Transport Department. Cash and Octopus Cards are no longer be accepted for payment, and the toll booths have been removed from the entrances of the tunnel.

== Transport ==
As of 2018, there are 44 bus routes passing through the tunnel.

== Gallery ==
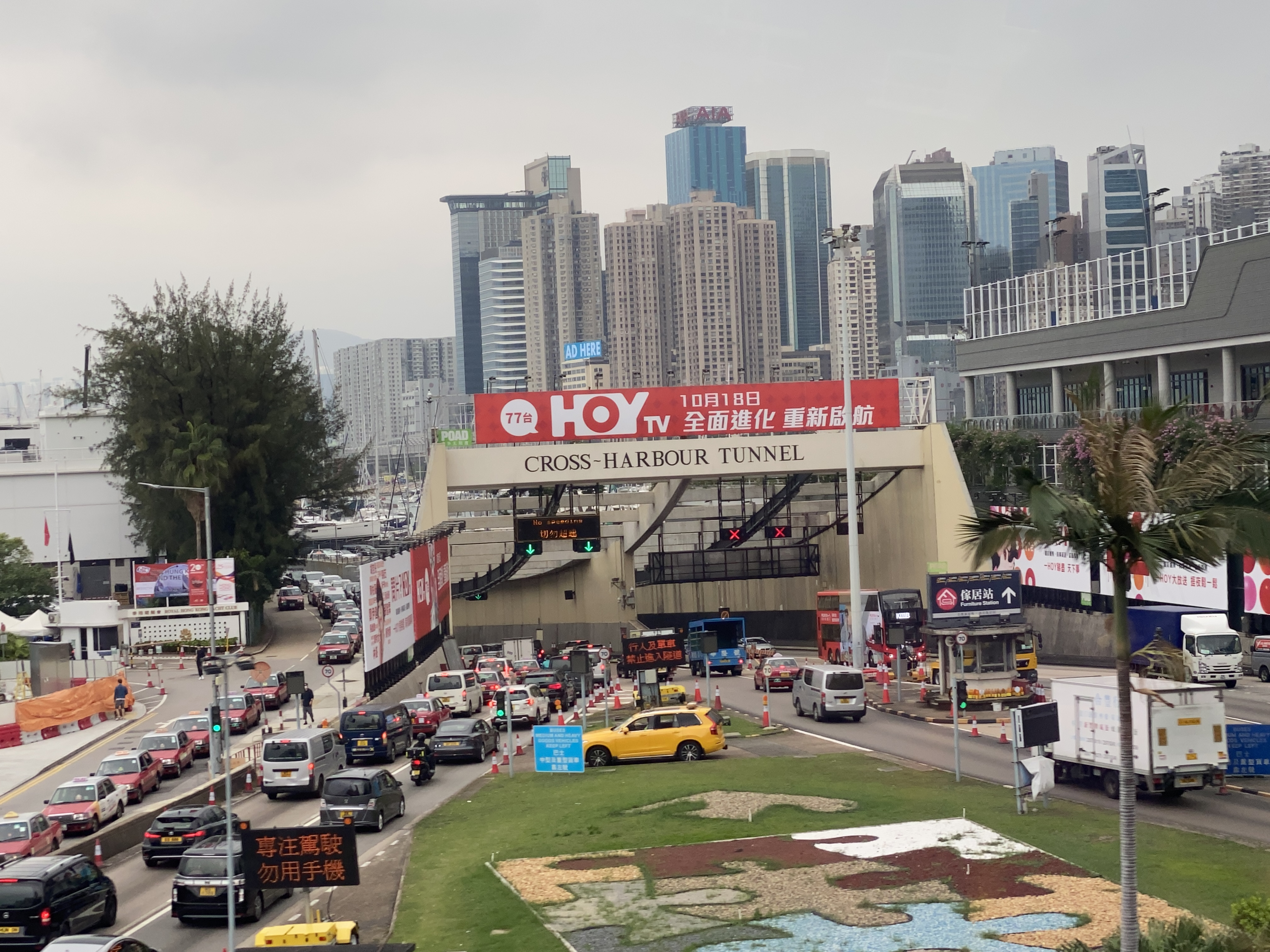
Cross-Harbour tunnel entrance seen from Causeway Bay, November 2022.

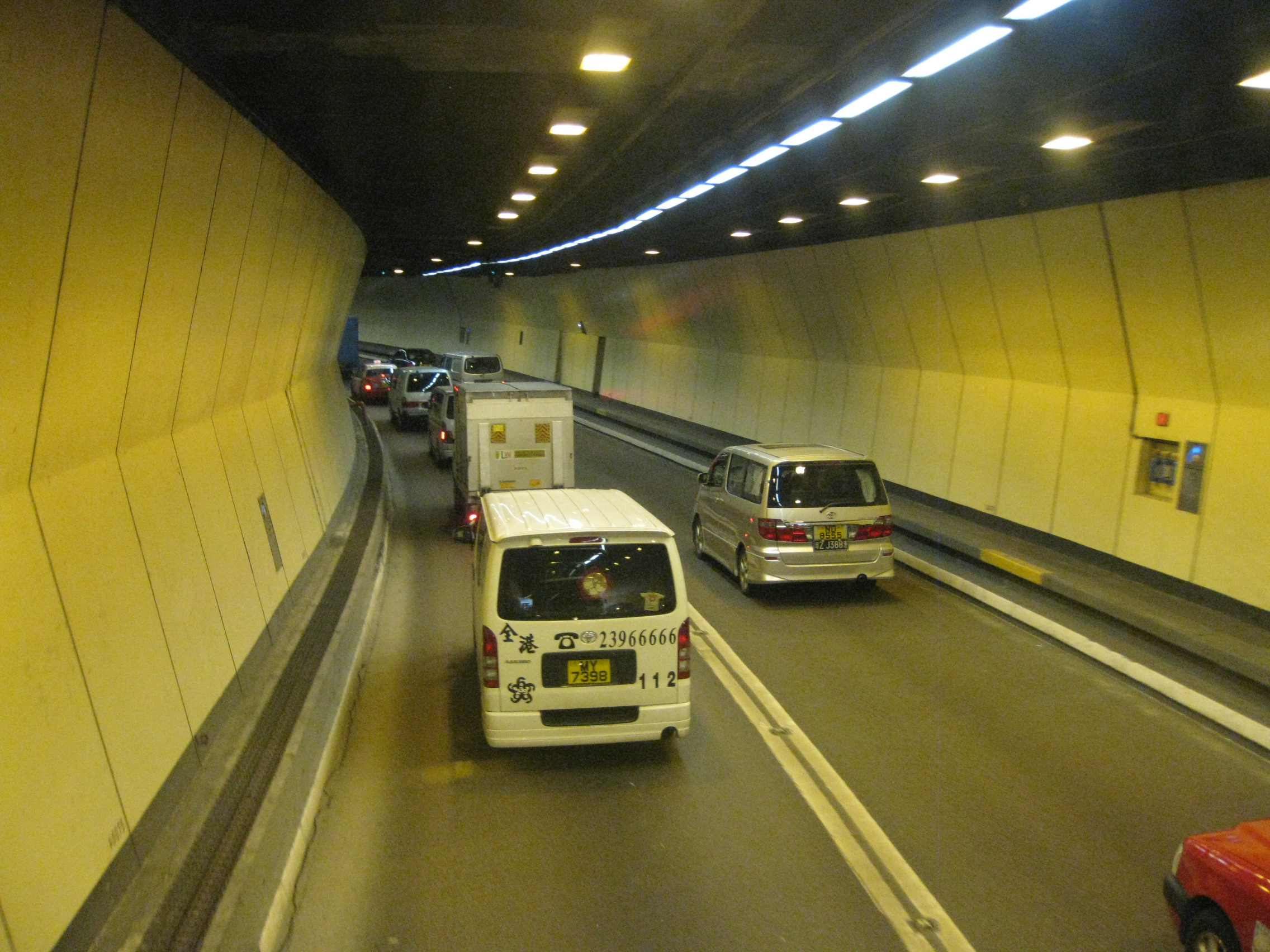
Inside the Kowloon-bound tunnel, 2013

== See also ==
- Vehicular harbour crossings in Hong Kong
- List of tunnels and bridges in Hong Kong
- Megaproject

Preceded by Canal Road Flyover	Hong Kong Route 1 Cross-Harbour Tunnel	Succeeded by Hong Chong Road
