= Mothballing =

Mothballing may refer to:

- Aircraft boneyard
- Mothballs
- Mothballed railway
- Reserve fleet
