= Route 11 (Hong Kong) =

Road in Hong Kong

Route 11

- Alignment and exits of proposed Route 11, gazetted sections only (zoom in to view exit details)

Route information
- Maintained by Highways Department
- Length: 20 km (12 mi) (approximate)
- Status: Planned

Major junctions
- South end: Route 8 Tsing Sha Highway (Stonecutters Bridge) (Proposed)
- Route 8 North Lantau Highway (Planned); Route 9 Tuen Mun Road; Route 9 Yuen Long Highway
- North end: Route 10 Kong Sham Western Highway

Location
- Country: China
- Special administrative region: Hong Kong
- Districts: Tuen Mun, Tsuen Wan, Kwai Tsing (proposed)

Highway system
- Transport in Hong Kong; Routes; Roads and Streets
← Route 10	→ Route 1

Route 11 (Chinese: 十一號幹綫) is a planned trunk route in Hong Kong numbered under the Hong Kong Strategic Route and Exit Number System. It is planned to be opened to vehicular traffic in its entirety (excluding the proposed Lantau - Tsing Yi Link) by 2033, and no later than 2036. Route 11 is the culmination of various cancelled or modified plans such as the Tuen Mun Bypass and the original alignment of Route 10.

When completed, it will be approximately 20 kilometres in length, linking Lantau with the Northwest New Territories including the proposed Hung Shui Kiu New Town. The route was proposed to alleviate the expected increase in traffic demand from the Hung Shui Kiu and Ha Tsuen New Development Areas (NDAs), while also reducing congestion on other road links between the New Territories and Kowloon, such as Tuen Mun Road, Yuen Long Highway, Ting Kau Bridge, Lantau Link, and Tai Lam Tunnel. The new route will also improve infrastructure resilience in the region by providing an alternative route in the event of an emergency which may disrupt traffic on other roads.

The construction of Route 11 will be a technically difficult project, involving the construction of four tunnels, including the Lam Tei and Tai Lam Chung Tunnels, and the Tsing Lung suspension bridge. A further two tunnels and two bridges will be built if the proposed Tsing Yi - Lantau Link is carried forward. The So Kwun Wat Link Road will also be constructed alongside Route 11, creating a link between Route 11 and Route 9 in between the Tai Lam Chung and Lam Tei Tunnels at So Kwun Wat.

In the future, Route 11 may serve as an important link for the Lantau Tomorrow Vision, specifically the proposed Hong Kong Island-Northeast Lantau (HKI-NEL) Link.

== History ==
The feasibility study for Route 11 between Yuen Long and North Lantau commenced in May 2018 and has since been completed. The Investigation Study including the examination of alignments and Environmental Impact Assessment is in progress. Detailed designs are still being made and no construction has started yet.

== Exits and junctions ==
The Highways Department has released a preliminary alignment of Route 11 which details the proposed exits and junctions.

District	Location	Destinations	Notes
Kwai Tsing	Ma Wan Channel	Tsing Yi - Lantau Link	Proposed
Tsuen Wan	Ng Kwu Leng	Route 8 North Lantau Highway — Tung Chung, Airport, Tsing Yi	Planned
Tsuen Wan	Tsing Lung Tau	Tsing Lung Bridge	Planned
Tsuen Wan	Tsing Lung Tau	Route 9 Tuen Mun Road — Tai Lam, Siu Lam, Sam Shing, Tsing Yi, Tsuen Wan, Sha Tin, Yuen Long (East), Lok Ma Chau	Planned
Tsuen Wan	Tai Lam	Tai Lam Chung Tunnel	Planned
Tuen Mun	So Kwun Wat	So Kwun Wat Link Road to Route 9 Tuen Mun Road — Tuen Mun, Lung Kwu Tan, Tung Chung, Airport	Planned
Tuen Mun	Lam Tei	Lam Tei Tunnel	Planned
Tuen Mun	Lam Tei	Route 9 Yuen Long Highway and Route 10 Kong Sham Western Highway — Lam Tei, Siu Hong, Hung Shui Kiu, Tin Shui Wai, Yuen Long (West), Ha Tsuen, Shenzhen Bay	Planned
