= Yuen Long Highway =

Road in Hong Kong

Coordinates: 22.43485°N 114.024762°E

Yuen Long Highway
- Part of Route 9

Route information
- Maintained by Highways Department
- Length: 10.0 km (6.2 mi)
- Existed: 1 July 1993–present

Major junctions
- East end: Kam Tin (near Au Tau)
- 6; Route 3 at Au Tau; Route 10 at Lam Tei
- West end: Tuen Mun (near Fu Tei)

Location
- Country: China
- Special administrative region: Hong Kong

Highway system
- Transport in Hong Kong; Routes; Roads and Streets

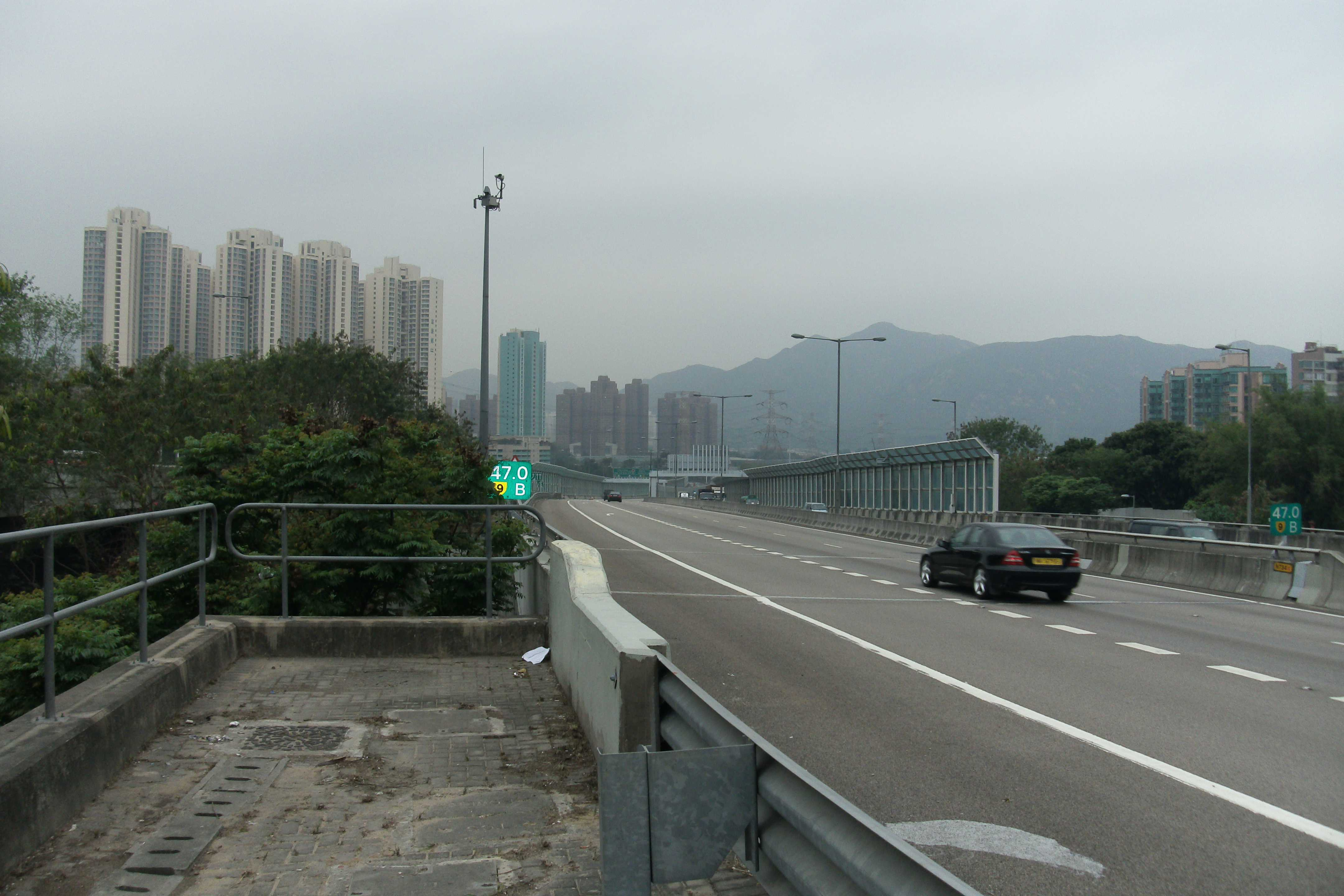
Yuen Long Highway in the direction of Tuen Mun

Yuen Long Highway (Chinese: 元朗公路; Jyutping: jyun4 long5 gung1 lou6) is a Hong Kong expressway connecting Au Tau in Yuen Long and Lam Tei in Tuen Mun of New Territories.

Part of Route 9, it bypasses Yuen Long Town and the rural areas of Lam Tei, Hung Shui Kiu and Ping Shan, providing a continuation of Tuen Mun Road to Yuen Long District.

== History ==
Yuen Long Highway was completed in phases. The section known as "Yuen Long to Tuen Mun Eastern Corridor" during planning stage, which links the Lam Tei and Tong Yan San Tsuen interchanges, was opened on 1 July 1993. This was followed by the "Yuen Long Southern Bypass" between Tong Yan San Tsuen and Pok Oi Hospital by way of the Shap Pat Heung Interchange, the construction of which started in 1992 and finished in December 1994.

The opening of the Tai Lam Tunnel in 1998 brought additional traffic flows to Yuen Long Highway, causing congestion around the Pok Oi Interchange. A dual two-lane vehicular bridge was therefore constructed above the interchange with a view to easing the traffic volume channelling through the roundabout. With the opening of Pok Oi Flyover on 5 February 1999, vehicles travelling between Yuen Long Highway and Tai Lam Tunnel or San Tin Highway no longer have to enter the roundabout at Pok Oi Interchange.

In order to accommodate the expected traffic from Route 10 cross-border corridor to and from Shekou/Dongjiaotou in Shenzhen over Deep Bay, the road had been finished upgrading to a dual 3-lane carriageway from its original dual 2-lane carriageway in February 2006.

== Interchanges ==
Yuen Long Highway
Location	km	Interchange name	Exit	Destinations	Notes
Au Tau	38.2	Au Tau Interchange		San Tin Highway – Lok Ma Chau, Sheung Shui	Northern terminus; Route 9 continues.
Au Tau	39.2	Au Tau Interchange	12	Route 3 ( Tsing Long Highway) – Tsuen Wan, Kowloon	Northbound exit and southbound entrance
Au Tau	39.9	Pok Oi Interchange	13	Castle Peak Road – Yuen Long – Yuen Long	Southbound exit and northbound entrance Reverse direction traffic exit via Shap Pat Heung Interchange
Shap Pat Heung	41.0	Shap Pat Heung Interchange		Shap Pat Heung Road / Tai Kei Leng Road – Yuen Long (South), Tai Tong	
Shap Pat Heung	43.2	Tong Yan San Tsuen Interchange	14	Long Tin Road (Yuen Long West Link) – Yuen Long (West), Tin Shui Wai (East)	
Hung Shui Kiu	44.6	Tin Shui Wai West Interchange	15	Hung Tin Road – Hung Shui Kiu, Tin Shui Wai (West), Wetland Park	
Lam Tei	46.6	Lam Tei Interchange	16	Route 10 ( Kong Sham Western Highway) – Shenzhen Bay	
Fu Tei	47.6	Lam Tei Interchange	17	Castle Peak Road – Lingnan – Fu Tei, University; Castle Peak Road – Lam Tei – Lam Tei; Tsing Lun Road – Tuen Mun (West)	Southbound exit and northbound entrance
Fu Tei	48.1	Lam Tei Interchange		Tuen Mun Road – Tuen Mun Town, Kowloon	Southern terminus; Route 9 continues.
1.000 mi = 1.609 km; 1.000 km = 0.621 mi: Route transition

== See also ==
- List of expressways in Hong Kong

Preceded by San Tin Highway	Hong Kong Route 9 Yuen Long Highway	Succeeded by Tuen Mun Road
