= Route 10 (Hong Kong) =

Road in Hong Kong

Coordinates: 22.43854°N 113.985339°E

Route 10

- Alignment and exits of Route 10 (zoom in to view exit details)

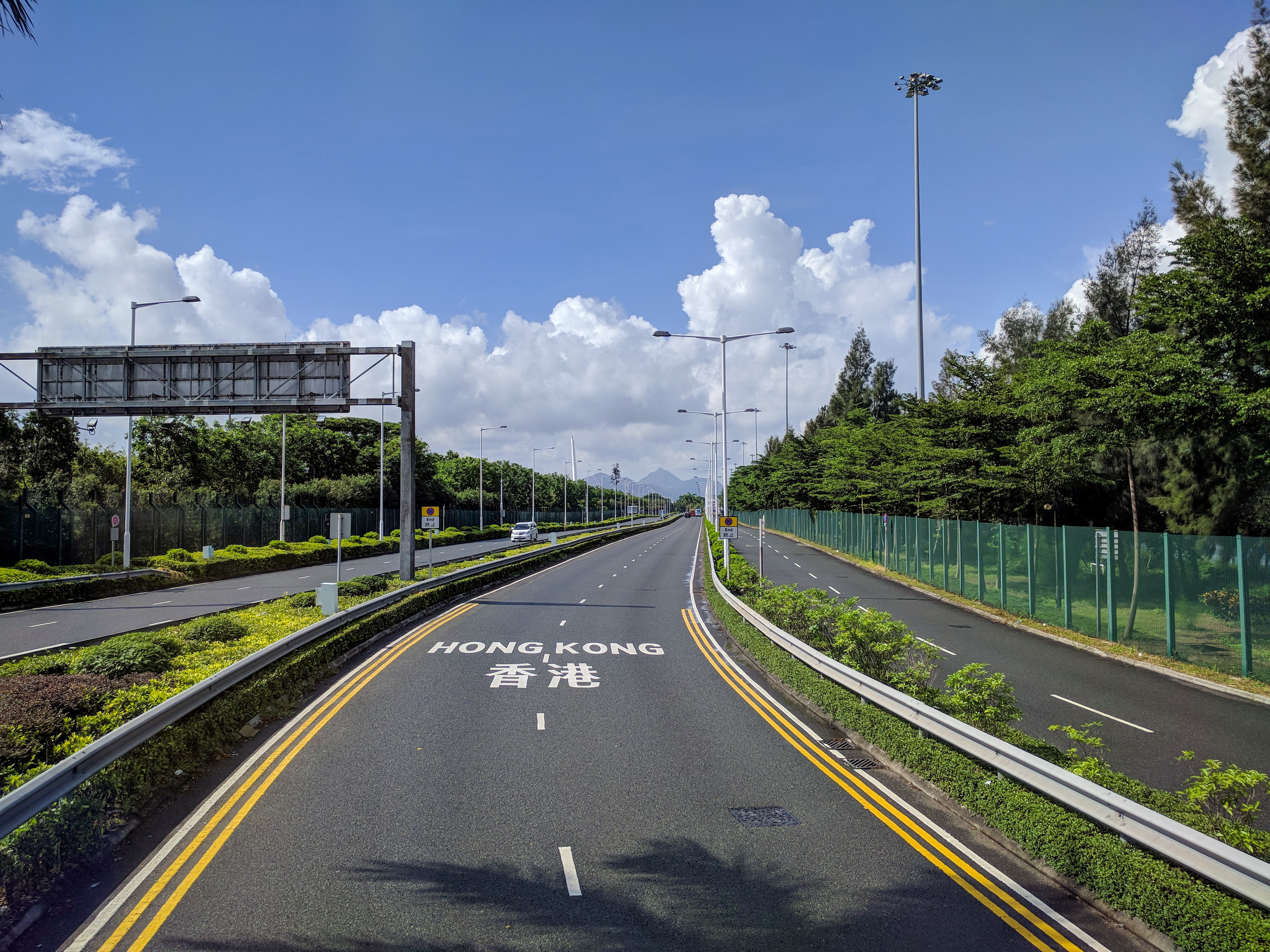

Route information
- Part of AH1
- Maintained by Highways Department
- Length: 10.9 km (6.8 mi)
- Existed: 1 July 2007–present

Major junctions
- South end: Route 9 at Lam Tei
- North end: Guangdong S3 / Dongbin Road in Shekou, Shenzhen

Location
- Country: China
- Special administrative region: Hong Kong
- Districts: Shekou, Tuen Mun

Highway system
- Transport in Hong Kong; Routes; Roads and Streets
← Route 9	→ Route 11

Route 10 (Chinese: 十號幹線) is a trunk route in the Hong Kong Strategic Route and Exit Number System. It is a 10.9 km (6.8 mi) dual carriageway with three lanes in each direction, consisting of the Kong Sham Western Highway (formerly Deep Bay Link) and the Shenzhen Bay Bridge of the Hong Kong–Shenzhen Western Corridor, connecting the Yuen Long Highway (Route 9) in Lam Tei to Shenzhen via the Shenzhen Bay Port border checkpoint. The entire highway forms part of Asian Highway 1, although the Asian Highway Network is not signed in Hong Kong. The trunk route is the only one in Hong Kong that terminates at a border crossing, and also the only trunk route that is partly built outside of Hong Kong.

At one stage, the Hong Kong Government had proposed to build the Yuen Long-Lantau and the Lantau-Hong Kong Island sections of Route 10. This plan was superseded by the Tuen Mun-Chek Lap Kok Link and the planned Route 11. As of mid-2010, various alignments for the Tuen Mun Western Bypass were being considered with ongoing consultation with the Yuen Long and Tuen Mun District Councils, Heung Yee Kuk and relevant rural committees.

== Exit list ==
District	Location	km	mi	Exit	Destinations	Notes
Yuen Long	Lam Tei	0.0– 1.0	0.0– 0.62	3	Route 9	AH1 continues on Route 9 eastbound to Lok Ma Chau Control Point
Yuen Long		4.2– 5.1	2.6– 3.2	1	Ha Tsuen Road	
Deep Bay		5.3– 11.0	3.3– 6.8	Hong Kong–Shenzhen Western Corridor		
Shenzhen	Shekou	11.0	6.8	—	Shenzhen Bay Port	Connects with Guangdong S3 Dongbin Tunnel (Guangshen Riverbank Expressway)
1.000 mi = 1.609 km; 1.000 km = 0.621 mi: Concurrency terminus
