= San Hing Tsuen =

San Hing Tsuen (新慶村) is the name of two villages in Hong Kong:

- San Hing Tsuen (Tuen Mun District) in Lam Tei, Tuen Mun District
- San Hing Tsuen (Yuen Long District) in Lau Fau Shan, Yuen Long District
