= Hong Kong–Shenzhen Western Corridor =

Cross-border highway between Hong Kong and Shenzhen, China

Hong Kong–Shenzhen Western Corridor
- Part of Route 10
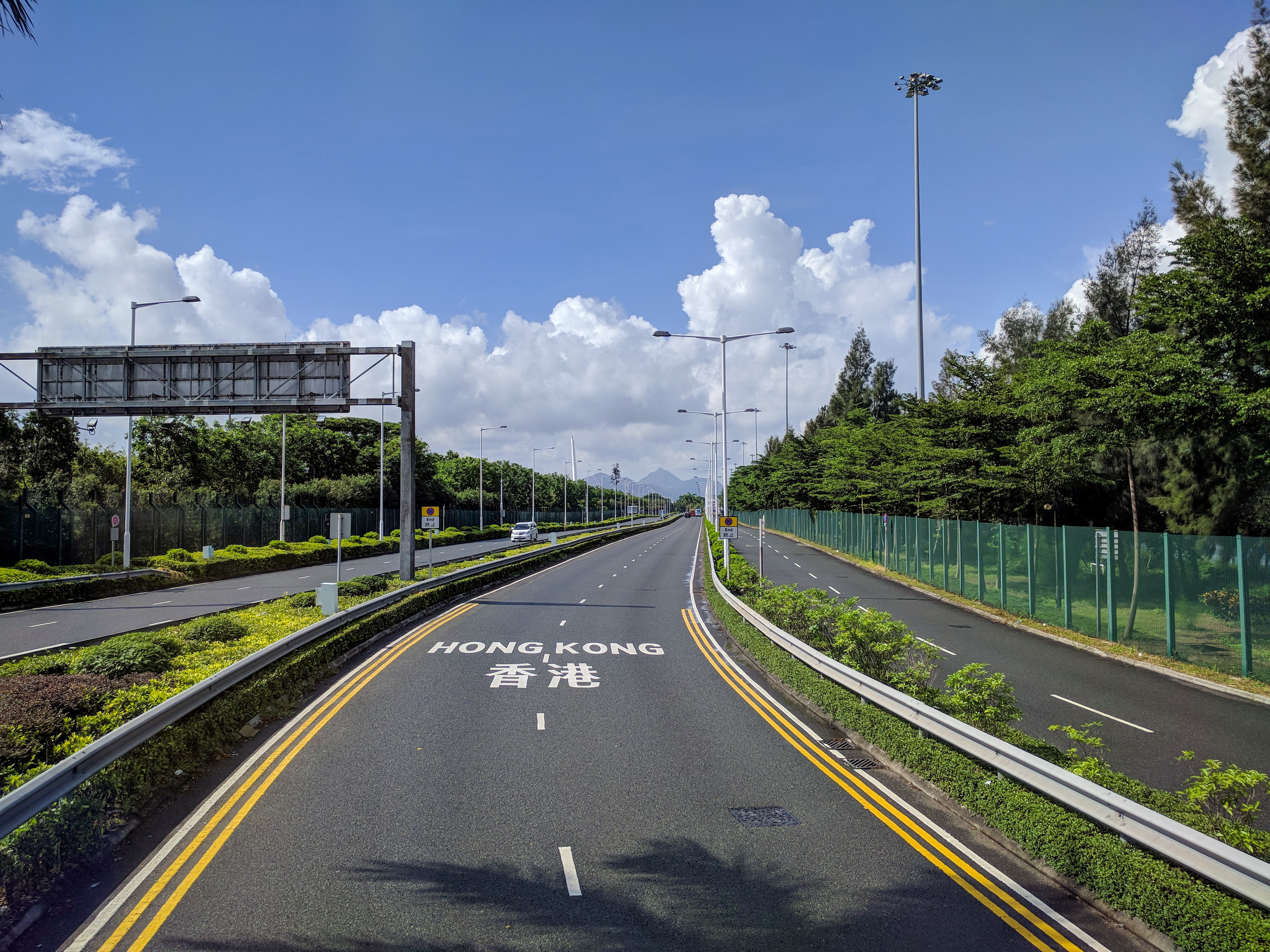

Route information
- Maintained by Highways Department
- Existed: 1 July 2007–present

Major junctions
- South end: Kong Sham Western Highway (near Ngau Hom Shek, Yuen Long District, Hong Kong)
- 1 junction in total; Shenzhen Bay Port
- North end: Dongjiaotou, Shenzhen

Location
- Country: China
- Special administrative region: Hong Kong
- Major cities: Hong Kong, Shenzhen

Highway system
- Transport in Hong Kong; Routes; Roads and Streets

Shenzhen Bay Bridge
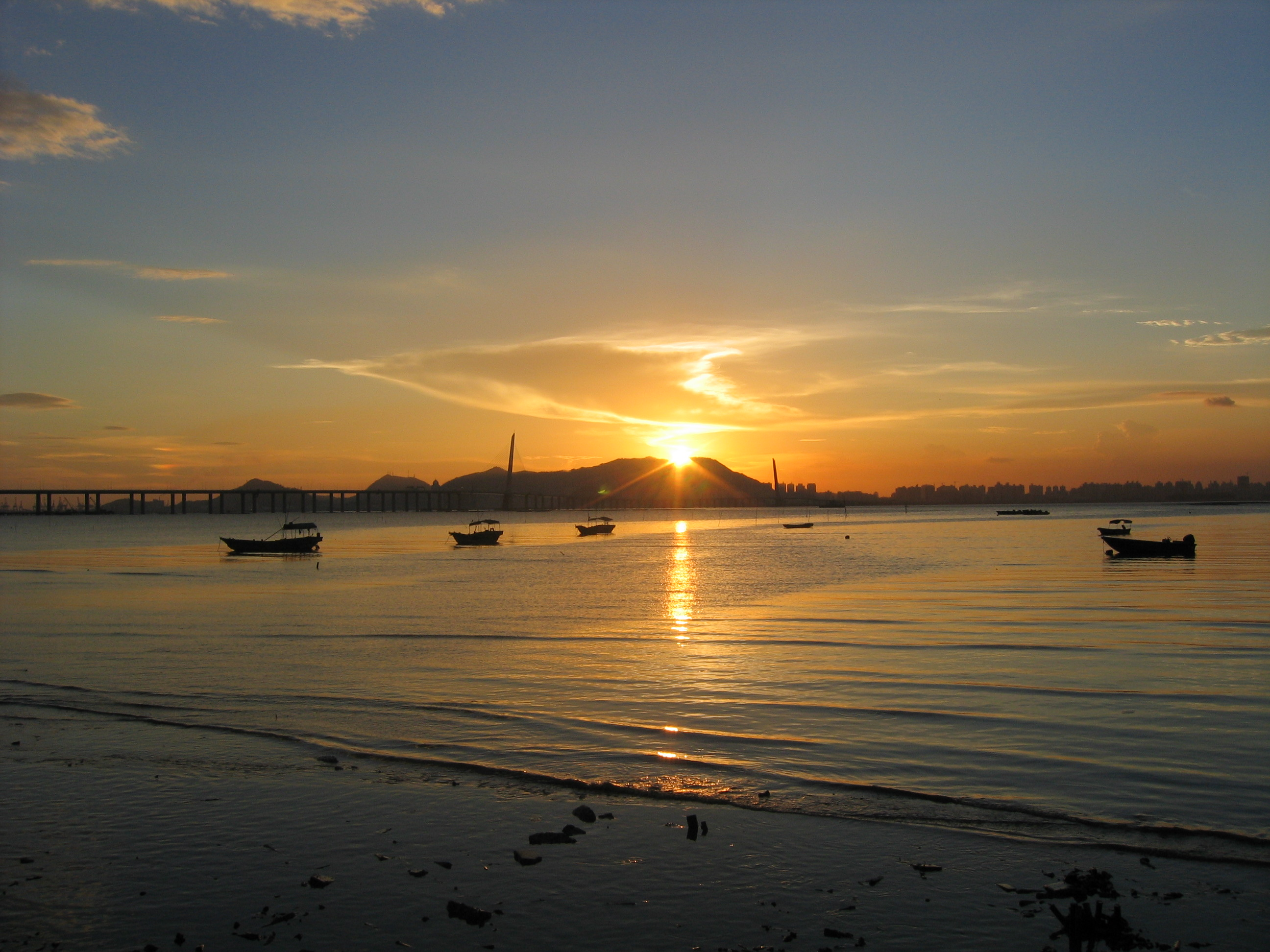
- Bridge at sunset
- Coordinates: 22°28′17″N 113°57′38″E
- Carries: 6 lanes highway
- Crosses: Deep Bay (also known as Shenzhen Bay & Hau Hoi Wan)
- Locale: Ngau Hom Shek, Hong Kong; Dongjiaotou, Shenzhen
- Official name: Shenzhen Bay Bridge
- Other name: Hong Kong–Shenzhen Western Corridor

Characteristics
- Design: Cable-stayed bridge
- Total length: 5,500 m (18,045 ft)
- Width: 6 lanes with shoulder
- Longest span: 210 m (689 ft)

History
- Opened: 1 July 2007; 19 years ago

Location
- Interactive map of Shenzhen Bay Bridge

Hong Kong–Shenzhen Western Corridor
- Traditional Chinese: 深港西部通道
- Simplified Chinese: 深港西部通道
Transcriptions
Standard Mandarin
- Hanyu Pinyin: Shēngǎng Xībù Tōngdào
Yue: Cantonese
- Yale Romanization: sam1 gong2 sai1 bou6 tung1 dou6
- Jyutping: sam1 gong2 sai1 bou6 tung1 dou6

Shenzhen Bay Bridge
- Traditional Chinese: 深圳灣公路大橋
- Simplified Chinese: 深圳湾公路大桥
Transcriptions
Standard Mandarin
- Hanyu Pinyin: Shēnzhènwān gōnglù dàqiáo
Yue: Cantonese
- Yale Romanization: sām jan wāan gūng louh daaih kìuh
- Jyutping: sam1 zan3 waan1 gung1 lou6 daai6 kiu4

The Hong Kong–Shenzhen Western Corridor, also known for the main component Shenzhen Bay Bridge, is a cross-border highway between Shenzhen, Guangdong Province and Hong Kong. The highway bridge is a 5.5-kilometre (3.4 mi) dual three-lane controlled-access highway. It connects Ngau Hom Shek (traditional Chinese: 鰲磡石; simplified Chinese: 鳌磡石), Hong Kong, to Dongjiaotou, which is administratively located in Nanshan District of Shenzhen. The corridor also had other components, a border checkpoint Shenzhen Bay Port, built on reclaimed land, as well as roads that connect the corridor to the existing road network of Shenzhen.

The highway bridge is part of Route 10 of the Hong Kong trunk road numbering system, the only other existing part being the Kong Sham Western Highway, formerly known as Deep Bay Link. The Shenzhen section of the Corridor was also included as the extension of the S3 Guangshen Riverbank Expressway since c. 2010.

== History and operation ==
Hong Kong–Shenzhen Western Corridor is a cross border transport infrastructure which connects Hong Kong and Shenzhen. It was opened on 1 July 2007, the 10th anniversary of the establishment of the Hong Kong as a special administrative region of China. According to the People's Daily as well as the China News Service, the corridor consists of three parts: a highway bridge which spans from Hong Kong and across the boundary of Hong Kong and Shenzhen, Shenzhen Bay Port as a border checkpoint, which is entirely inside the administrative boundary of Shenzhen, and roads that connect the corridor to the road network, the S3 Guangshen Riverbank Expressway (Note: At that time (2007, 2011) the construction of the Shezhen section of S3 Guangshen Riverbank Expressway was not yet completed.) However, departments and agencies of Hong Kong Government defined the bridge and port as separate items, and called the bridge as Hong Kong–Shenzhen Western Corridor or Shenzhen Bay Bridge. Shenzhen Bay Bridge was the gazetted name of the bridge.

The construction project was included in the Shenzhen municipal government's 10th Five Year Plan, which was announced in 2001. According to Shenzhen, the infrastructure was said to be planned since 1996. The cross border highway was also included in a feasibility study of the Hong Kong Government. The study was completed in 2001, and proposed to build the Hong Kong–Shenzhen Western Corridor and Deep Bay Link, as the fourth land boundary crossing. The other three land boundary crossings were Lok Ma Chau, Man Kam To and Sha Tau Kok respectively. In December 2002, the State Council (the Central Government) approved the plan of the route, which was submitted by Shenzhen. On 8 March 2002, the Finance Committee (FC) of the Hong Kong Legislative Council approved the funding of the design and site investigation for the Hong Kong section of the Corridor; the funding of the construction works of the Hong Kong section, which was estimated for HK$3.2 billion in money-of-the-day (MOD) price, (Note: money-of-the-day price means the price at the date of the payment to the contractors, which the government adjusted the present-day price with expected inflation (or deflation), making the total was the sum of the nominal price at the date of approval by the Legislative Coumcil plus expected inflation or deflation. See also Real versus nominal value (economics)) was approved along with the funding of the Deep Day Link on 21 February 2003. The constriction cost of the latter was estimated for HK$4.6 billion in MOD price. The funding of the Hong Kong Port Area, which was estimated for HK$2.5 billion in MOD prices, was approved by the FC on 18 July 2003. The Shenzhen sections was mainly funded by the Shenzhen municipal government, despite the central government also endorsed RMB 0.2 billion.

Construction of the project including the land reclamation, began on 28 August 2003 in Shenzhen, while the construction of the Shenzhen Bay Port building began in 2004. The main contractor of the construction of the Hong Kong section of the highway bridge, was a joint venture of Gammon, Skanska and China Railway Major Bridge Engineering Company (MBEC). Gammon Construction, at that time known as Gammon–Skanska Limited (Skanska was a co-owner of Gammon at that time), also won the contract to build the related infrastructure, the northern section of Kong Sham Western Highway, which known at that time as Deep Bay Link. The southern section would be built by another venture led by China State Construction. Hong Kong government also entrusted Shenzhen–Hong Kong Western Corridor Project Office to build the facilities of the Shenzhen Bay Port Hong Kong Port Area in 2004. Shenzhen Bay Port was entirely within the boundary of Shenzhen. In 2001, Hong Kong Government agreed in principle of co-locating the boundary crossing facilities, thus the birth of Shenzhen Bay Port Hong Kong Port Area.

Shenzhen–Hong Kong Western Corridor Project Office, a government agency, was responsible to build all the facilities within the Shenzhen boundary. Some of the construction was sub-contracted to other firms, such as Hsin Chong–Aster was responsible for the electrical and mechanical engineering of the Passenger Terminal Building (Hong Kong Side) of the Hong Kong Port Area. However, a scandal was exposed in 2015, which the facilities built by Shenzhen–Hong Kong Western Corridor Project Office (excluding Hong Kong Port Area) were over-budgeted from the original estimate RMB 2.4 billion, some items were purchased without open tender, as well as embezzle of public funds. Other controversies were exposed in 2005 on the approval of the project, which Shenzhen municipal government excluded the connection road of the corridor, as well as living quarter of the Shenzhen Port Area, from the submission to the State Council, despite departments of the government included them in the advertisements. As well as around the legitimacy of the approval in the sense of environmental protection law. According to the news report, the connection roads were not constructed by Shenzhen–Hong Kong Western Corridor Project Office, and the legal advisor of the municipal government denied any wrongdoing of the project in an interview.

The bridge was constructed separately between Hong Kong and Shenzhen governments. It use the maritime border of the two cities as the point of separation. Upon its opening, the Shenzhen section of the bridge, along with the Shenzhen Bay Port Hong Kong Port Area, were leased to Hong Kong and made under Hong Kong's jurisdiction for an initial period until 30 June 2047. Hong Kong also responsible to the maintenance and day-to-day operation of the Shenzhen section of the bridge. As such, Hong Kong laws, including traffic laws, instead of the laws of mainland China, apply on the whole bridge and within the Hong Kong Port Area.

The 3.2-kilometre (2.0 mi), Hong Kong section was completed in 2005. The corridor was scheduled for completion in 2006 but owing to the delay in the construction of the Shenzhen section and legal issues about applying the law of Hong Kong in co-location of immigration and customs facilities of Hong Kong and mainland China in Dongjiaotou, it was officially opened on 1 July 2007 by then-President and Communist Party general secretary Hu Jintao of China and the then-Chief Executive of Hong Kong Donald Tsang.

The biggest section of the link is the 4,770 m (15,650 ft) bridge spanning the Deep Bay. The cable-stayed bridge allows for the southern and northern navigation channels of the Sham Chun River. It can handle 58,600 vehicles and 60,000 cross-boundary tourists per day. The border crossing facilities in Dongjiaotou are separately managed by the Customs and Excise Department and Immigration Department of Hong Kong, and the China Customs.

== Mainland and Hong Kong Immigration co-location ==
The Hong Kong Government has to pay rent to Shenzhen government for the use of the port area, amounting to RMB 6 million per year. The rental agreement lasts until 30 June 2047.

== Transport ==
Four Hong Kong public bus routes run on this corridor. They are operated by the New Lantao Bus Company and Citybus.

- B2 to and from Yuen Long
- B2P to and from Tin Shui Wai
- B3 and B3A to and from various locations in Tuen Mun
- B3X to and from Tuen Mun (express service)

A green public light bus route, 618, also operates from Tin Shui Wai new town.

Hong Kong taxis, minibuses and cross-border buses are allowed access to the corridor; private vehicles must have the correct permit to use the corridor.

== See also ==
- Hong Kong–Zhuhai–Macau Bridge, another bridge that connects Hong Kong to mainland China, as well as Macau for the first time
- West Kowloon station, another co-location of immigrations and customs of Hong Kong and mainland China governments

== Footnotes ==
Preceded by Western Terminus	Hong Kong Route 10 Hong Kong–Shenzhen Western Corridor	Succeeded by Kong Sham Western Highway
