= Kong Sham Western Highway =

Road in Hong Kong

Kong Sham Western Highway
- Part of Route 10
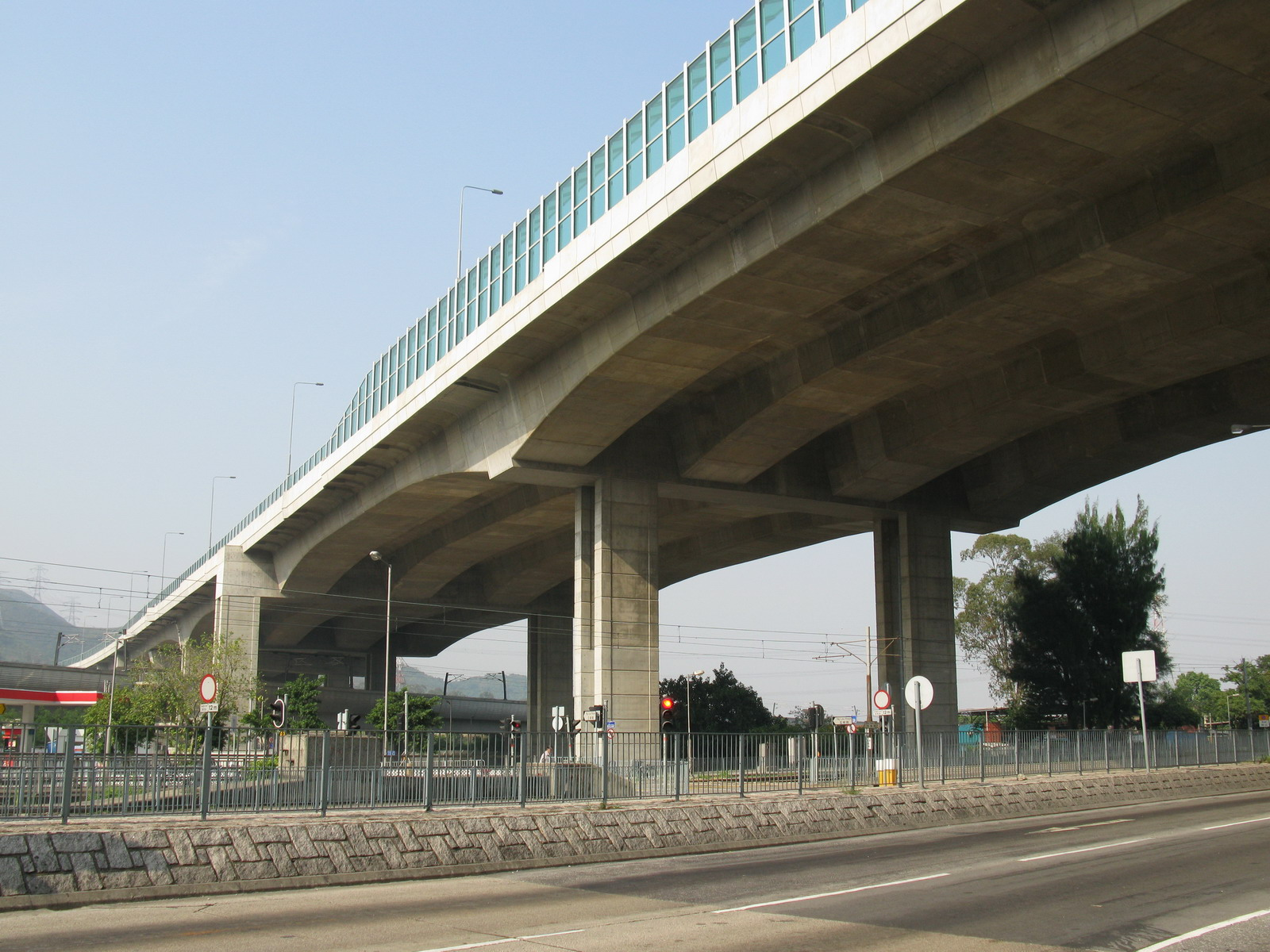
- A flyover of Kong Sham Western Highway crossing Castle Peak Road in Lam Tei in November 2007.

Route information
- Maintained by Highways Department
- Length: 5.4 km (3.4 mi)
- Existed: 1 July 2007–present

Major junctions
- North end: Ngau Hom Shek, Yuen Long District
- 2 in total; Route 9 at Lam Tei
- South end: Lam Tei, Tuen Mun District

Location
- Country: China
- Special administrative region: Hong Kong

Highway system
- Transport in Hong Kong; Routes; Roads and Streets

Chinese name
- Traditional Chinese: 港深西部公路
- Jyutping: gong2 sam1 sai1 bou6 gung1 lou6
- Cantonese Yale: góng sām sāi bouh gūng louh
- Hanyu Pinyin: Gǎng shēn xībù gōnglù
Transcriptions
Standard Mandarin
- Hanyu Pinyin: Gǎng shēn xībù gōnglù
Yue: Cantonese
- Yale Romanization: góng sām sāi bouh gūng louh
- Jyutping: gong2 sam1 sai1 bou6 gung1 lou6

Deep Bay Link
- Traditional Chinese: 后海灣幹線
- Simplified Chinese: 后海湾干线
- Jyutping: hau6 hoi2 waan1 gon3 sin3
- Hanyu Pinyin: Hòu Hǎiwān Gànxiàn
Transcriptions
Standard Mandarin
- Hanyu Pinyin: Hòu Hǎiwān Gànxiàn
Yue: Cantonese
- Jyutping: hau6 hoi2 waan1 gon3 sin3

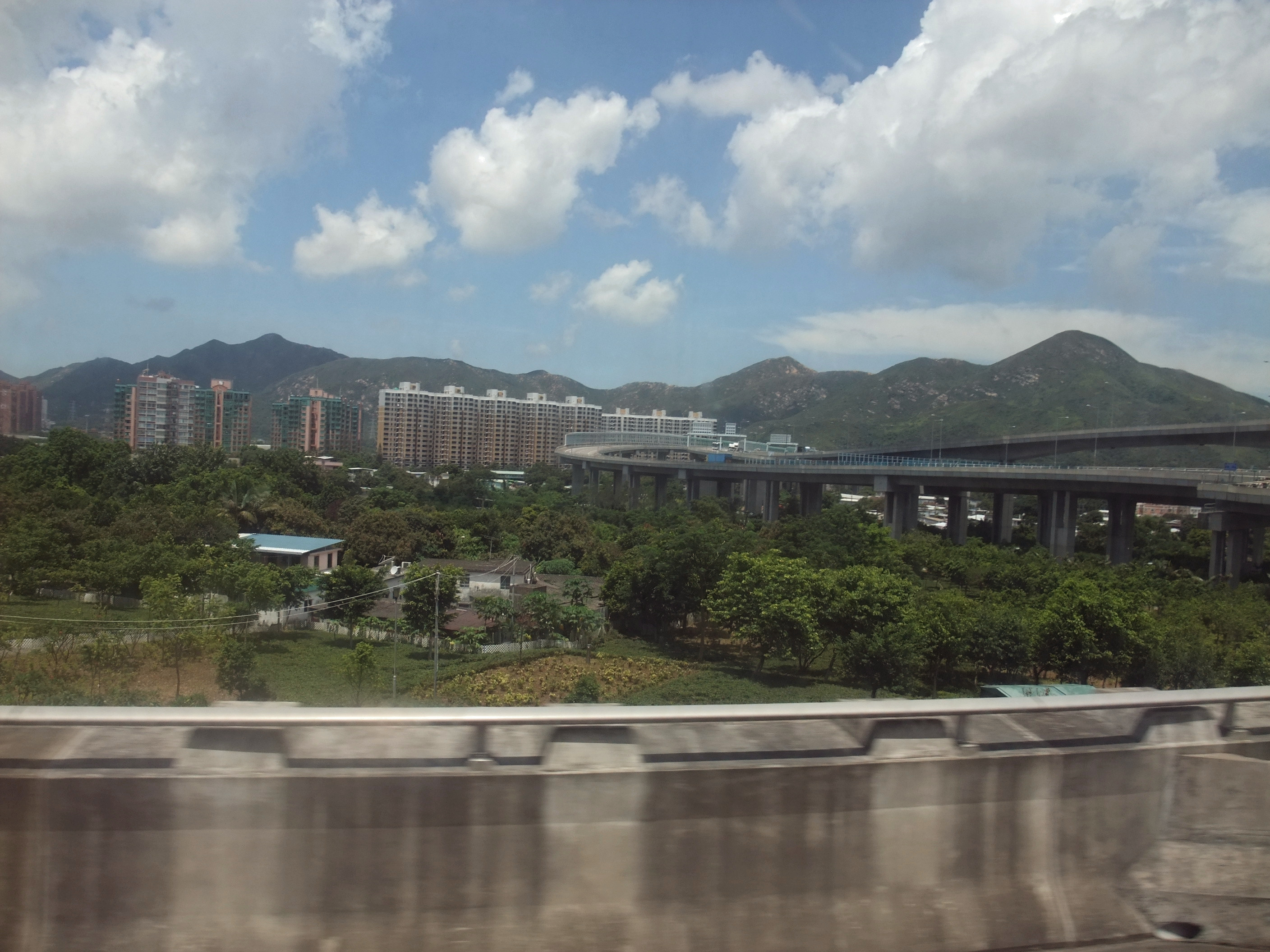
View from Yuen Long Highway towards the Kong Sham Western Highway and Lau Fau Shan in August 2011.

Kong Sham Western Highway, formerly known as the Deep Bay Link is a highway in Hong Kong. It is 5.4 kilometres (3.4 mi) long and has three lanes in each direction. Its northern end is at Ngau Hom Shek, near Deep Bay, and its southern end is at Lam Tei, in Tuen Mun District. Together with the Hong Kong–Shenzhen Western Corridor, it forms the Route 10 of the Hong Kong Strategic Route and Exit Number System and provides road access from Hong Kong to the mainland. The link itself consists of 108,000 m^{2} of deck space over 3,014 segments.

== History ==
The road was built as initiative from the Crosslinks Further Study, which highlighted the need for another vehicular cross-border link between Hong Kong and Shenzhen. At the date of the study (2001), there were three existing vehicular border crossings, located at Lok Ma Chau, Man Kam To and Sha Tau Kok. At that time, these links were nearing saturation and were expected to reach their maximum handling capacity by 2006. As a result, the government of Hong Kong proposed the Shenzhen Western Corridor and Deep Bay Link as an additional vehicular border crossing to provide additional cross-border road infrastructure.

The Environmental Protection Department of the Government of Hong Kong carried out an environmental impact assessment, and found that the environmental impact of the Deep Bay Link and associated carriageways will not be significantly adverse. The assessment however noted that Deep Bay Link might cause localized environmental impact, further detailed in the Feasibility Study for Additional Cross-border Links. The Deep Bay Link was therefore given the necessary environmental permit from the department.

The link's approved project cost is HK$4,600 million. The construction began in June 2003, and was commissioned in July 2007. The construction of the carriageway was split into two parts; northern and southern sections. Gammon Construction (at that time incorporated as "Gammon Skanska Limited", partially named after Skanska, a co-owner of the company) was the principal contractor for the northern section, and built around 4 km (2.5 mi) of the carriageway. China State Construction joint venture was in charge of the southern section.

== Interchanges ==
Kong Sham Western Highway
| Northbound exits | Exit number | Southbound exits |
continues on as Hong Kong–Shenzhen Western Corridor
| End Kong Sham Western Highway | | Start Kong Sham Western Highway |
| Ha Tsuen; Ha Tsuen Road; All non-permit holders | 1 | Ha Tsuen; Ha Tsuen Road |
| no exit | 3 | Tuen Mun, Kowloon; Yuen Long Highway |
| Start Kong Sham Western Highway | | End Kong Sham Western Highway; End of Route 10 intersects with Yuen Long Highway |

== Landmarks ==
The carriageway originates in the Lam Tei area, and passes through Ha Tsuen. Ling Lo Tsz, a Chinese temple, is accessible from a branch road off the carriageway.

It also passes through the Hung Shui Kiu/Ha Tsuen New Development Area.

== See also ==
- List of expressways in Hong Kong

| Preceded by Hong Kong–Shenzhen; Western Corridor | Hong Kong Route 10 Kong Sham Western Highway | Succeeded by Eastern Terminus |
