= Ngau Hom =

Coordinates: 22.464855°N 113.988756°E

Ngau Hom (Chinese: 鰲磡) is a village in Lau Fau Shan, Yuen Long District, New Territories, Hong Kong.

== Administration ==
Ngau Hom is a recognized village under the New Territories Small House Policy.
