= Lau Fau Shan =

Area in the New Territories, Hong Kong

Coordinates: 22.467803°N 113.982725°E

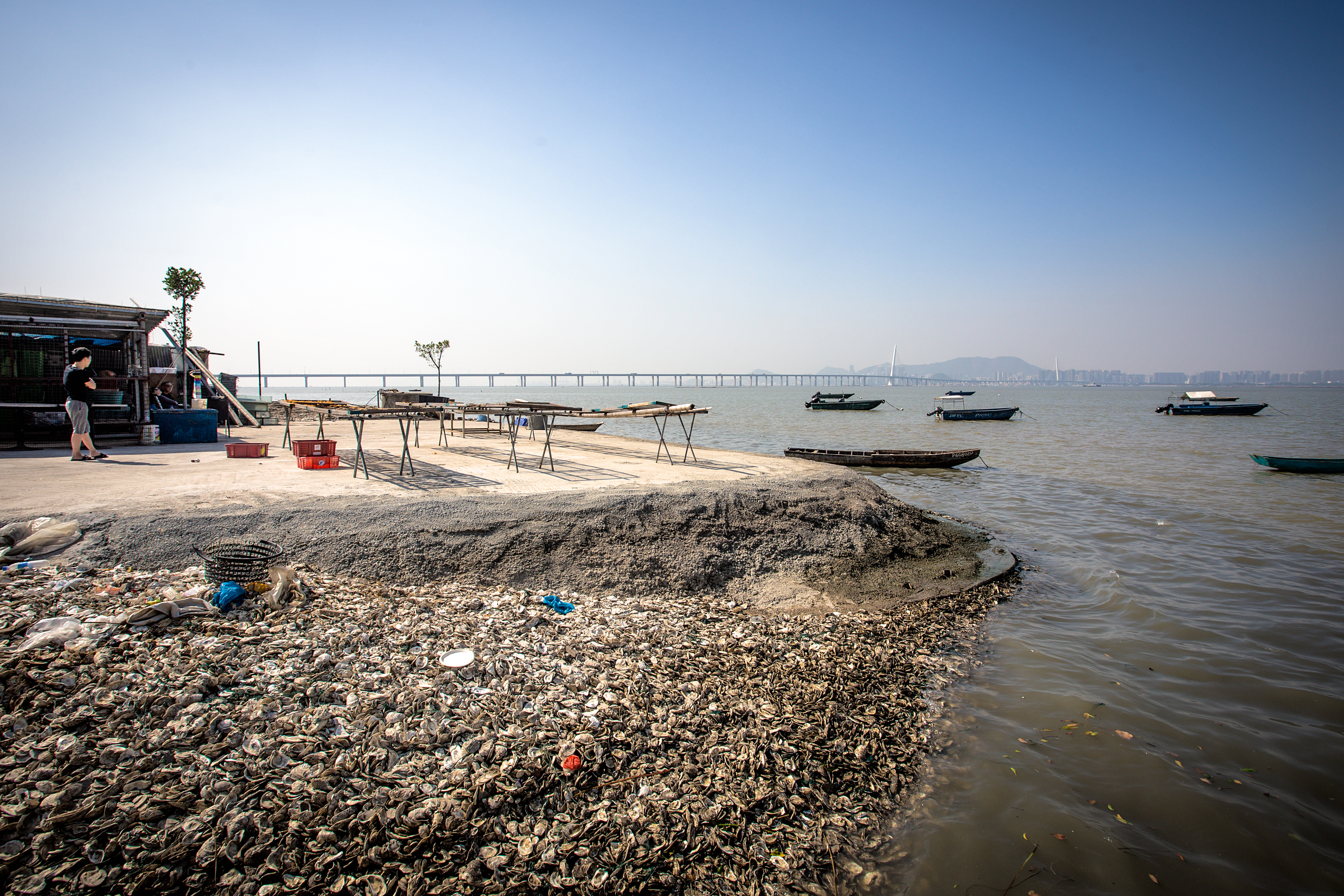
Drying seafood in Lau Fau Shan, facing Deep Bay. The Shenzhen Bay Bridge is visible in the background.

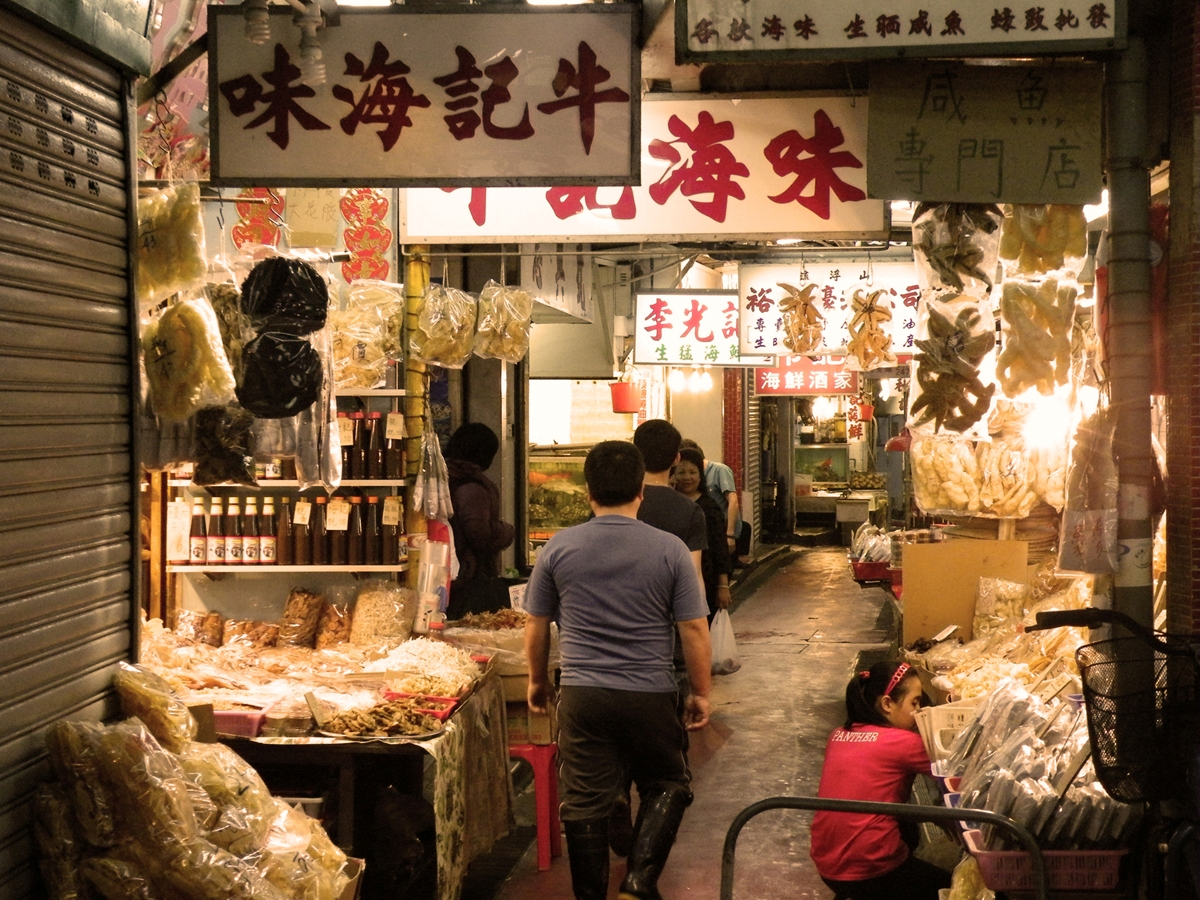
Shops in Lau Fau Shan.

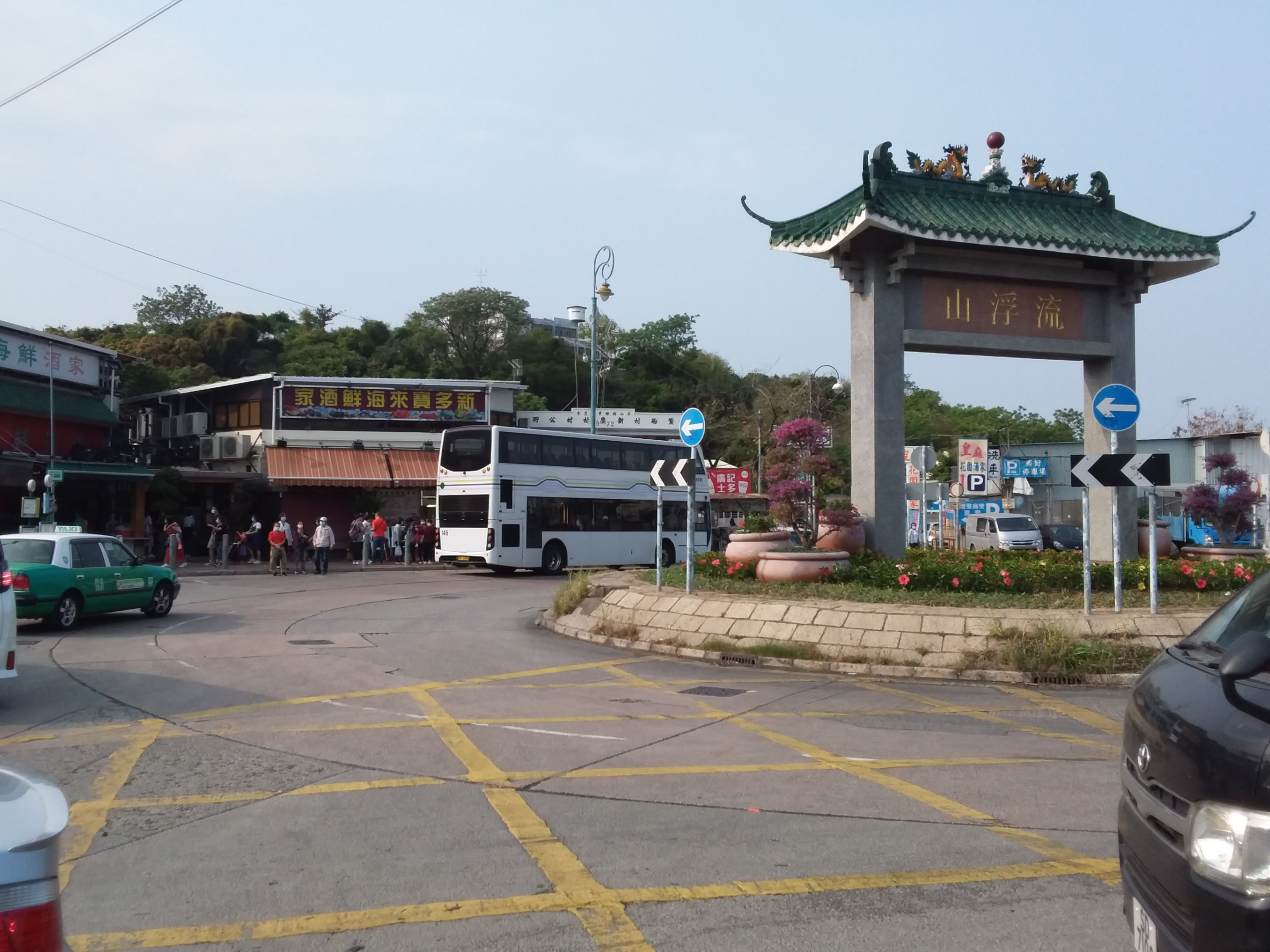
Lau Fau Shan Roundabout.

Lau Fau Shan (Chinese: 流浮山; lit. 'Floating mountain') is an area of Yuen Long District, in the New Territories of Hong Kong. It is at the shore of Deep Bay, near Tin Shui Wai and facing Shekou in Shenzhen, China.

== Economy ==
Lau Fau Shan is traditionally famous for fresh oysters. About 100 tons were harvested every year, some for consumption in Hong Kong restaurants and some for export to neighboring countries. However, little remains of this today since most of the inhabitants of Lau Fau Shan have given up oyster culture.

== Features ==
Here stands a 1500-year-old temple founded by the legendary monk Pui To, who is said to have landed on this coast in a wooden tub.

== Education ==
Lau Fau Shan is in Primary One Admission (POA) School Net 72. Within the school net are multiple aided schools (operated independently but funded with government money) and one government school: Tin Shui Wai Government Primary School (天水圍官立小學).

== Climate ==
Climate data for Lau Fau Shan (1991–2020)
Month	Jan	Feb	Mar	Apr	May	Jun	Jul	Aug	Sep	Oct	Nov	Dec	Year
Record high °C (°F)	29.0 (84.2)	29.3 (84.7)	31.4 (88.5)	33.2 (91.8)	36.5 (97.7)	38.9 (102.0)	38.4 (101.1)	37.8 (100.0)	35.9 (96.6)	34.4 (93.9)	32.9 (91.2)	29.6 (85.3)	38.9 (102.0)
Mean daily maximum °C (°F)	19.2 (66.6)	20.3 (68.5)	23.1 (73.6)	26.6 (79.9)	29.7 (85.5)	31.2 (88.2)	31.7 (89.1)	31.5 (88.7)	31.0 (87.8)	28.8 (83.8)	25.3 (77.5)	20.8 (69.4)	26.6 (79.9)
Daily mean °C (°F)	15.4 (59.7)	16.6 (61.9)	19.2 (66.6)	22.9 (73.2)	26.1 (79.0)	27.9 (82.2)	28.4 (83.1)	28.2 (82.8)	27.4 (81.3)	25.0 (77.0)	21.3 (70.3)	16.9 (62.4)	22.9 (73.3)
Mean daily minimum °C (°F)	12.4 (54.3)	13.8 (56.8)	16.5 (61.7)	20.2 (68.4)	23.5 (74.3)	25.5 (77.9)	25.9 (78.6)	25.7 (78.3)	24.8 (76.6)	22.2 (72.0)	18.3 (64.9)	13.8 (56.8)	20.2 (68.4)
Record low °C (°F)	1.7 (35.1)	3.5 (38.3)	3.2 (37.8)	8.8 (47.8)	15.9 (60.6)	19.5 (67.1)	21.1 (70.0)	22.2 (72.0)	17.5 (63.5)	13.9 (57.0)	5.4 (41.7)	2.8 (37.0)	1.7 (35.1)
Average precipitation mm (inches)	32.3 (1.27)	34.6 (1.36)	59.1 (2.33)	124.7 (4.91)	206.8 (8.14)	312.8 (12.31)	227.7 (8.96)	274.5 (10.81)	185.3 (7.30)	52.1 (2.05)	35.4 (1.39)	30.6 (1.20)	1,575.9 (62.03)
Average relative humidity (%)	72.7	76.9	78.2	80.7	81.1	82.9	82.3	83.3	79.4	72.6	73.2	67.7	77.6
Source: Hong Kong Observatory

== See also ==
- Metapenaeus ensis
- Former Lau Fau Shan Police Station
- Ngau Hom
- San Hing Tsuen
