= Dongjiaotou =

Area of Shenzhen, China

Dongjiaotou (Chinese: 东角头; pinyin: Dōngjiǎotóu) is a largely residential and former industrial area between Shekou and Houhai, Nanshan, Shenzhen, China.

== See also ==
- Dongjiaotou station, the Shenzhen Metro station serving the area.
- Shenzhen Bay Control Point
