= San Hing Tsuen (Yuen Long District) =

Coordinates: 22.465121°N 113.986985°E

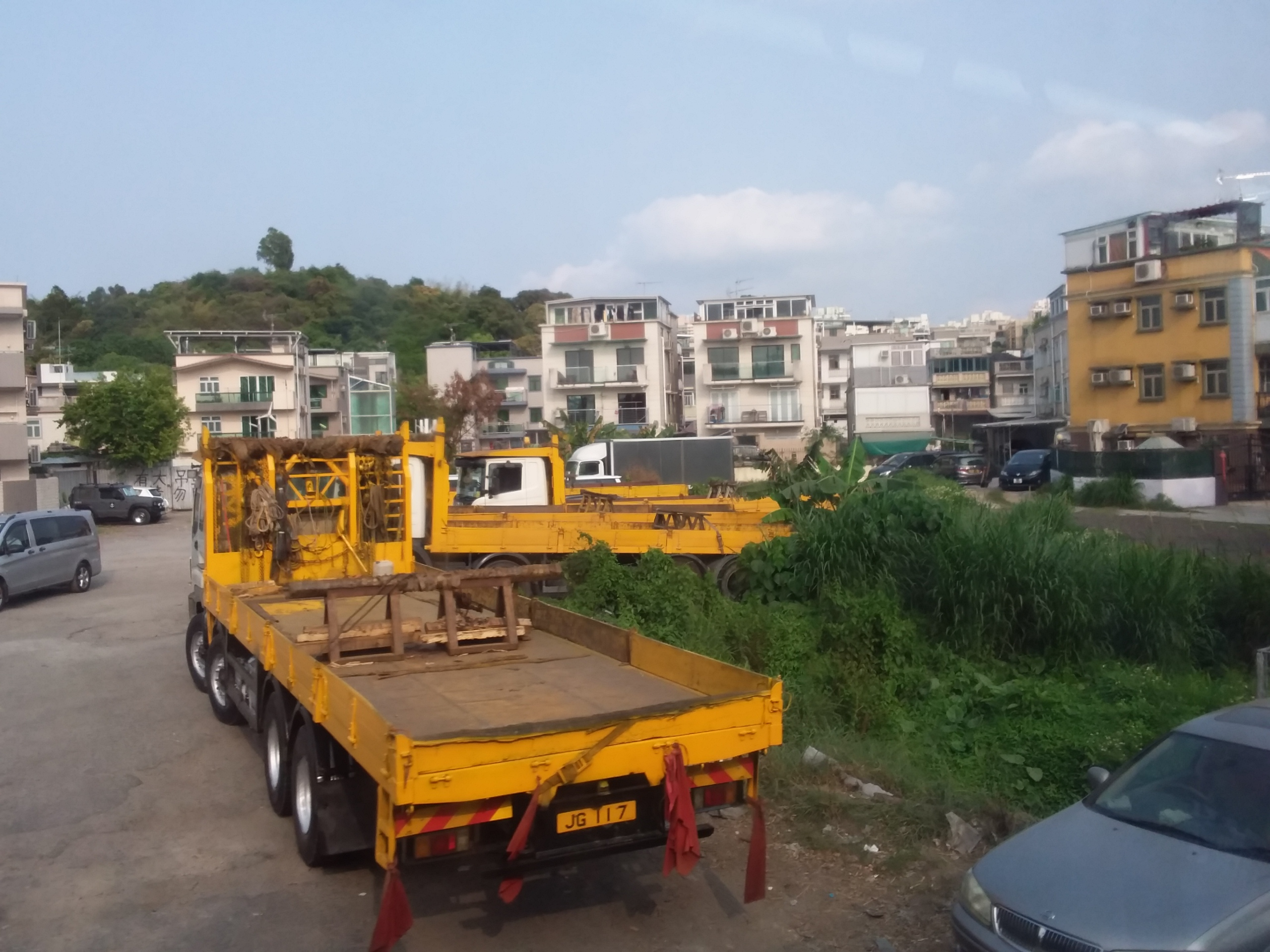
San Hing Tsuen viewed from Lau Fau Shan Road.

San Hing Tsuen (Chinese: 新慶村) is a village in Lau Fau Shan, Yuen Long District, New Territories, Hong Kong.

== Administration ==
San Hing Tsuen is a recognized village under the New Territories Small House Policy.
