= Shenzhen Bay Port =

Port of entry between Hong Kong and China

- 深圳湾口岸 深圳灣口岸
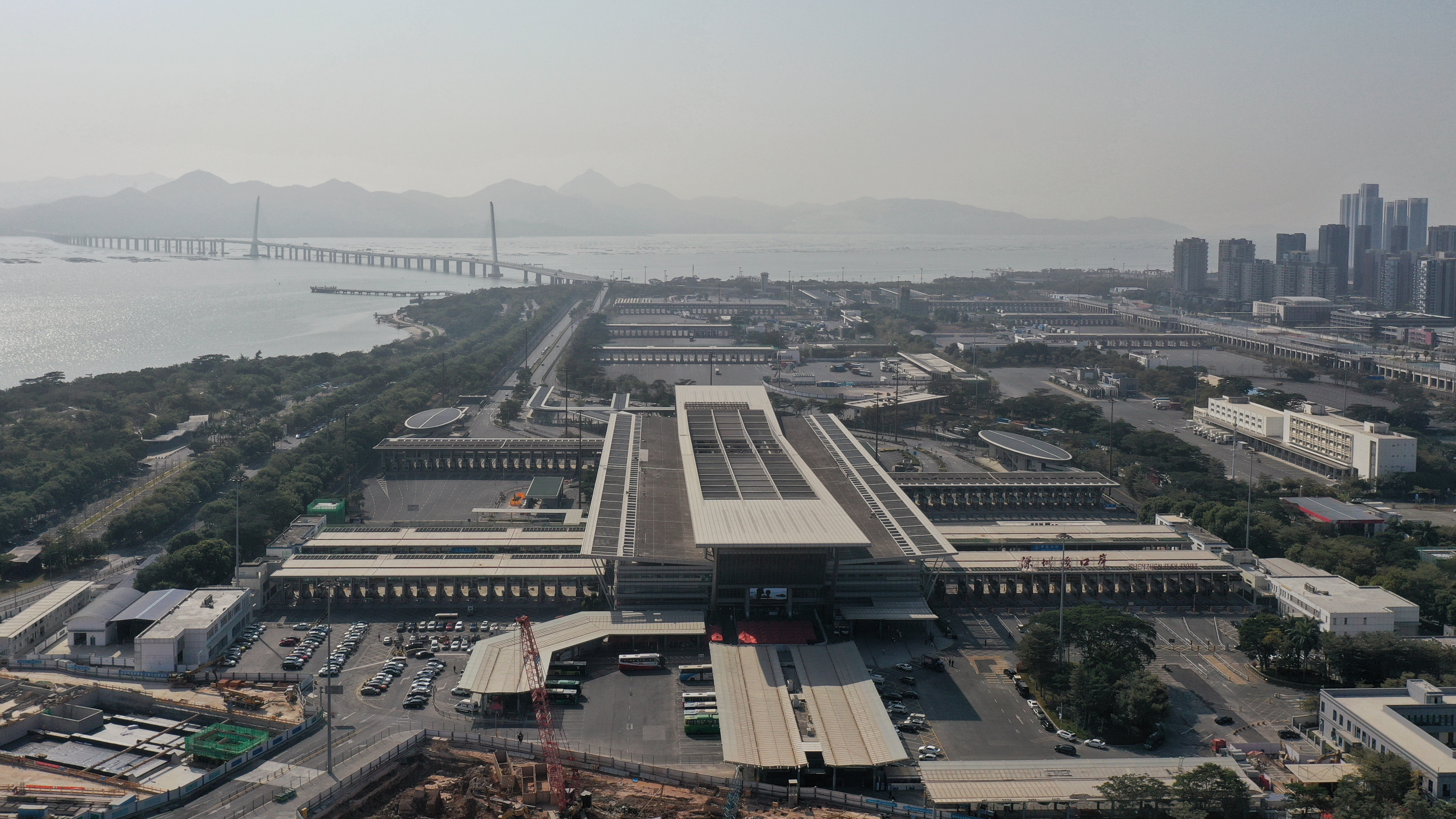
- Shenzhen Bay Port Passenger Terminal Building (aerial view), with view of the Hong Kong–Shenzhen Western Corridor
- Interactive map of the Shenzhen Bay Port area

General information
- Type: Border control
- Location: Shekou, Shenzhen, China
- Coordinates: 22.5039°N 113.9447°E
- Named for: Shenzhen Bay (known as Deep Bay in English and "Hau Hoi Wan" in Cantonese)
- Opened: 1 July 2007
- Operator: National Immigration Administration (mainland China); Immigration Department (Hong Kong), Customs and Excise Department (Hong Kong)

Website
- ka.sz.gov.cn (mainland China) td.gov.hk (Hong Kong)
- Coordinates: 22°30′14″N 113°56′41″E
- Carries: Vehicles, Containers, Cargo
- Crosses: Frontier Closed Area

Statistics
- Toll: No toll

Location
- Interactive map of Shenzhen Bay Port

Shenzhen Bay Port
- Traditional Chinese: 深圳灣口岸
- Simplified Chinese: 深圳湾口岸
Transcriptions
Standard Mandarin
- Hanyu Pinyin: Shēnzhèn Wān Kǒu'àn
Yue: Cantonese
- Jyutping: sam1 zan3 waan1 hau2 ngon6

Shenzhen Bay Port (Chinese: 深圳湾口岸) is a juxtaposed border crossing and a port of entry and exit between mainland China and the Hong Kong Special Administrative Region, located geographically in Dongjiaotou, Shekou, which lies on the southwestern corner of the city of Shenzhen in Guangdong Province.

The port of entry and exit consists of a cross-boundary passenger terminal building, where the counterparts of mainland China and the Hong Kong SAR are co-located. A "Shenzhen Bay Port Hong Kong Port Area", including part of the building and its adjacent area, and the entire length of the bridge on Chinese waters, is placed under Hong Kong jurisdiction under a lease until 30 June 2047, the eve of the 50th anniversary of the SAR. It is where Hong Kong's Shenzhen Bay Control Point is located.

The rest of the Port area is Shenzhen Bay Port Shenzhen Port Area.

The port of entry was commissioned on 1 July 2007.

== History ==
Shenzhen Bay Port is part of the Hong Kong–Shenzhen Western Corridor, which was proposed by the Shenzhen municipal government to the Chinese central government as well as the colonial British government of Hong Kong in the 1990s. Hong Kong became the first special administrative region of China (SAR) on 1 July 1997. In March 2001, a feasibility study by the Hong Kong government, suggested to build the Hong Kong–Shenzhen Western Corridor. A further inter-government meeting in July 2001 concluded that, the border checkpoint of the Corridor should be co-located in the same place, thus the birth of Shenzhen Bay Port, which was sub-divided into Hong Kong Port Area and Shenzhen Port Area. The name Shenzhen Bay Port (simplified Chinese: 深圳湾口岸; traditional Chinese: 深圳灣口岸) was agreed by another inter-government meeting in August 2004. (Note: In the English press release on the same day, the name was translated as Shenzhen Bay Control Point. Shenzhen Bay Control Point was later used as the translation of Chinese: 深圳灣管制站 only.) Hong Kong government also entrusted Shenzhen municipal government to build the facilities of the Shenzhen Bay Port Hong Kong Port Area in July 2004. Some of the facilities was also sub-contracted to Hong Kong firm, such as Hsin Chong–Aster JV was responsible for the electrical and mechanical engineering of the Passenger Terminal Building (Hong Kong Side) of the Hong Kong Port Area.

The Port was opened on 1 July 2007, the 10th anniversary of the SAR, when Hu Jintao, the then General Secretary of the Chinese Communist Party and Chinese President, attended the opening ceremony. Hu and 6 other people officiated the ribbon-cutting ceremony of the Port.

== Road network ==
=== Hong Kong–Shenzhen Western Corridor ===
The Port connects to Hong Kong via the Shenzhen Bay Bridge, the main component of the Hong Kong–Shenzhen Western Corridor.

==== Management ====
Hong Kong government also managed the Shenzhen section of the Shenzhen Bay Bridge, another component of the Corridor, despite geographically inside the boundary of Shenzhen. Shenzhen section of the bridge was in-between the Hong Kong section of the bridge, and the land area of the Port, which partly leased to Hong Kong as Hong Kong Port Area.

=== Connection on the Hong Kong side ===
Once landed on the land area of Hong Kong at Ngau Hom Shek, the cross-border traffic would use Kong Sham Western Highway and then the existing road networks to go to their destinations in Hong Kong.

=== Connection on the Shenzhen side ===
After crossing the mainland China port area, the road connects to Dongbin Road which is located at north of the mainland China port section.

== Hong Kong Port Area ==
Shenzhen Bay Control Point, inside Hong Kong Port Area, is the first boundary control point with the immigration facilities of the Hong Kong side co-located in the same passenger terminal building with the mainland side. This allows passengers and vehicles for departure and arrival customs clearance to take place within a short distance. The Hong Kong Government has to pay rent to the Shenzhen government for the use of the port area, amounting to RMB 6 million per year. The rental agreement lasts until 30 June 2047.

The Hong Kong Port Area is a Closed Area requiring a valid travel document for cross-boundary visitors and a Closed Area permit for non-cross-boundary travelers. Travelers should pay attention to the Port hours as roads leading to the port close 30 minutes before the stopping of operations. There are multiple forms of transportation to get to and from the port including cross-boundary coach services, cross-boundary hire car services, franchised bus services, green minibus service, and taxi services.

== Transport ==
=== Hong Kong Port Area ===
Transport is located at Shenzhen Bay Port Public Transport Interchange.

Bus

Route	Destination	Fare
B2	Shenzhen Bay Port ↔ Yuen Long station	HK$15.8
B2P	Shenzhen Bay Port ↔ Tin Tsz Estate	HK$11.3
B2X	Shenzhen Bay Port ↔ Tin Yiu Estate	HK$11.3
B3	Shenzhen Bay Port ↔ Tuen Mun Pier Head	HK$16.5
B3A	Shenzhen Bay Port ↔ Tuen Mun Shan King	HK$16.5
B3M	Shenzhen Bay Port ↔ Tuen Mun station	HK$16.5
B3X	Shenzhen Bay Port ↔ Tuen Mun Town Centre	HK$16.5

Minibus: Route 618 - Shenzhen Bay Port ↔ Tin Yan Estate (via Tin Shui Wai North) (Fare: $14.4)

Taxi (varies by distance and destination)

=== Shenzhen Port Area ===
Shenzhen Metro : Line 13 Shenzhen Bay Checkpoint Station Exit B and Exit C

Bus

Route	Destination			Fare
90	Window of the World Terminal	⇆	Shenzhen Bay Port Car Park A	RMB ¥2
M177	Shekou Square	⇆	Shenzhen Bay Port Car Park A	RMB ¥2
M506	Zhongshan Yuan Plaza	⇆	Shenzhen Bay Port Car Park A	RMB ¥2
M507	Dachanwan Bus Terminal	⇆	Shenzhen Bay Port Car Park A	RMB ¥2
N73	Shenzhen Bay Port Car Park A	↺	Shenzhen Bay Port Car Park A	RMB ¥2
N90	Window of the World Terminal	⇆	Shenzhen Bay Port Car Park A	RMB ¥2

Taxi (varies by distance and destination)

Online-reserved taxi (varies by distance and destination)

== See also ==
- Hong Kong West Kowloon railway station, another co-location of immigration and customs of Hong Kong and mainland China
- Juxtaposed controls - co-location of immigration and customs on trains and ferries
