= Hong Kong Strategic Route and Exit Number System =

Trunk road numbering system in Hong Kong

Strategic Route and Exit Number System
- Highway marker for Route 1

- A map of all routes in Hong Kong

System information
- Maintained by Transport Department
- Length: 231.3 km (143.7 mi)
- Formed: 2004; 22 years ago

Highway names
- Route: Route X

System links
- Transport in Hong Kong; Routes; Roads and Streets

The Hong Kong Strategic Route and Exit Number System (Chinese: 香港主要幹線及出口編號系統) is a system adopted by the Transport Department of the Hong Kong Government to organise the major roads in the territory into routes 1 to 10 for the convenience of drivers. When the system was implemented in 2004, the government promoted it with a major public campaign, including the slogan "Remember the Numbers; Make Driving Easier" (Chinese: 認路記號碼，唔使路路查).

The system comprises ten major series of roads in Hong Kong, numbered routes 1 to 10, which can be classified into three categories: the three north–south routes, the six east–west routes and the New Territories Circular Road. The route numbers are displayed as black on yellow "road-shields" on overhead road signs.

Parts of the road system are limited-access roads, and a significant portion of these roads are expressways. The system also utilises exit numbering with the exits of each route are numbered sequentially; some exit numbers are suffixed with a letter. Exit numbers are indicated by white-in-black rectangular boxes on overhead and roadside signs.

== Features ==
There are no traffic lights on the expressways. Traffic interchange with other roads is entirely via slip roads, maximising vehicular flow and land space usage. There are some stack interchanges.

The Strategic Route System has traffic lights on only a few roads, such as Waterloo Road (Route 1) and Kwun Tong Road (Route 7).

The road surface is asphalt. The lanes are separated by white dashed lines, while unbroken white lines are used to mark the edges of the median and shoulder. The shoulder is reserved for stops due to breakdowns and emergencies, and motorists are prohibited by law from travelling on it. Lanes are numbered from right to left, with lane 1 being the closest to the median. Crash barriers, cat's eyes and rumble strips are also used to ensure road safety. Signs mark the start and end of an expressway at its entry and exit points respectively. These expressways do not have rest areas.

The speed limits for most vehicles (see the paragraph below for exceptions) on the Hong Kong highways are 110 km/h for North Lantau Highway, 100 km/h for the New Territories roads and West Kowloon Highway, 80 km/h for most expressways and 70 km/h on older ones such as the Island Eastern Corridor, East Kowloon Corridor, West Kowloon Corridor and Tsuen Wan Road. A speeding offence less than 10 km/h over the speed limit is not usually enforced. Many drivers in Hong Kong thus drive at a speed that is 5–10 km/h above the speed limit. If drivers are travelling at a speed of 15 km/h more than the speed limit, speed limit enforcement cameras will be activated and drivers may receive a fine.

As stipulated by the Laws of Hong Kong Cap 374 s 40 (5) and (5A), medium goods vehicles, heavy goods vehicles and buses or any vehicle driven by a driver with a probationary driving licence shall travel no faster than the speed limit of the road or 70 km/h, whichever is slower; while minibuses shall travel no faster than the speed limit of the road or 80 km/h, whichever is slower. Many vehicles of these types actually ignore this and simply follow the speed limit of the road on the Hong Kong highways, thereby committing speeding offence. However, this law is not usually enforced – cameras are not tuned to be triggered differently by these types of vehicle.

== Route number system ==
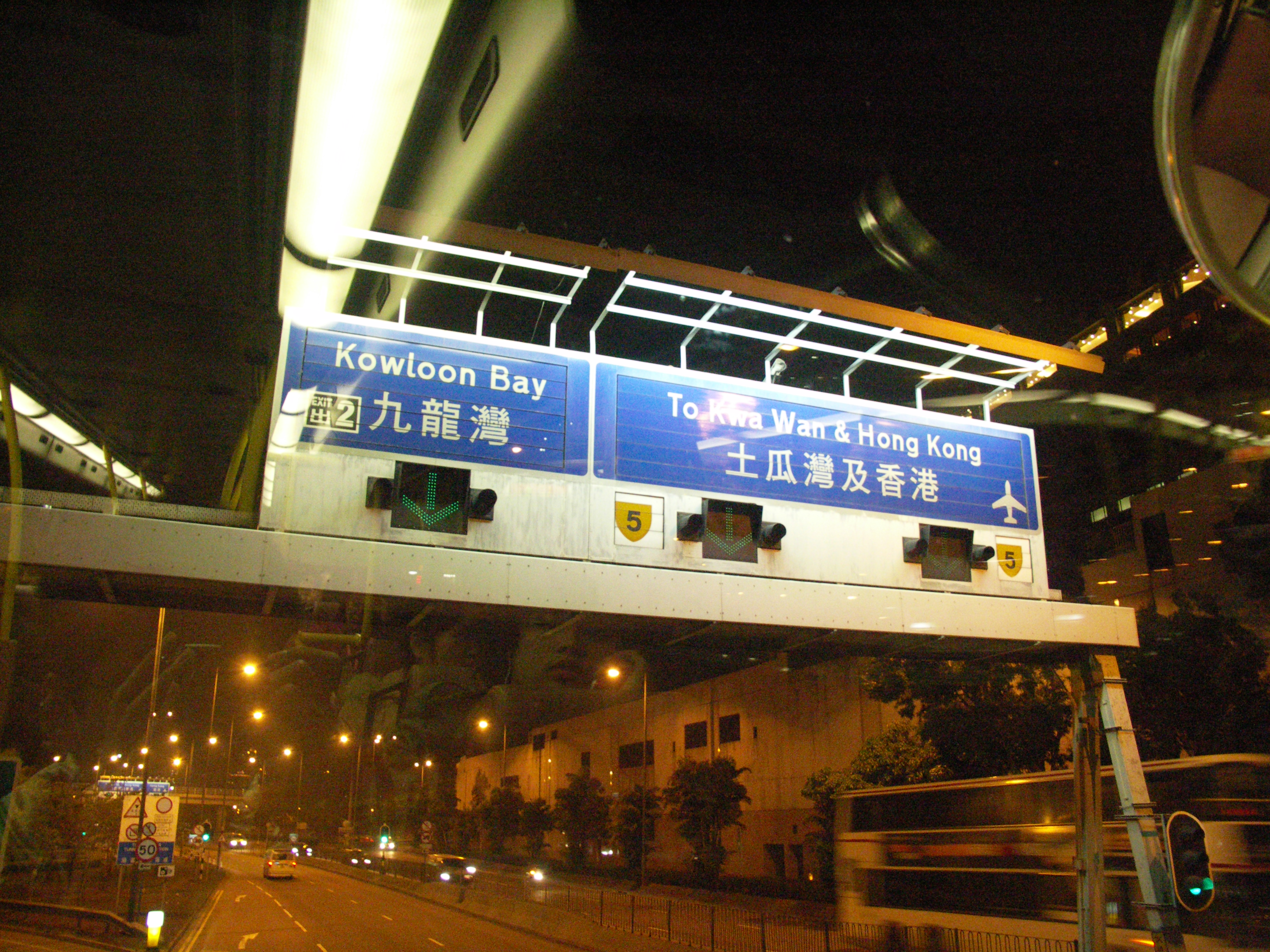
The "Exit 2" and "Route 5" signs at the entrance of Kai Tak Tunnel

The three north–south routes are Route 1, Route 2, and Route 3. They connect Hong Kong Island, metro Kowloon and the New Territories via a series of flyovers and tunnels. They pass through the three tunnels crossing Victoria Harbour, and their sequence of numbering follows the order of opening dates of the three tunnels:

- Route 1: Cross-Harbour Tunnel (opened 1972)
- Route 2: Eastern Harbour Crossing (opened 1989; formerly Route 6)
- Route 3: Western Harbour Crossing (opened 1997)

The five east–west routes — Route 4, Route 5, Route 6, Route 7, Route 8 and Route 10 — are numbered from south to north. Route 4 runs along the north shore of Hong Kong Island, connecting the eastern and western ends of the island, whereas Routes 5, 6 and 7 link southern New Territories with parts of Kowloon. Route 8 provides direct access to Chek Lap Kok Airport, and was extended to Sha Tin in 2008. Route 10 provides access to the border crossing at Shekou, Shenzhen.

- Route 4: formerly Routes 7 and 8 (opened 1990)
- Route 5: formerly Tsuen Wan – Ngau Tau Kok section of Route 2 (opened 1970-1980s)
- Route 6: comprises the Central Kowloon Bypass (Yau Ma Tei section completed. Kowloon Bay section under construction) and the Tseung Kwan O-Lam Tin Tunnel (partially completed as of 2025)
- Route 7: formerly Route 4 (opened 1970s)
- Route 8: formerly Route 9 (Tsing Yi – Airport section opened 1997; Tsing Yi – Cheung Sha Wan section opened December 2009; Cheung Sha Wan – Sha Tin section opened 2008)
- Route 10 (opened 2007)

The circular route, Route 9, circumscribes the New Territories, with the exit at the Shing Mun Tunnels in Sha Tin as the starting point of exit-numbering. It links up the network of expressways and trunk roads in the New Territories into a large ring.

- Route 9: formerly Route 5 + Fo Tan – Lok Ma Chau section of Route 1 + Tsuen Wan – Lok Ma Chau section of Route 2 (construction from 1974 to 2007)

=== Future Highways ===
- Route 11: A proposed highway going from Tsing Yi - Lantau Link and passing through two tunnels and a bridge until it reaches the junction with Route 9 and Route 10. It is scheduled to be completed in 2033.

== Exit number system ==
In parallel with route numbering, the junctions between routes and exits from routes are also labelled with exit numbers. On every route, exits are numbered from one end to the other with ascending consecutive integers with a mixture of alphabet-suffixed labels (1, 2, 2A, 2B, 3, 4... etc.), similar in function to UK motorway junction markers.

== History ==
=== First generation ===
The first generation of the route number system in Hong Kong was envisaged in the 1968 Hong Kong Long Term Road Study by Freeman, Fox, Wilbur Smith & Associates, in which trunk routes were given single-digit numbers, and distributors with double-digit ones. Also included in the road study was an unnumbered Western Harbour Crossing (WHC), which in the plan involved a bridge crossing the Victoria Harbour between Cherry Street in Mong Kok and Kennedy Town, by way of Stonecutters Island and Green Island.

Numbered routes included in the study were:

- 1: Aberdeen to Fanling, via Aberdeen Tunnel, Cross-Harbour Tunnel, Lion Rock Tunnel, Tai Po Road
  - 11: Ngau Tau Kok to Butterfly Valley Interchange, via Prince Edward Road East, Prince Edward Road West and Lai Chi Kok Road for westbound, Cheung Sha Wan Road and Boundary Street for eastbound
  - 12: Kowloon City to Mong Kok, via Argyle Street and Cherry Street, connecting to WHC
  - 14: connecting routes 1 and 4, via Choi Hung Road and Po Kong Village Road
- 2: Junction between route 1 and Chatham Road to Sheung Shui, via Gascoigne Road, West Kowloon Corridor, Kwai Chung Road, Tsuen Wan Road, Tuen Mun Road, Castle Peak Road
  - 21: Chatham Road South
  - 22: Ferry Street and Canton Road
  - 23: Nathan Road and Tai Po Road until Tai Wo Ping Interchange
- 3: Junction between route 1 and Chatham Road to Yau Tong via Kai Tak Tunnel (then Airport Tunnel) and Kwun Tong Road
  - 31: Ma Tau Wai Road and Ma Tau Chung Road
- 4: Butterfly Valley Interchange to Kwun Tong, via Ching Cheung Road, Lung Cheung Road and a suggested flyover of what was to become Kwun Tong Bypass
  - 41: Kwun Tong to Tseung Kwan O (then Junk Bay)
  - 42: Choi Hung Interchange to Clear Water Bay
- 5: Kwai Chung to Sha Tin, via what was to become Shing Mun Tunnels
- 6: Castle Peak Road, Kwai Chung and Tsuen Wan sections
- 7: Aberdeen to Causeway Bay, via suggested road between Aberdeen and Kennedy Town, Connaught Road, Harcourt Road and Gloucester Road
  - 71: Pok Fu Lam Road, Third Street and Water Street
- 8: Causeway Bay to Chai Wan via suggested flyover above King's Road; predecessor to present-day Island Eastern Corridor
  - 81: Chai Wan to Wong Chuk Hang by way of Tai Tam and Repulse Bay; never built

=== Second generation ===
The second generation of route numbers came into use in 1974. All distributors lost their numbers, retaining only trunk routes in the system. It was replaced in 2004 by the present-day third generation. At the new system's conception, some numbers were reserved for future road plans at that time. There were 11 routes in the system, of which nine (routes 1 to 9) were used as of 2004.

- 1: Aberdeen to Lok Ma Chau, 47.3 km, previously route 1. Split into routes 1 and 9
- 2: Ngau Tau Kok to San Tin, 54.4 km, previously routes 2 and 3. Split into routes 5 and 9
- 3: Sai Ying Pun to Au Tau, 27.7 km. Still route 3 today
- 4: Lai Chi Kok to Tseung Kwan O, via Kwun Tong Road, 17 km. Today's route 7
- 5: Tsuen Wan to Sha Tin Racecourse, 9.5 km. Part of route 9 today
- 6: Tai Koo Shing to Ma Liu Shui, via Kwun Tong Bypass and Tate's Cairn Tunnel, 19.5 km. Today's route 2
- 7: Causeway Bay to Aberdeen, 13.5 km, previously also route 7. Merged with route 8 to form today's route 4
- 8: Island Eastern Corridor, 9.6 km, previously also route 8. Merged with route 7 to form today's route 4
- 9: Chek Lap Kok to Tai Wai, 33.7 km. Today's route 8
- 10: Green Island to Shenzhen Bay, 29.5 km. Still route 10 today
- 11: West Kowloon to Tseung Kwan O, via Central Kowloon Route, 14 km. Today's route 6; the Yau Ma Tei section opened to traffic on 21 December 2025.

=== Third generation ===
The third generation of route numbers came into use in 2004, and is the numbering system currently being used.

== See also ==
- Exit number
- Road number
