= Deep Bay, China =

Bay between Hong Kong and Shenzhen, China

Coordinates: 22.4992°N 113.9701°E

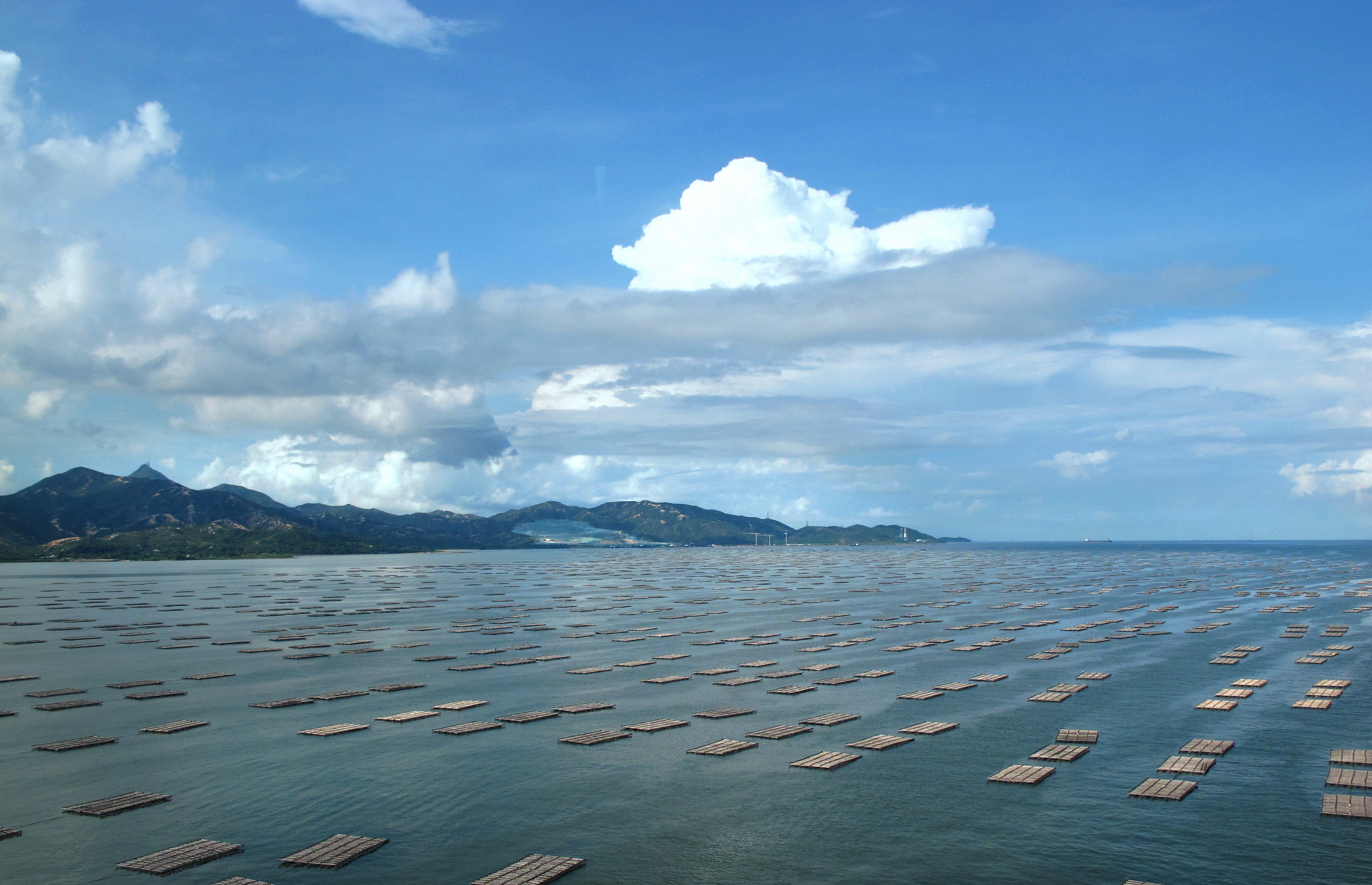
- Traditional Chinese: 后海灣
- Simplified Chinese: 后海湾
Transcriptions
Standard Mandarin
- Hanyu Pinyin: Hòuhǎi Wān
Hakka
- Romanization: Hiu^{4}hoi^{3} Van^{1}
Yue: Cantonese
- Yale Romanization: Haauh hói wāan
- Jyutping: Hau6 hoi2 waan1

Shenzhen Bay
- Traditional Chinese: 深圳灣
- Simplified Chinese: 深圳湾
Transcriptions
Standard Mandarin
- Hanyu Pinyin: Shēnzhèn Wān
Yue: Cantonese
- Yale Romanization: Sām jan wāan
- Jyutping: Sam1 zan3 waan1

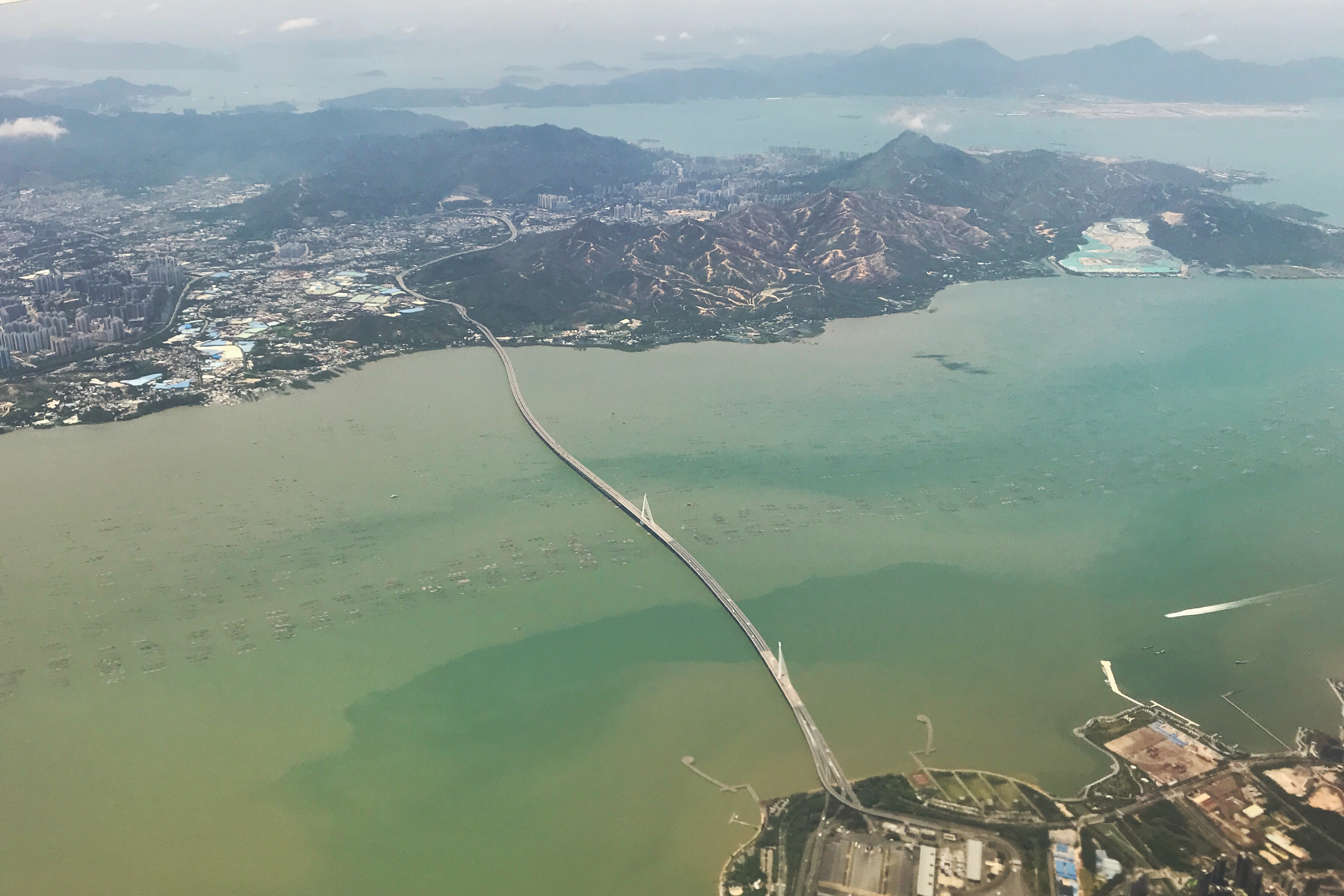
Shenzhen Bay Bridge crossing Deep Bay.

Deep Bay is a bay between Yuen Long District, in the New Territories, Hong Kong, and the city of Shenzhen in Guangdong Province. It is otherwise known as Hau Hoi Wan (Chinese: 后海灣) in Hong Kong, and Shenzhen Bay (Chinese: 深圳湾) in mainland China.

== Name ==
The local Cantonese name of the bay is Hau Hoi Wan (后海灣), which means the back (sea) bay. It is opposite to another bay, Tsin Hoi Wan (Chinese: 前海灣; pinyin: Qiánhǎiwān), which means front (sea) bay, on the other side of Nantau Peninsula. The Chinese character 后 (Hau, lit. queen) in 后海灣 is the homonym of 後 (Hau, lit. back), and also its simplified character. Some attribute the character 后 (Hau) to the goddess of sea and seafarers, Tin Hau (天后).

The name of Shenzhen Bay came much later, at least after the establishment of Shenzhen Special Economic Zone in 1980. The name became more notable after a hotel was named 'Shenzhen Bay'. While the government of China uses the name widely, the people and government in Hong Kong continue to use the official name (后海灣).

== Ecology ==
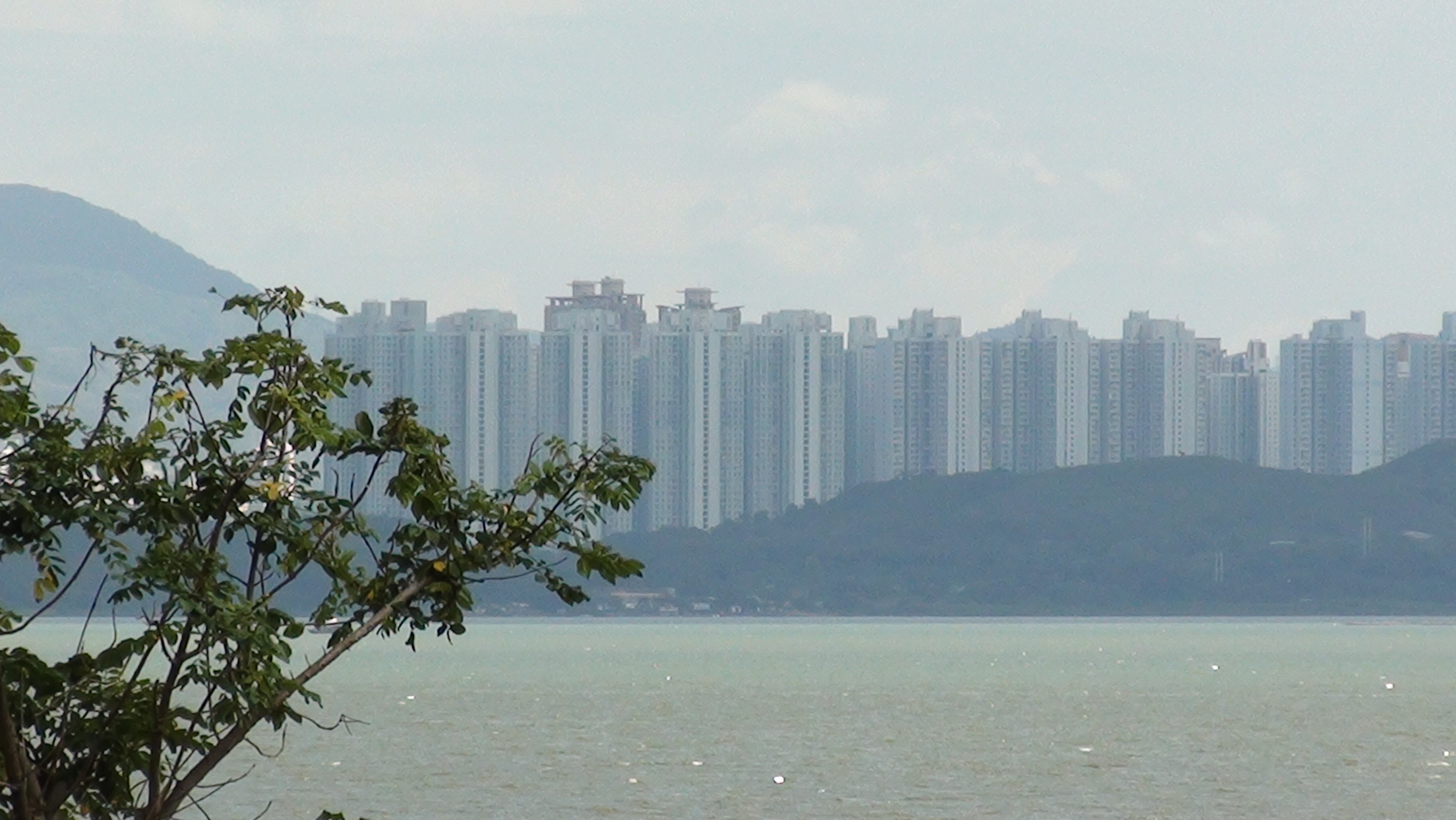
View of Tin Shui Wai in fog from Shenzhen side through the Bay

As the bay is largely enclosed by land, fresh water from the surrounding land enters the bay from a shallow shore of wetland. The margin of fresh water and salt water forms a valuable habitat for a wide variety of life.

The bay's northern shore used to be lined with marshes. As Shenzhen began to develop into a major urban centre, the northern shoreline was reclaimed to provide land for buildings. Some departments had tried to preserve the endangered environment but mistakenly introduced foreign species of mangrove, which threatened their indigenous counterparts.

The marshes remain largely intact along the southern part of the bay, which is under Hong Kong's jurisdiction. Mai Po is an important habitat for migrating birds in the area and is the site where the Mai Po bent-wing firefly (Pteroptyx maipo) was discovered. Pools of former fish farms is another attraction to birds. Like many coastal areas, it is at risk of sea level rise due to climate change, which would damage the roots of the mangroves.

== Agriculture and fisheries ==
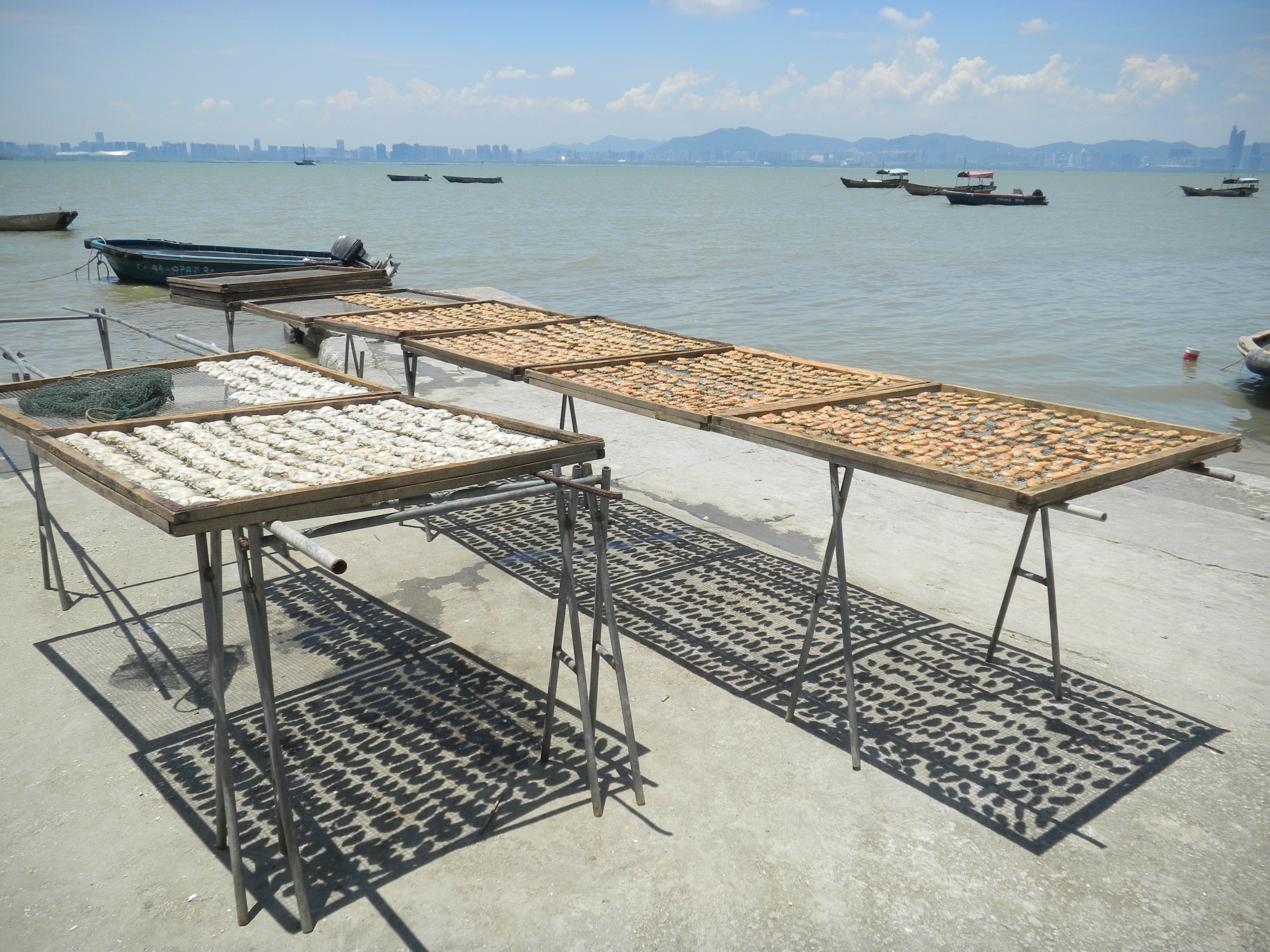
Sun dried oysters in Lau Fau Shan looking towards Shenzhen

The bay is rich in fish and oysters. Lau Fau Shan is particularly famous for oysters in Hong Kong. From Lau Fau Shan to Mai Po, the villagers made use of the special environment's pools to cultivate fishes. A by-product of this cultivation, greasyback shrimp (基圍蝦), is also a delicacy in Hong Kong.

== Illegal immigrants ==
Before 1949, Chinese people were free to travel between Hong Kong and mainland China. In order to halt a large influx of refugees from mainland China, the Hong Kong Government established border control and compulsory registration of Hong Kong residents.

As a result, it was harder to migrate to Hong Kong than before and thus many crossed the border illegally. Deep Bay became the main access for illegal immigrants because border controls were harder to enforce at sea. It was relatively easy to cross the bay and there were major roads to the urban centres of Hong Kong. The rural town of Lau Fau Shan was the major landing point.

== Conservation ==
- A part of "Inner Deep Bay", covering 1,036 hectares, was designated as a Site of Special Scientific Interest of Hong Kong in 1986.

== See also ==
- List of bays in Hong Kong
- Agriculture and aquaculture in Hong Kong
- Qianhai, the commercial district of Shenzhen named after 'front bay'
- Hong Kong–Shenzhen Western Corridor, the bridge crossing the Deep Bay from Shenzhen to Hong Kong
