= Tai Shui Hang =

Area of Hong Kong

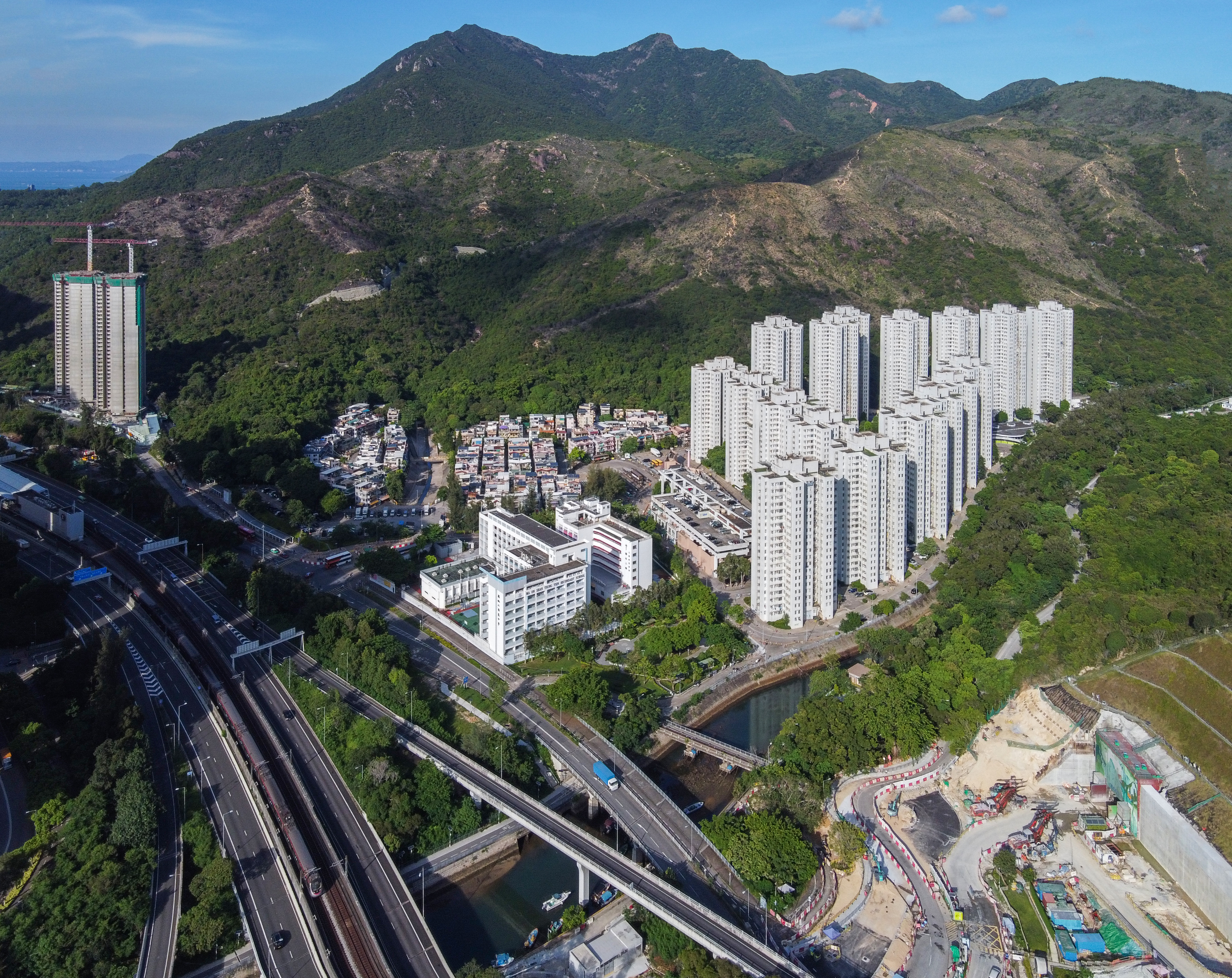
View of Tai Shui Hang, with Ma On Shan peak in the background.

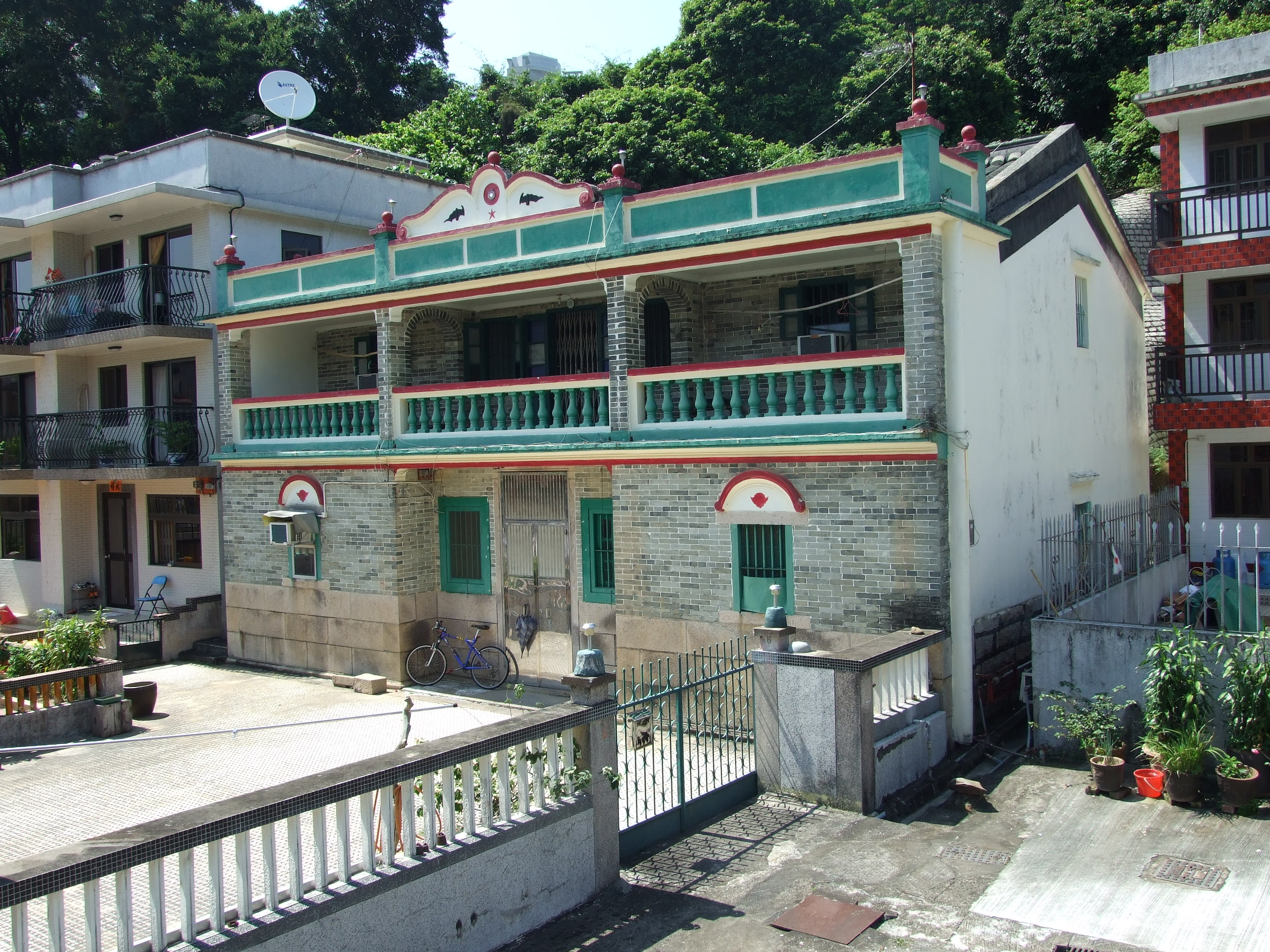
Cheung Village House, No. 6 Tai Shui Hang Village.

Tai Shui Hang (Chinese: 大水坑) is an area in Ma On Shan, Sha Tin District, New Territories, Hong Kong.

Tai Shui Hang Village (大水坑村; 'Big Stream Village') is a historic village within the area.

== See also ==
- Chevalier Garden
- Kam Tai Court
- Mountain Shore
- Tak Sun Secondary School
- Tai Shui Hang station
- Turret Hill aka. Nui Po Shan
