= Mountain Shore =

Private housing estate in Hong Kong

Coordinates: 22.4105°N 114.2222°E

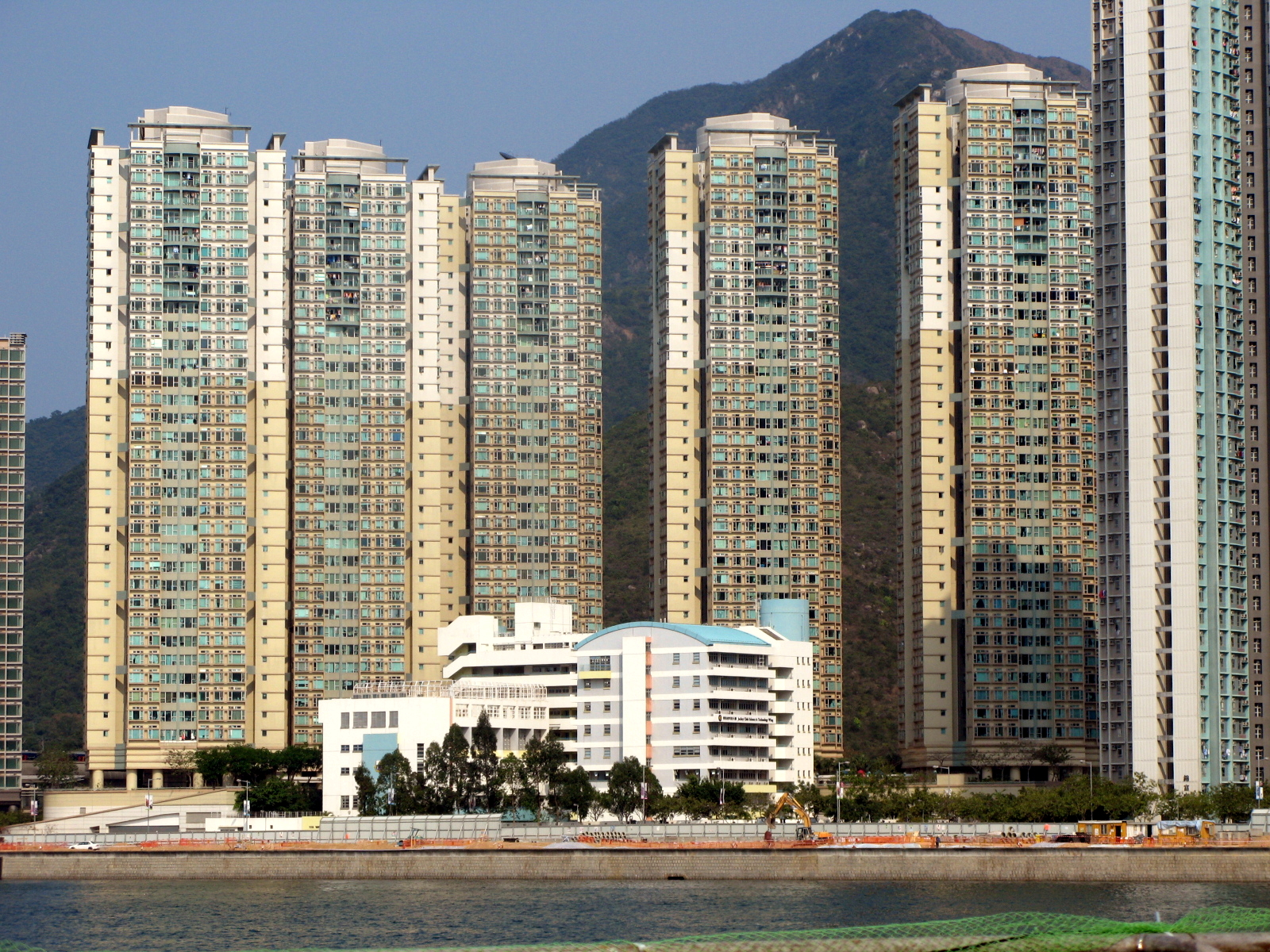
Mountain Shore along Tide Cove.

Mountain Shore (Chinese: 曉峯灣畔) is a full market value development in Tai Shui Hang, Ma On Shan, Sha Tin District, New Territories, Hong Kong. The estate is one of the Hong Kong Housing Society's Sandwich Class Housing Scheme projects converted into private developments.

The housing estate is built along Tide Cove. It comprises five high-rise buildings with a total of 1,124 units. It was developed by Hong Kong Housing Society in 2002. All units were initially sold within 9 hours in April 2002 at an average price of HK$2,900 per sq. ft.

== Transport ==
MTR

- Tuen Ma line Tai Shui Hang station

Buses

Buses serving Mountain Shore

Kowloon Motor Bus

- 40S - Nai Chung → Kwai Chung (Kwai Fong Estate) (Morning Rush Time Service)
- 40X - Wu Kai Sha Station ↔ Kwai Chung Estate
- 43X - Tsuen Wan West Station ↔ Yiu On
- 81C - Yiu On ↔ Tsim Sha Tsui East (Mody Road)
- 85K - Heng On ↔ Sha Tin Station
- 85M - Kam Ying Court ↺ Wong Tai Sin
- 85S - Yiu On → Hung Hom (Hung Luen Road) (Morning Rush Time Service)
- 85X - Ma On Shan Town Centre ↔ Hung Hom (Hung Luen Road)
- 86C - Ma On Shan (Lee On) ↔ Cheung Sha Wan
- 86K - Kam Ying Court ↔ Sha Tin Station
- 86S - Kam Ying Court ↔ Sha Tin Station (Rush Time Service)
- 87D - Kam Ying Court ↔ Hung Hom Station
- 89C - Heng On ↔ Kwun Tong (Tsui Ping Road)
- 89D - Wu Kai Sha Station ↔ Lam Tin station
- 89P - Ma On Shan Town Centre → Lam Tin Station (Morning Rush Time Service)
- 274 - Sheung Shui (Tai Ping) → Wu Kai Sha Station (Morning Rush Time Service)
- 281X - Yiu On → Tsim Sha Tsui East (Mody Road) (Morning Rush Time Service)
- 286C - Ma On Shan (Lee On) ↔ Cheung Sha Wan (Sham Mong Road)
- 286M - Ma On Shan Town Centre ↺ Diamond Hill station
- 289K - University Station ↺ Chevalier Garden
- 299X - Sai Kung ↔ Shatin Central
- N281 - Hung Hom Station ↔ Kam Ying Court (Midnight Service)
- N287 - Tsim Sha Tsui East (Mody Road) → Wu Kai Sha Station (Midnight Service)

Cross Harbour Tunnel Bus

- 680 - Lee On ↔ Admiralty (East)
- 680A - Lee On → Admiralty (East) (Morning Rush Time Service)
- 680P - Ma On Shan Town Centre → Admiralty (East) (Morning Rush Time Service)
- 681P - Yiu On ↔ Sheung Wan (Rush Time Service)
- 682 - Ma On Shan (Wu Kai Sha Station) ↔ Chai Wan (East)
- 682A - Ma On Shan Town Centre/Nai Chung ↔ Chai Wan (East) (Rush Time Service)
- 980X - Wu Kai Sha Station ↔ Wan Chai/Admiralty (East) (Rush Time Service)
- 981P - Yiu On ↔ Wan Chai/Admiralty (East) (Rush Time Service)
- N680 - Kam Ying Court ↔ Central (Macau Ferry) (Midnight Service)

Long Win Bus

- A41P - Airport (Ground Transportation Centre) ↔ Ma On Shan (Wu Kai Sha Station)
- N42 - Tung Chung Station ↔ Ma On Shan (Yiu On) (Midnight Service)
- NA40 - Hong Kong-Zhuhai-Macao Bridge Hong Kong Port ↔ Ma On Shan (Wu Kai Sha Station) (Midnight Service)
