= Sha Tin Sewage Treatment Works =

Sewage treatment facility in Hong Kong

Coordinates: 22.4066°N 114.2136°E

- Traditional Chinese: 沙田污水處理廠
- Simplified Chinese: 沙田污水处理厂
Transcriptions
Standard Mandarin
- Hanyu Pinyin: Shātián Wūshuǐchǔlǐchǎng
Yue: Cantonese
- Jyutping: saa1 tin4 wu1 seoi2 cyu2 lei5 cong2

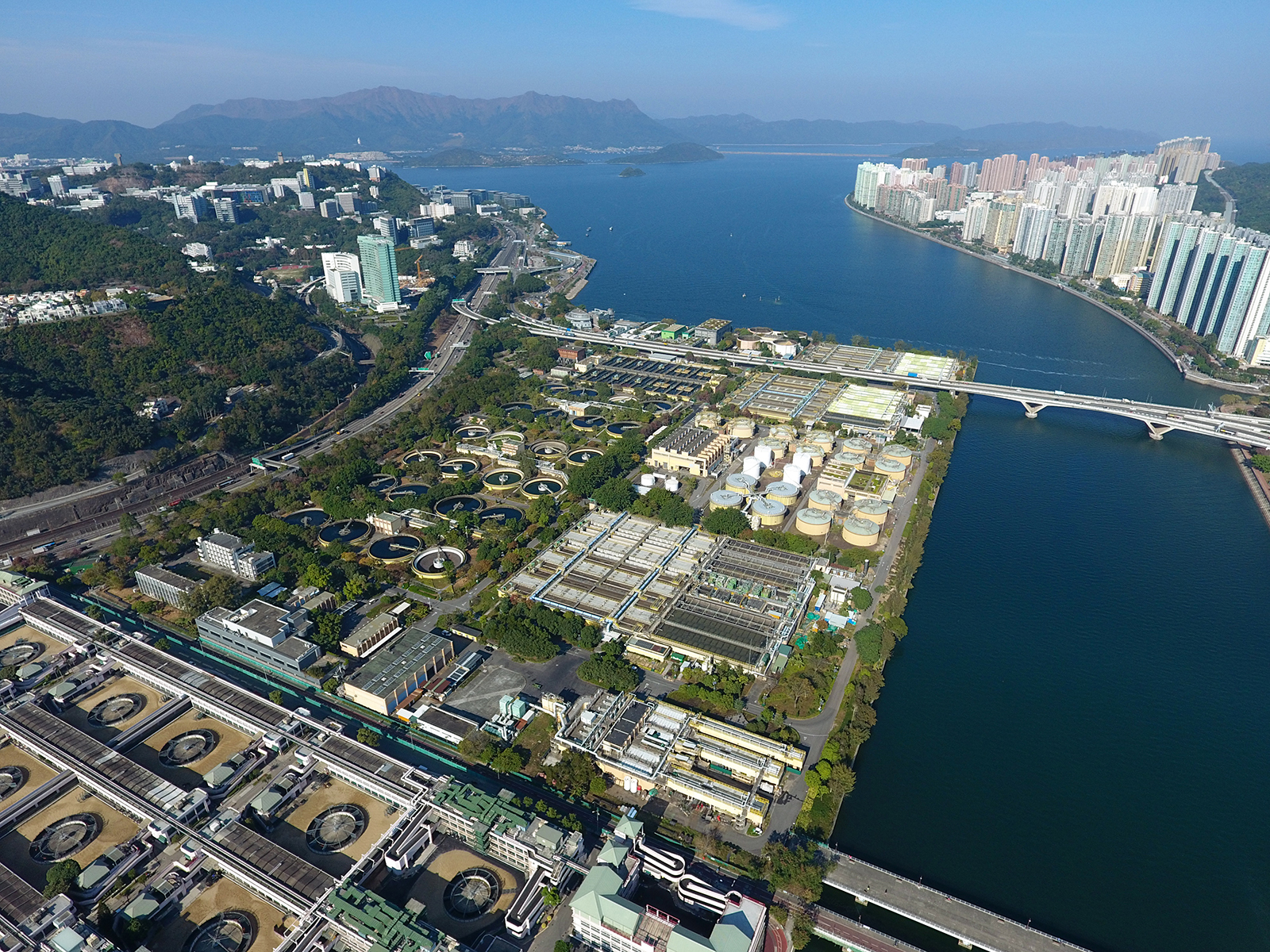
Overview of Sha Tin Sewage Treatment Works. Sha Tin Hoi and Ma On Shan are in the background.

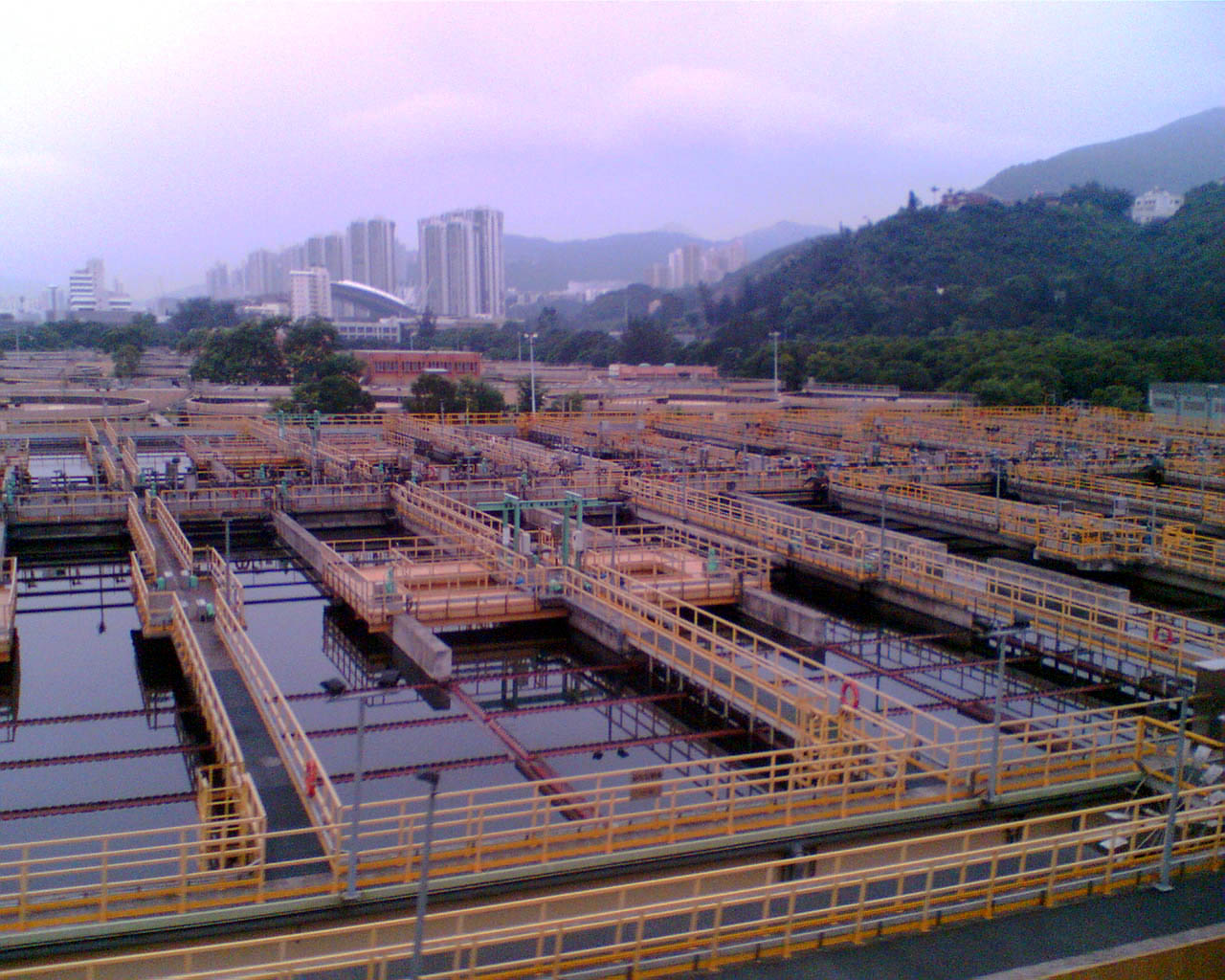
Sha Tin Sewage Treatment Works

Sha Tin Sewage Treatment Works (Chinese: 沙田污水處理廠) is a sewage treatment facility in Hong Kong. It is located in Ma Liu Shui, Sha Tin, along the Shing Mun River, at its mouth into Sha Tin Hoi (Tide Cove).

The treatment works serves Sha Tin, Ma On Shan and the villages nearby. The plant is managed by the Drainage Services Department.

It was then extended in several stages. Stage I was first commissioned in 1982 with stage II following in 1986. Stage III was completed in September 2004.

Construction work to move the sewage treatment facility to an artificial cave within Nui Po Shan, a nearby mountain, started in 2021.
