= Tak Sun Secondary School =

Coordinates: 22.41031°N 114.22189°E

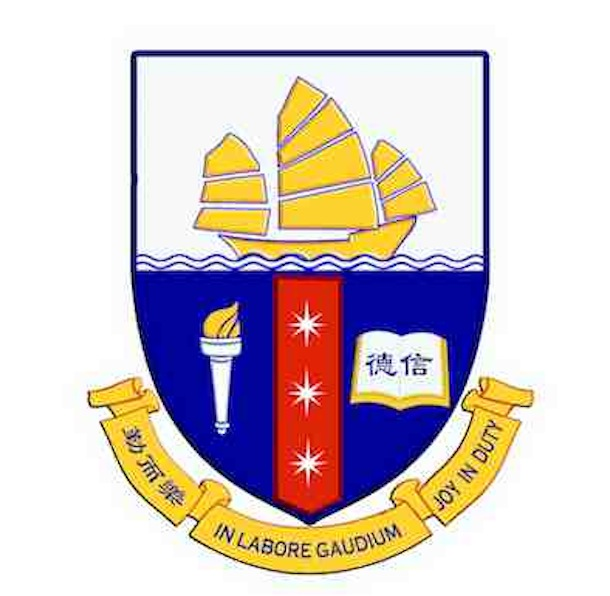

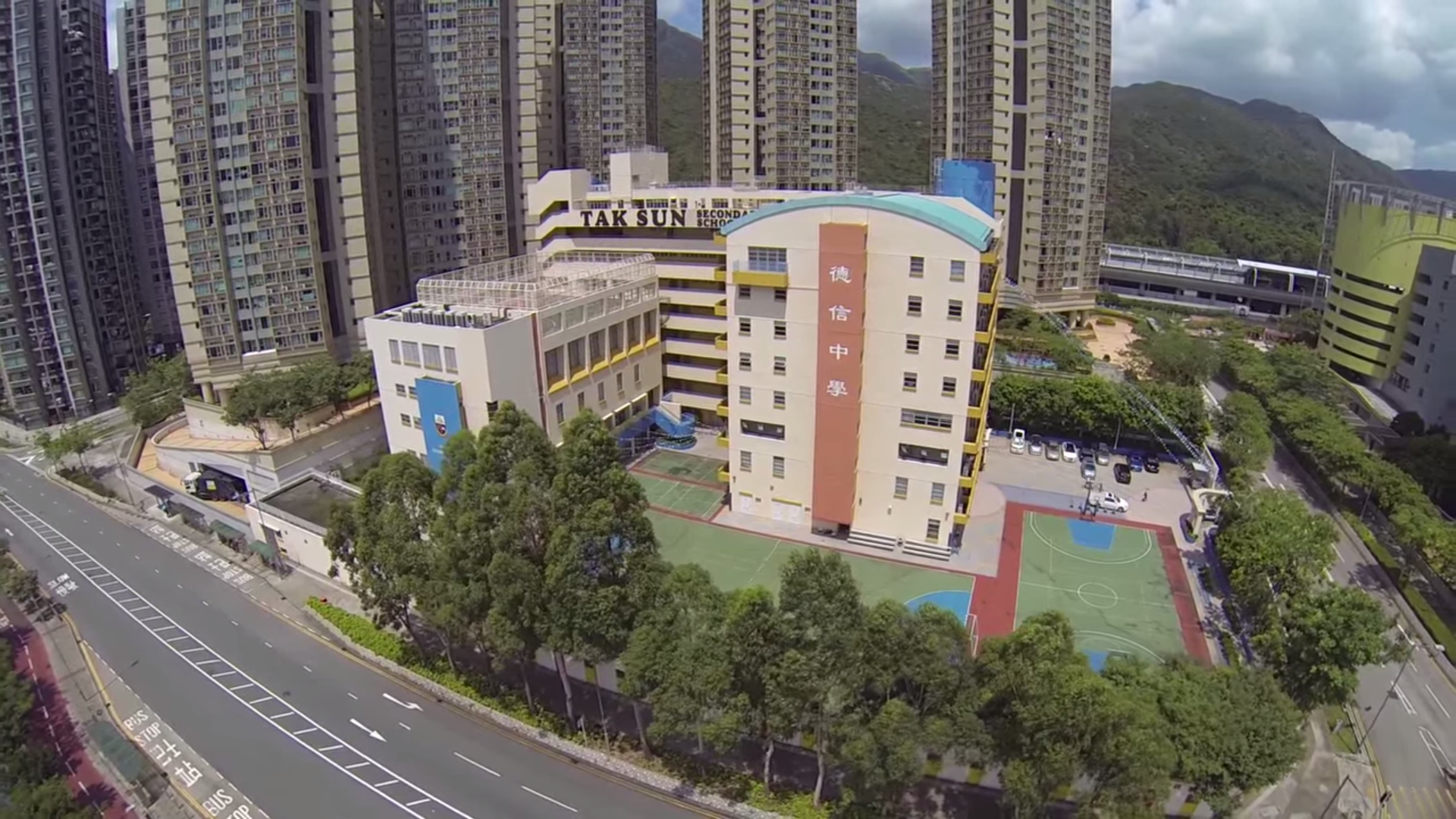

Location
- 27 Ning Tai Road, Ma On Shan, Sha Tin District, New Territories, Hong Kong

Information
- Type: DSS Boys School
- Motto: In Labore Gaudium (Latin); Joy in Duty 勤而樂 (Chinese)
- Religious affiliation: Roman Catholic
- Established: 2000; 26 years ago
- President: Dr. Peter M. Herbert
- Principal: Dennis Law
- Vice principals: Mervyn Lam, Eric Kwan
- Faculty: 66
- Enrollment: 950
- Language: English, Chinese
- Area: 11,680 Square Metres
- Affiliation: East Asian Educational Association; Opus Dei
- Houses: Piccard; Nansen; Scott; Hillary
- Patron saint: Saint Josemaría Escrivá
- Website: tsss.edu.hk

Tak Sun Secondary School (TSSS; Chinese: 德信中學 demonym: Tak Sun Boy) is a directly subsidized, English as a Medium of Instruction, boys' school located at Tai Shui Hang, Ma On Shan, Sha Tin, New Territories, Hong Kong. The institution was established in 2000.

Tak Sun is founded on Catholic Christian values, incorporates the involvement of parents in the education of their children and encourages their own personal growth as parents.

== History ==
The school was named "Tak Sun" to complete the theological virtues of Faith, Hope, and Love; the former two of which are the names of the other MIC schools in Hong Kong[1] (Tak Oi School [zh] and Good Hope School).

In March 2006, the school invited a comprehensive review of its activities by the Faculty of Education of the University of Hong Kong. The resulting report was generally positive, but it identified deficiencies in academic rigour that required addressing.

== School facilities ==
The school has a multimedia learning center, student activity center, a comprehensive learning center, language rooms, auditorium, laboratories, computer rooms, a library, a fitness room, football court, handball court, basketball court, an art room, badminton courts, athletics track and a small chapel.
