= Tai Shui Hang Village =

Village in Hong Kong

Coordinates: 22.406282°N 114.224047°E

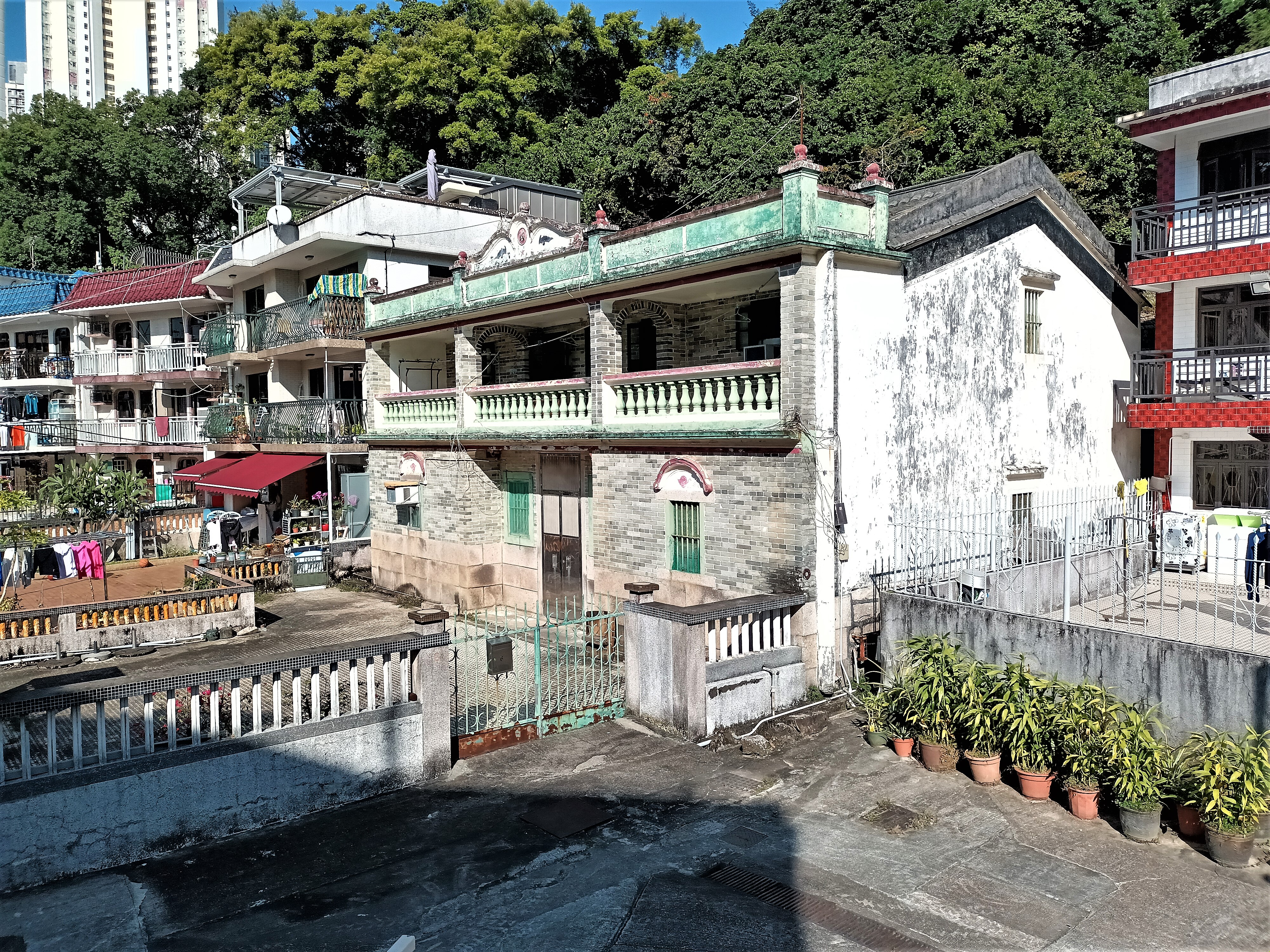
Cheung Village House, No. 6 Tai Shui Hang.

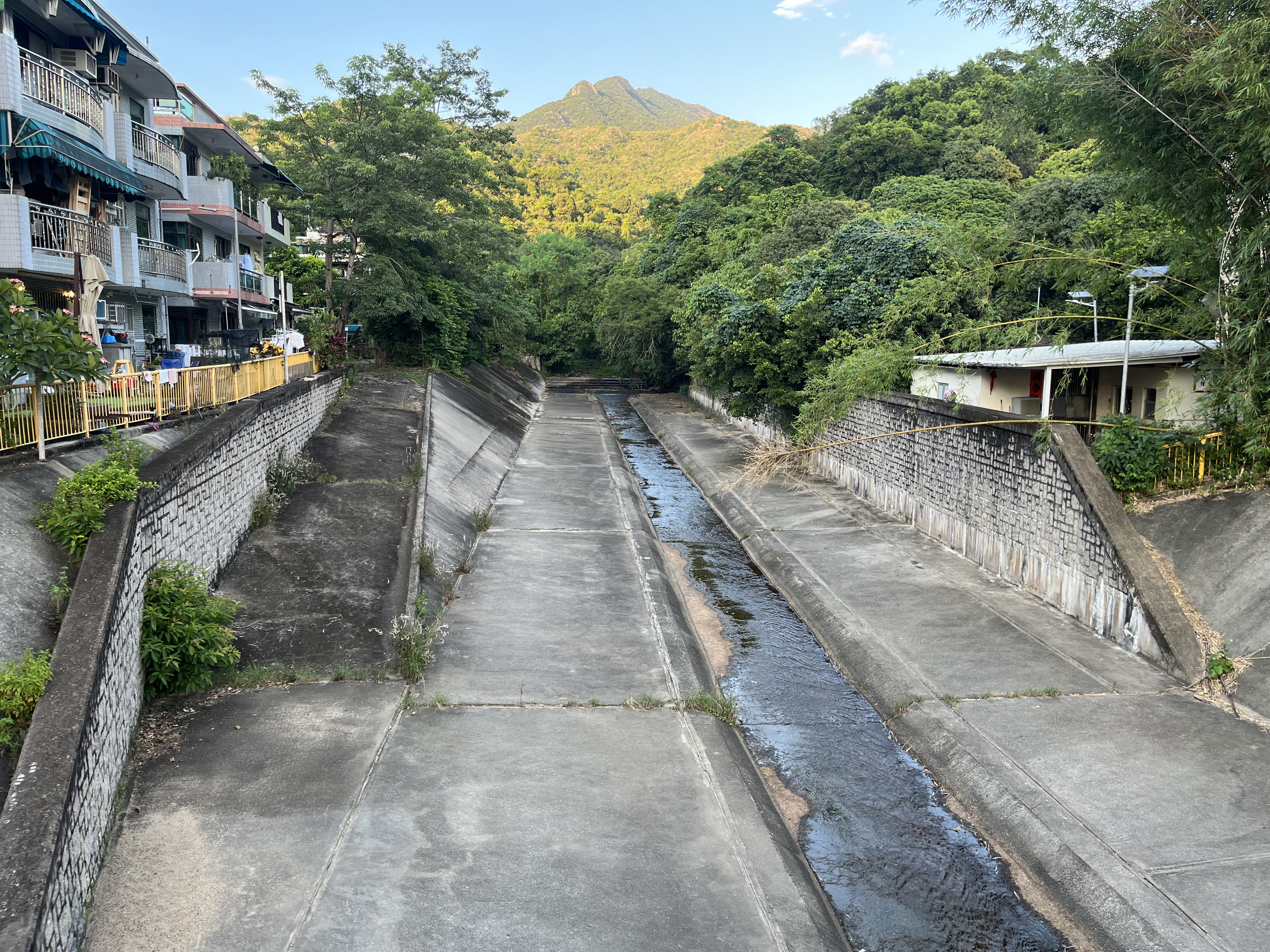
Ma Tai Stream (馬大石澗) in Tai Shui Hang Village.

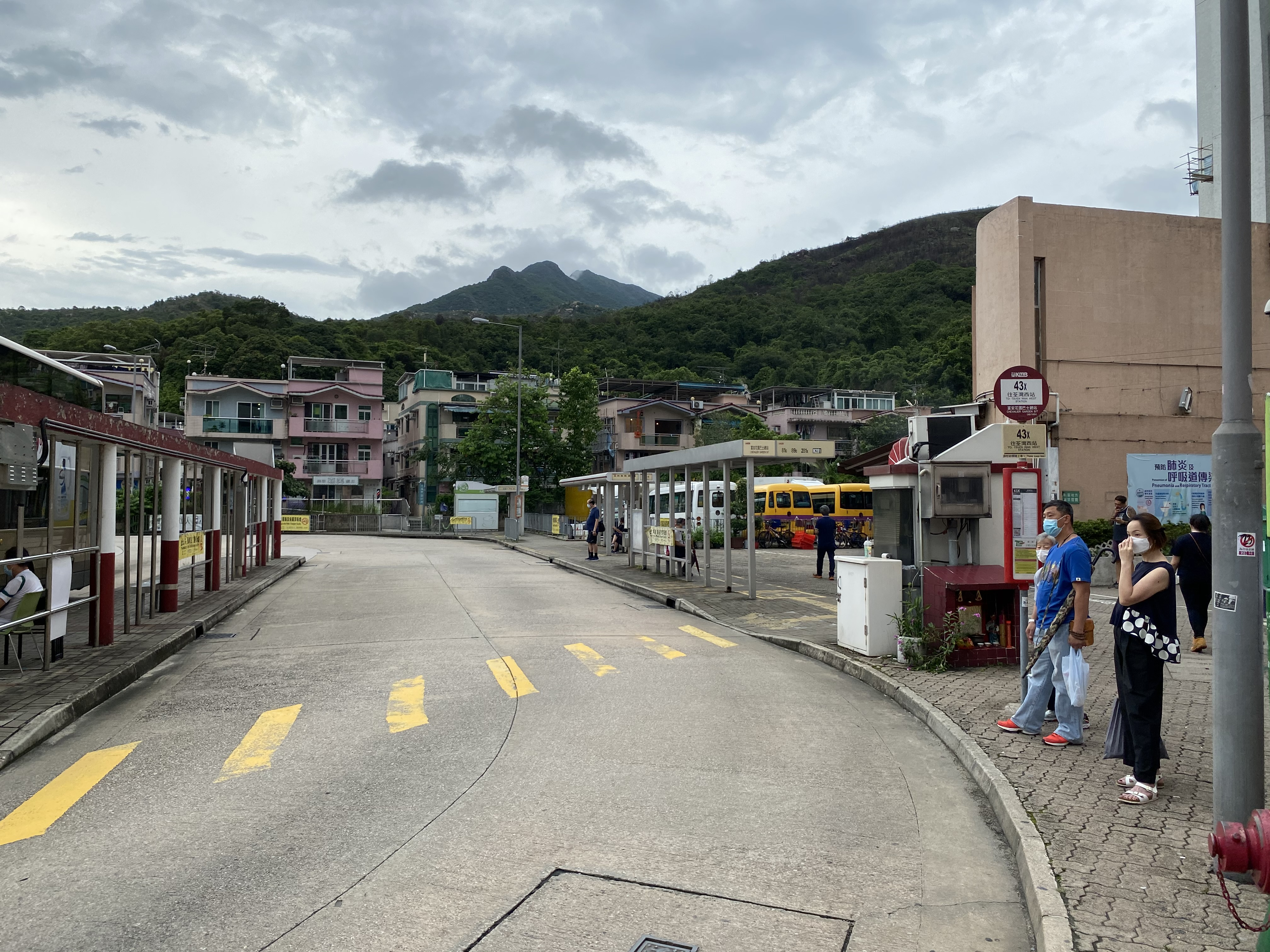
Chevalier Garden Bus Terminus at Tai Shui Hang Village.

Tai Shui Hang Village (Chinese: 大水坑村; lit. 'Big Stream Village') is a historic village within the Tai Shui Hang area, in Ma On Shan, Sha Tin District, New Territories, Hong Kong.

== Administration ==
Tai Shui Hang Village is a recognized village under the New Territories Small House Policy.

== Transportation ==
Tai Shui Hang Village is served by the Tai Shui Hang station of the MTR and the Chevalier Garden Bus Terminus.
