= Turret Hill =

Mountain in Hong Kong

- 女婆山
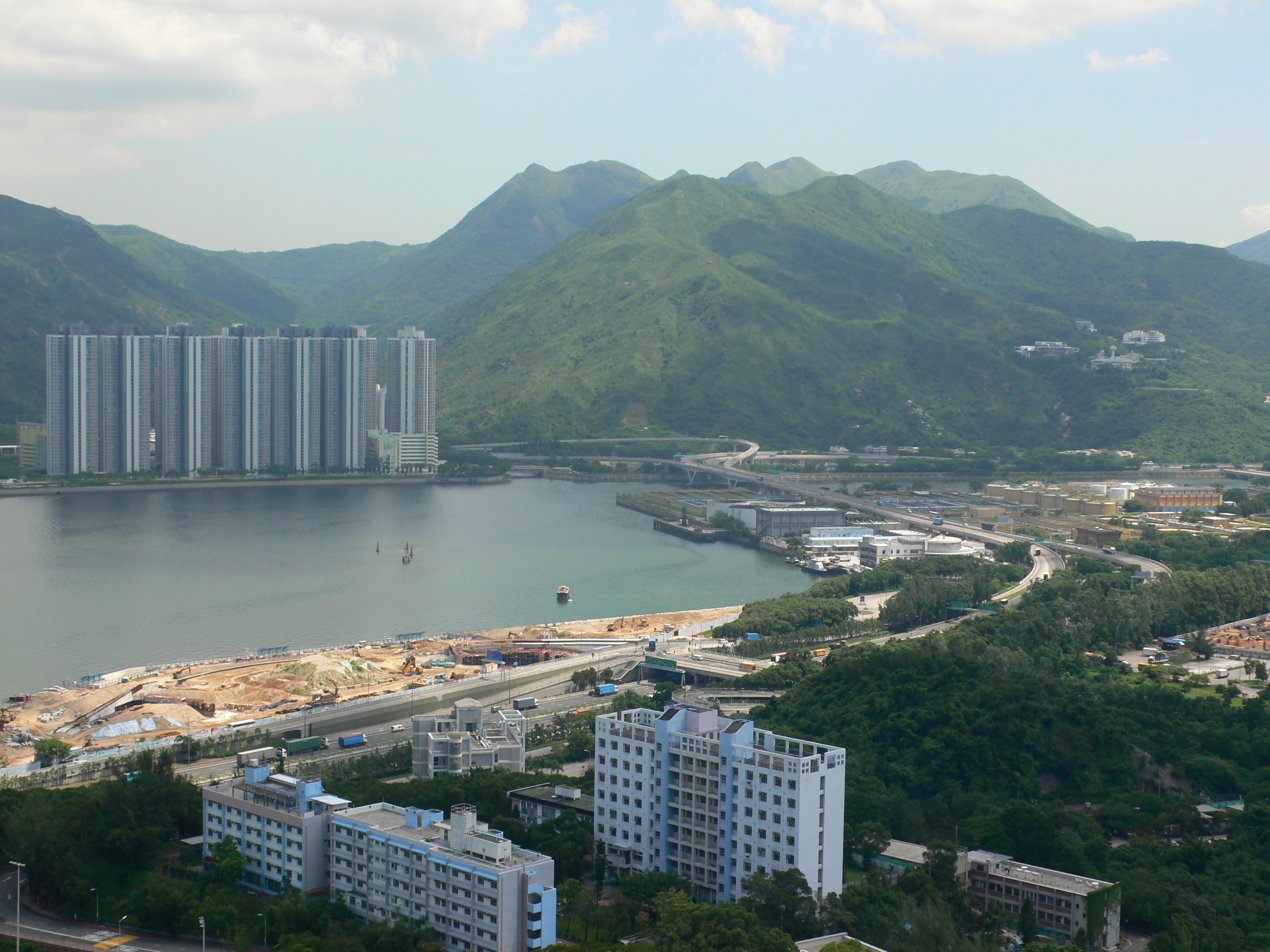
- View of Tide Cove, with Nui Po Shan in the centre of the picture. The current Sha Tin Sewage Treatment Works is visible in the centre right.

Highest point
- Elevation: 399 m (1,309 ft)
- Coordinates: 22°23′29″N 114°13′27″E

Geography
- Location within Hong Kong
- Location: Hong Kong

Turret Hill (Chinese: 女婆山), also known as Nui Po Shan, is a peak southeast of Tolo Harbour in the New Territories of Hong Kong. It has a height of 399 metres. The mountain is located in the Sha Tin District.

== History ==
A quarry named Turret Hill Quarry was located on the southeastern flank of Turret Hill. Established in the mid-1960s, it initially served as a borrow area, and was converted into an aggregate quarry in the late 1970s. Rock extraction ceased at the quarry in 1984.

Construction work to move the nearby Sha Tin Sewage Treatment Works to an artificial cave within Nui Po Shan started in 2021.

== See also ==
- List of mountains, peaks and hills in Hong Kong
- Ma On Shan Country Park
- Mining in Hong Kong
