= Tide Cove =

Cove in Hong Kong

Coordinates: 22°25′01″N 114°13′09″E

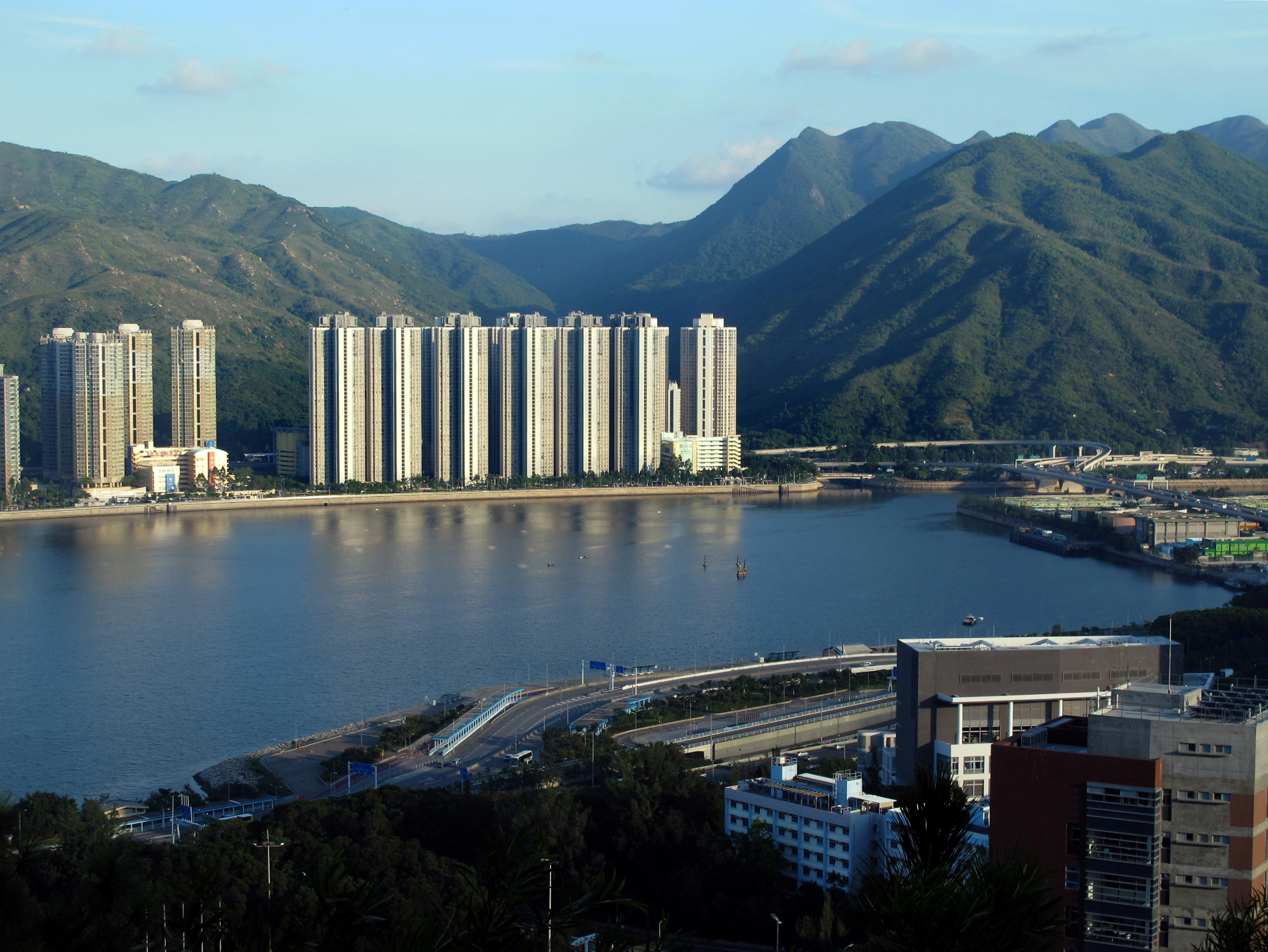
Tide Cove in 2012

Sha Tin Hoi / Sha Tin Sea (Chinese: 沙田海; Jyutping: saa1 tin4 hoi2) or Tide Cove is a cove at the mouth of the Shing Mun River. It is between Ma Liu Shui and Ma On Shan. The cove is open to Tolo Harbour (Tai Po Hoi). It was largely reclaimed for the development of Sha Tin New Town.

Tide Cove may shrink further in the future, as the government is exploring further land reclamation at Ma Liu Shui.

== See also ==
- Sha Tin Sewage Treatment Works
- Mountain Shore
