= Four hills of Kowloon =

Historic granite quarries in Hong Kong

- Traditional Chinese: 九龍四山
- Simplified Chinese: 九龙四山
- Cantonese Yale: gáu lùhng sei sāan
Transcriptions
Standard Mandarin
- Hanyu Pinyin: Jiǔlóng Sì Shān
Yue: Cantonese
- Yale Romanization: gáu lùhng sei sāan
- Jyutping: gau2 lung4 sei3 saan1

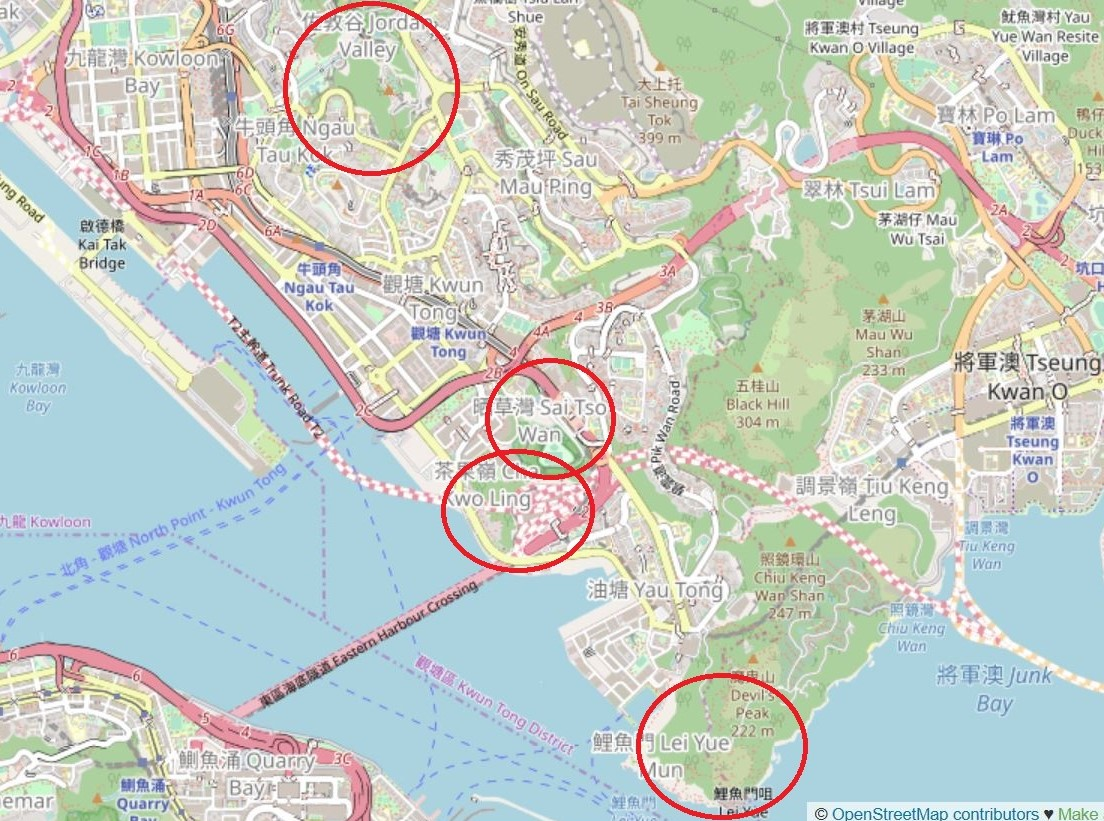
Location of the former quarries of the Four hills of Kowloon

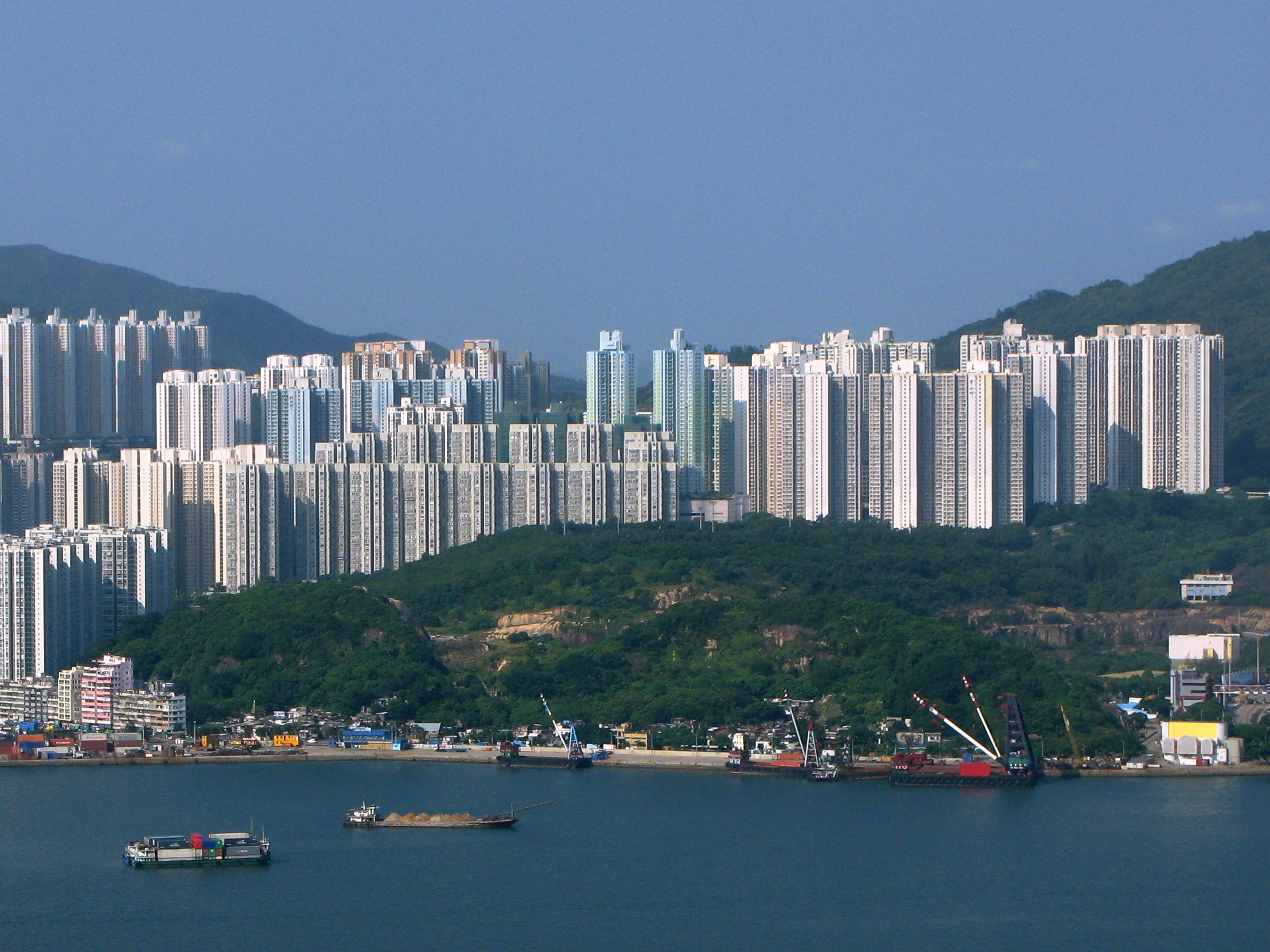
High rises of Lam Tin. The village of Cha Kwo Ling is near the shore. The historical quarry is visible on the hill in between.

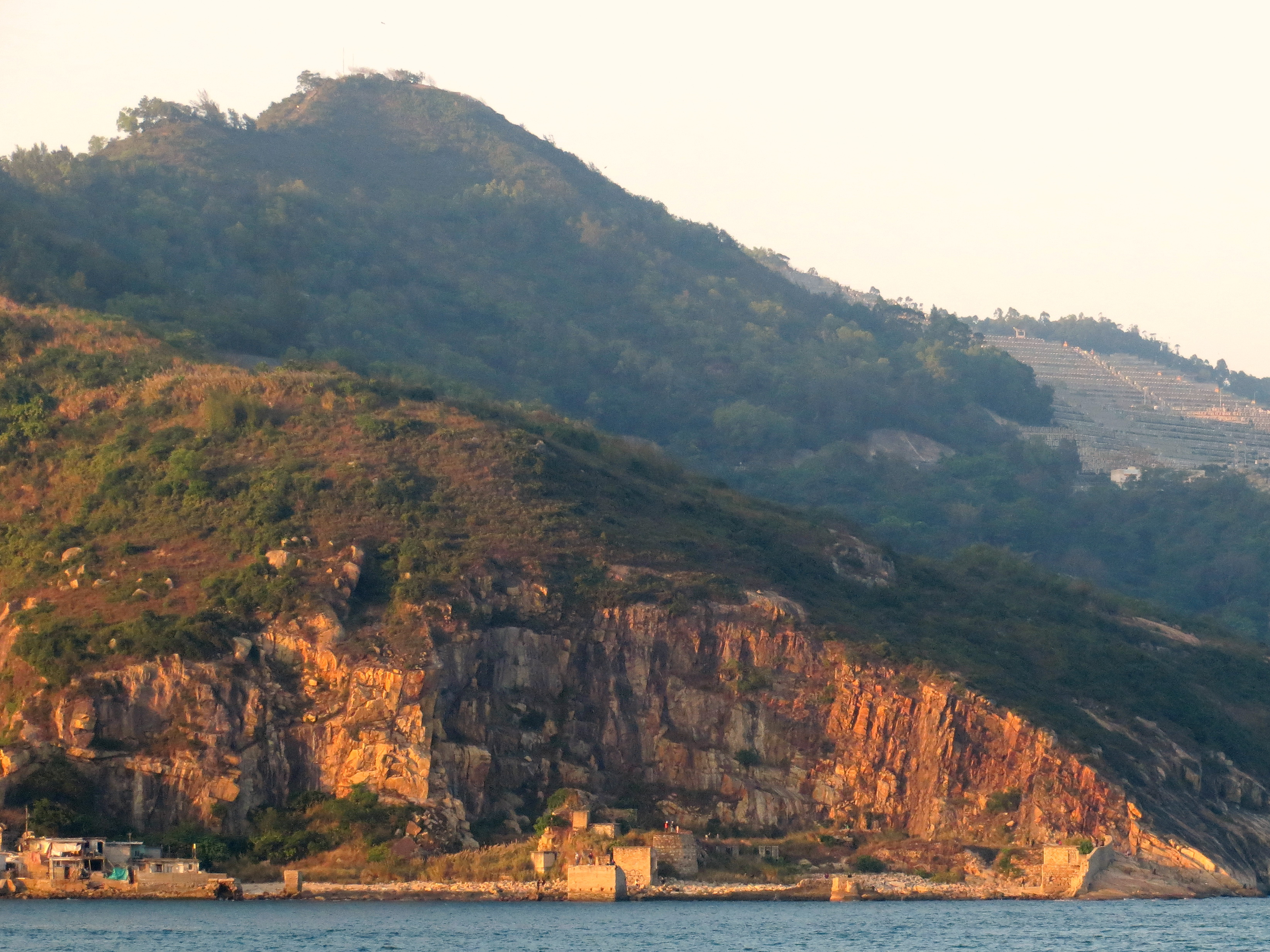
Distant view of the Old Quarry Site Structures in Lei Yue Mun (Kowloon).

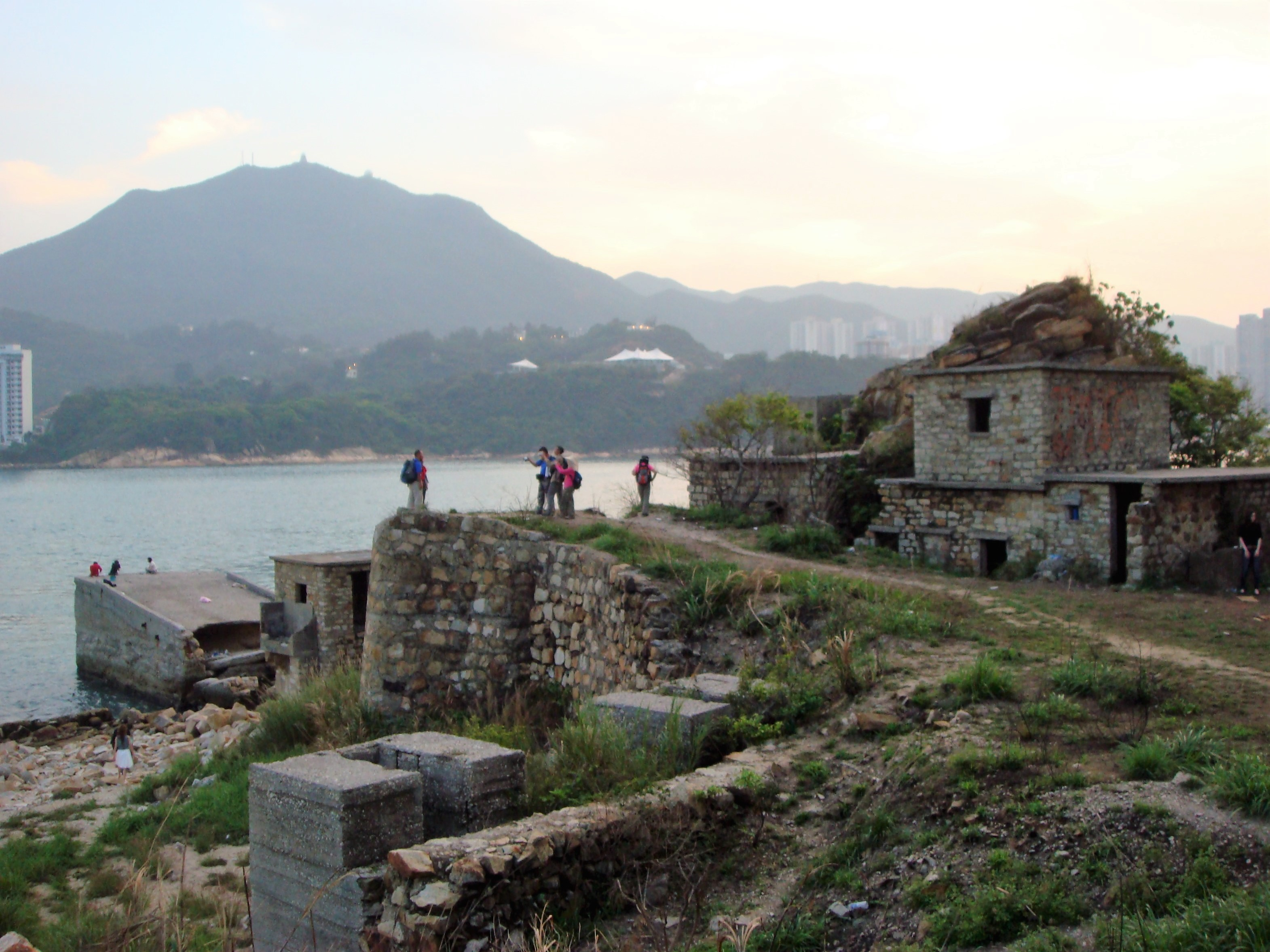
Old Quarry Site Structures in Lei Yue Mun (Kowloon).

The Four Hills of Kowloon (Chinese: 九龍四山) are four hills that were historically the site of granite quarries in Kwun Tong District, New Kowloon, Hong Kong.

== History ==
At the end of the 18th century, Hakka settled into the Cha Kwo Ling area, and quarrying became their main occupation. By that time, the villages of Cha Kwo Ling, Ngau Tau Kok, Sai Tso Wan and Lei Yue Mun were collectively called Sze Shan (四山, "Four Hills"). According to a missionary who visited the area in 1844, tens of quarries were in operation along the two miles stretch in eastern Kowloon. In the early 20th century there were said to be more than 10 quarries in the Ngau Tau Kok section of the "Four Hills" alone, each employing 10 to 20 people, all Hakka with origins in the East River area of northeastern Guangdong.

The Qing government appointed a headman for each "hill", in charge of ruling the area and collecting tax. The four headmen were collectively referred to as the Sze Shan Tau Yan (四山頭人, "Headmen of Four Hills"). The four villages also formed the Sze Shan Kung So (四山公所, "Communal Hall of Four Hills"), managing the quarrying business. The headmen system ended before World War II.

The granite blocks extracted from the Four Hills were exported via sailboat, and several piers were built along the coast. The one at Sai Tso Wan was the biggest. Today, only parts of the Lei Yue Mun pier remain.

== Conservation ==
The Old Quarry Site Structures at Lei Yue Mun (Kowloon) have been listed as Grade III historic buildings.

== See also ==
- Mining in Hong Kong
- Sacred Heart Cathedral (Guangzhou), built with granite from the Four hills of Kowloon.
- Choi Hei Road Park (彩禧路公園), Choi Fook Estate (彩福邨), Choi Tak Estate and Choi Ying Estate in Ngau Tau Kok, a granite theme park and a public housing estates built on the site of the former Ping Shan Quarry.
