= Sai Tso Wan, Kowloon =

Former bay in Kowloon, Hong Kong

- Traditional Chinese: 晒草灣
- Simplified Chinese: 晒草湾
Transcriptions
Standard Mandarin
- Hanyu Pinyin: Shài Cǎo Wān
Yue: Cantonese
- Jyutping: saai3 cou2 waan1

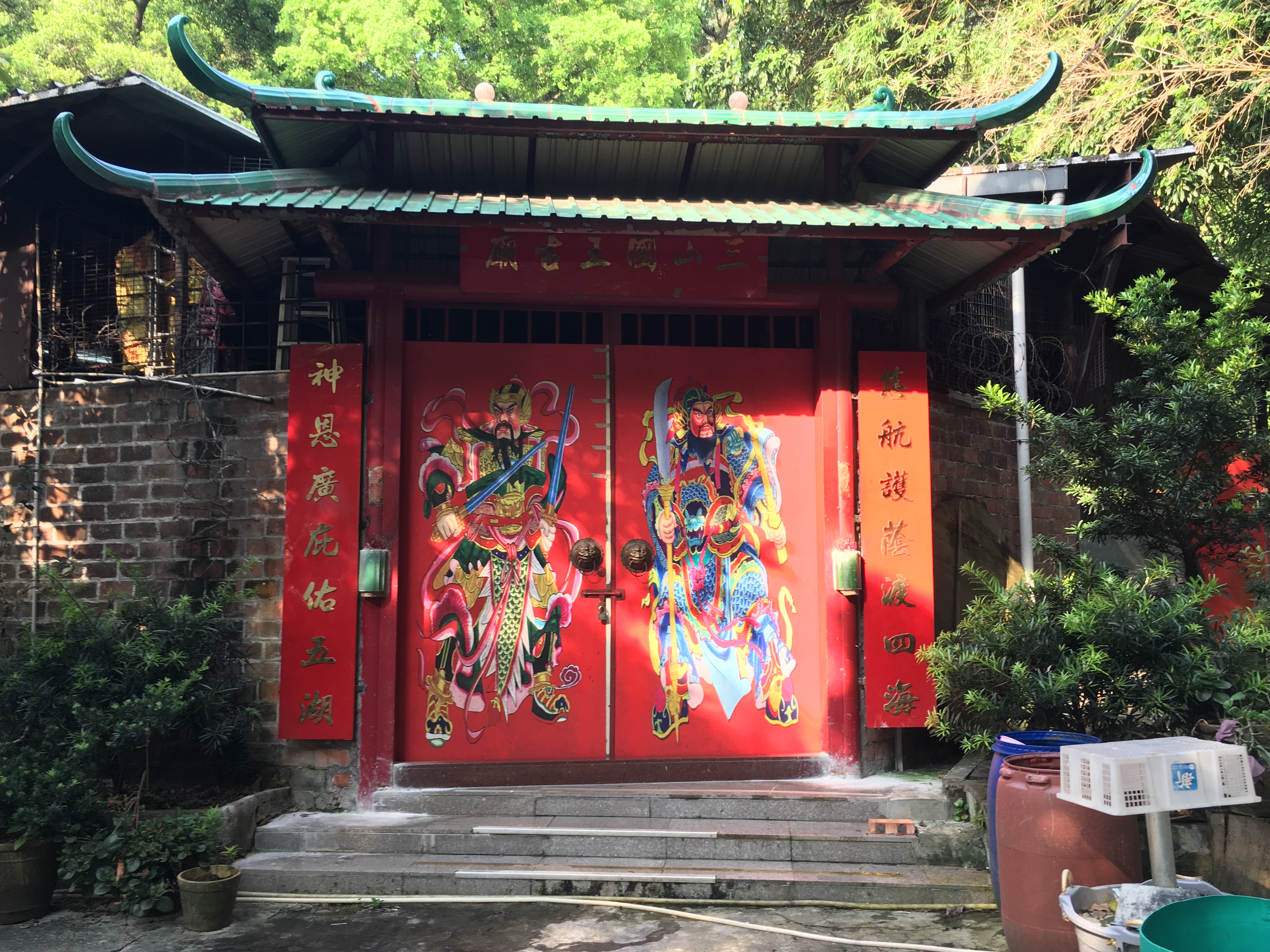
Sam Shan Kwok Wong Temple in Sai Tso Wan

Sai Tso Wan is an area near Kwun Tong in Kowloon, Hong Kong.

== History ==
At the end of the 18th century, Hakka settled into the Cha Kwo Ling area, and quarrying became their main occupation. By that time, the villages of Cha Kwo Ling, Ngau Tau Kok, Sai Tso Wan and Lei Yue Mun were collectively called Sze Shan (四山, "Four Hills").

== See also ==
- Four hills of Kowloon
- Sai Tso Wan Recreation Ground
- Laguna City
- Sceneway Garden
