= Public housing estates in Ngau Tau Kok and Kowloon Bay =

Public housing in Kowloon, Hong Kong

The following shows the public housing estates (including Home Ownership Scheme (HOS), Private Sector Participation Scheme (PSPS), Tenants Purchase Scheme (TPS)) in Ngau Tau Kok, Jordan Valley, Kowloon Bay and surrounding neighbourhoods, in Kwun Tong District, Kowloon, Hong Kong.

== Overview ==
Name		Type	Inaug.	No Blocks	No Units	Notes
Choi Ha Estate	彩霞邨	TPS	1989	3	790	
Choi Tak Estate	彩德邨	Public	2010	8	5,800	
Choi Fook Estate	彩福邨	Public	2010	5	4,556	
Choi Hing Court	彩興苑	HOS	2019	3	1,358	
Choi Ying Estate	彩盈邨	Public	2008	5	3,900	
Chun Wah Court	振華苑	HOS	1990	1	232	
Kai Tai Court	啟泰苑	HOS	1983	4	624	
Kai Yip Estate	啟業邨	Public	1981	6	4,300	
Lok Nga Court	樂雅苑	HOS	1984	6	1,331	
Lok Wah (North) Estate	樂華(北)邨	Public	1985	8	2,972	
Lok Wah (South) Estate	樂華(南)邨	Public	1982	6	6,998	
Lower Ngau Tau Kok (II) Estate	牛頭角下(二)邨	Public	1967	7	5,406	
On Kay Court	安基苑	HOS	1982	4	920	
Ping Shek Estate	坪石邨	Public	1970	7	4,575	
Richland Gardens	麗晶花園	PSPS	1985	22	5,904	
Upper Ngau Tau Kok Estate	牛頭角上邨	Public	2003	9	6,684	
Kwun Tong Garden Estate/Lotus Tower	觀塘花園大廈/玉蓮臺	Public	1965/1987	9	4,926	HK Housing Society

== Choi Ha Estate ==
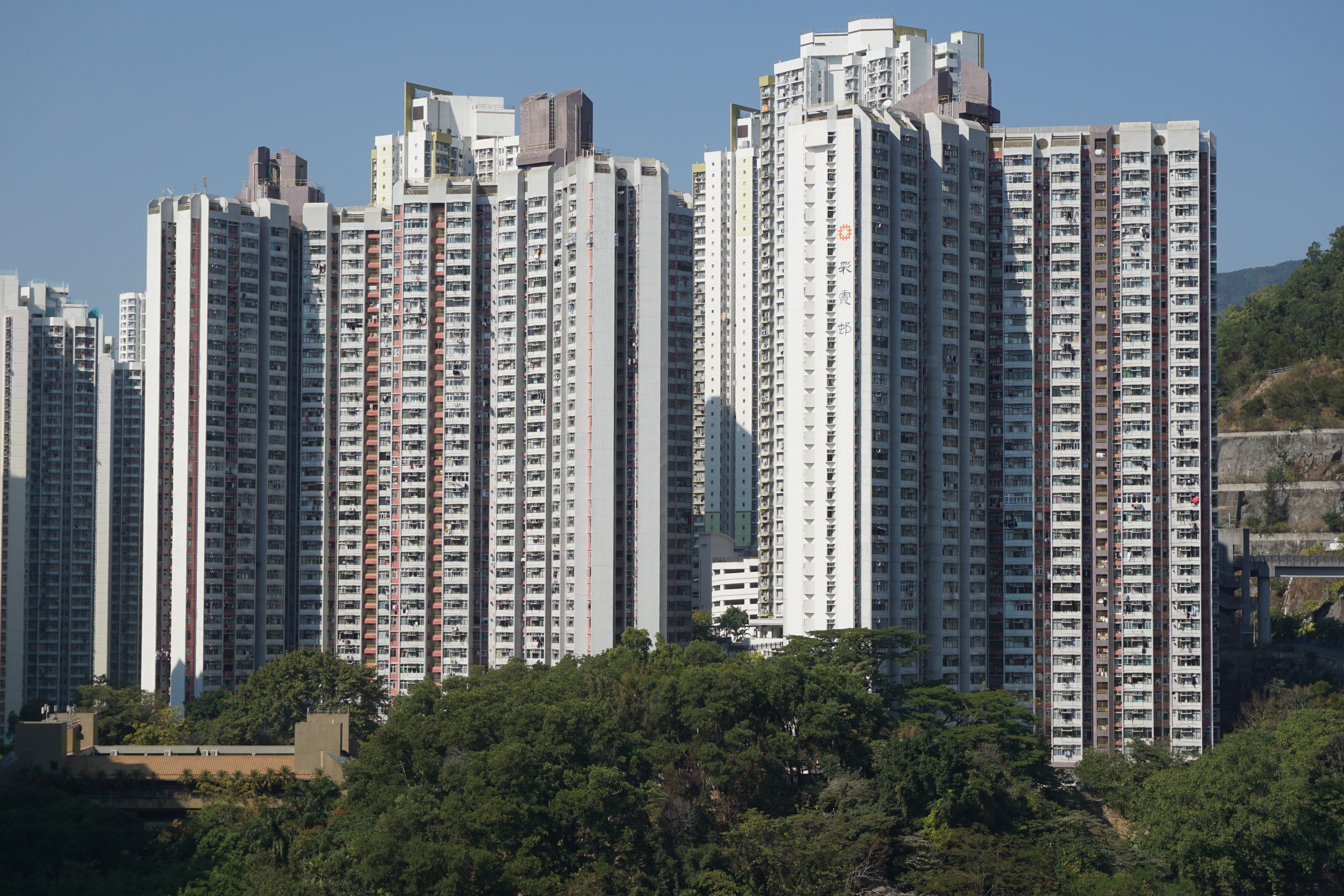
Choi Ha Estate

Choi Ha Estate (Chinese: 彩霞邨) is a public estate and TPS estate in the hillside of Jordan Valley near Amoy Gardens. It consists of 3 blocks built in 1989. Some of the flats were sold to tenants through Tenants Purchase Scheme Phase 3 in 2000. Its name comes from nearby Choi Ha Road.

=== Houses ===
Name	Type	Completion
Choi Sing House	Trident 3	1989
Choi Yat House	Trident 4	1989
Choi Yuet House	Trident 4	1989

Choi Ha Estate is in Primary One Admission (POA) School Net 46. Within the school net are multiple aided schools (operated independently but funded with government money); no government primary schools are in this net.

== Choi Fook Estate ==
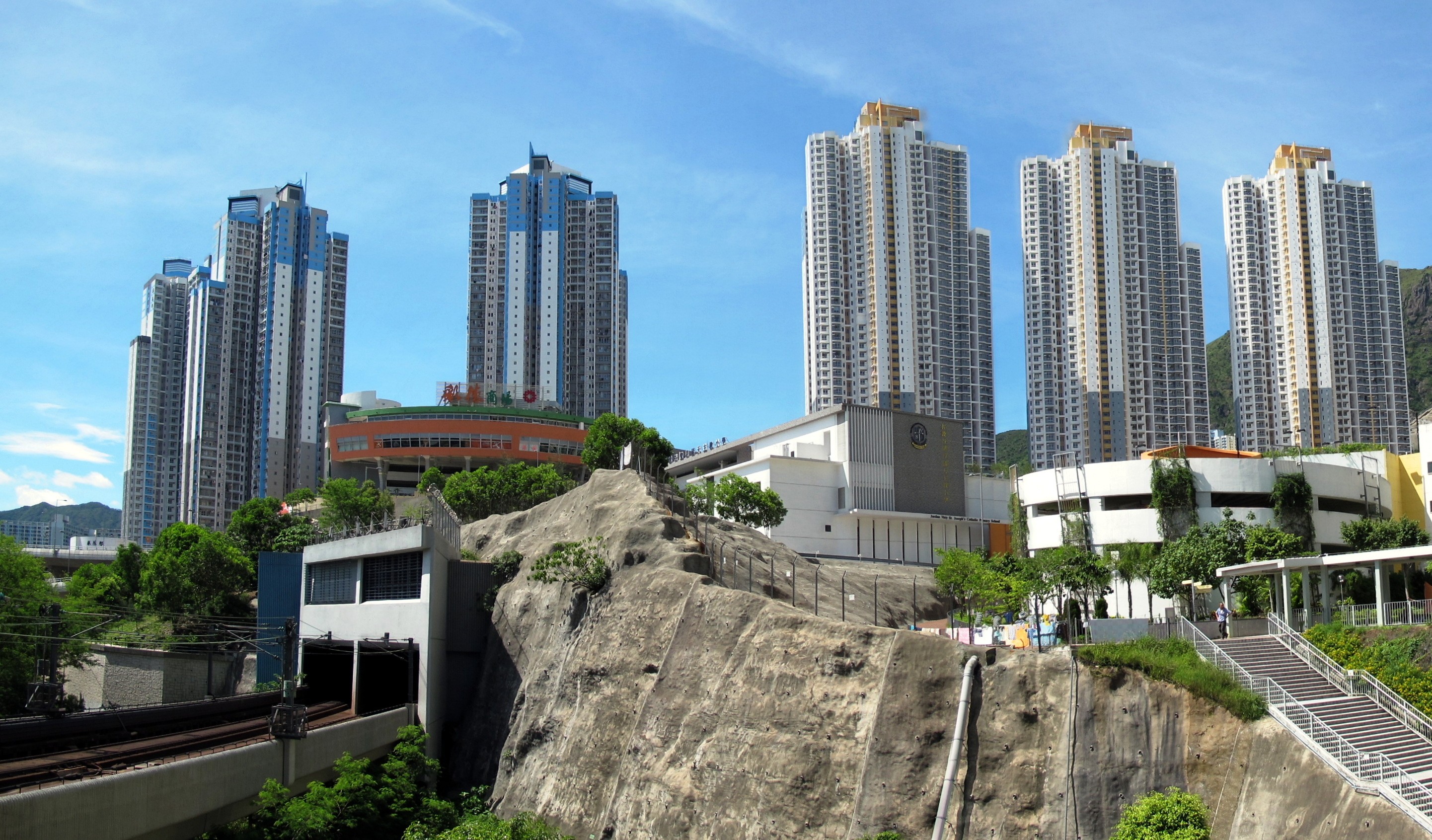
Choi Fook Estate

Choi Fook Estate (Chinese: 彩福邨), formerly Choi Wan Road Site 3B (Chinese: 彩雲路3B區), is a public estate in Ping Shan next to Choi Ying Estate. Formerly a quarry site, Choi Fook Estate is a part of the housing development near Choi Wan Road and Jordan Valley. It is developed into 2 phases. All blocks in Phrase 1 & 2 occupied in 2010. other 1 further block in Phase 3 will be occupied in 2020.

== Choi Hing Court ==
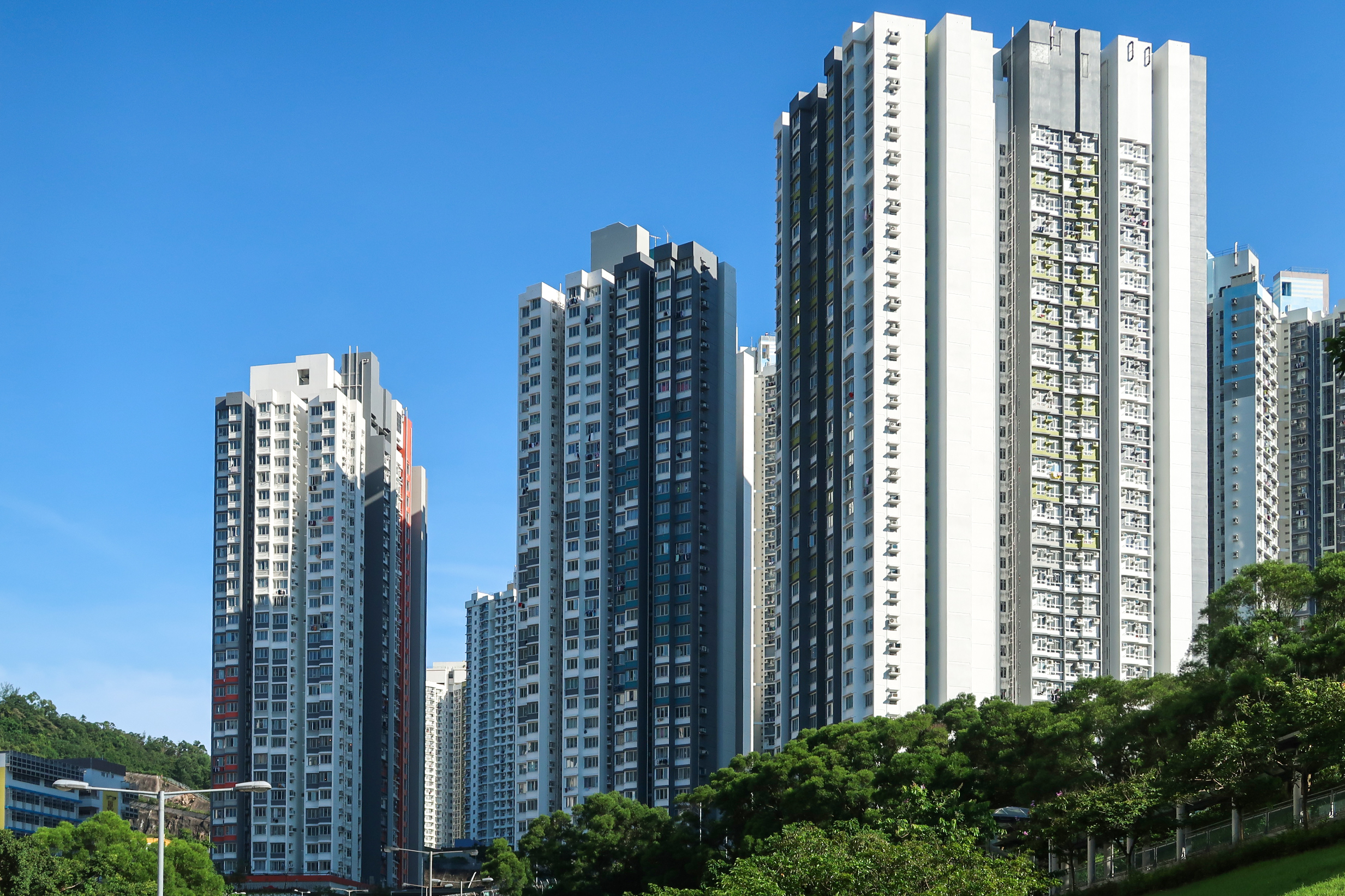
Choi Hing Court

Choi Hing Court (Chinese: 彩興苑) is a home ownership scheme court located at a hillside near New Clear Water Bay Road and Ping Shek Playground in Choi Hing Road, Ping Shan of Kwun Tong District, opposite to Choi Wan Estate in Wong Tai Sin District. Its location is usually described as Choi Hung, Ngau Tau Kok or Kowloon Bay. It comprises 3 blocks with 1,341 flats in total and completed in 2019.

=== Houses ===
Name	Type	Completion
Choi Huen House (彩萱閣) (Block A)	Non standard	2019
Choi Wui House (彩薈閣) (Block B)	Non standard	2019
Choi Kiu House (彩蕎閣) (Block C)	Non standard	2019

== Choi Tak Estate ==
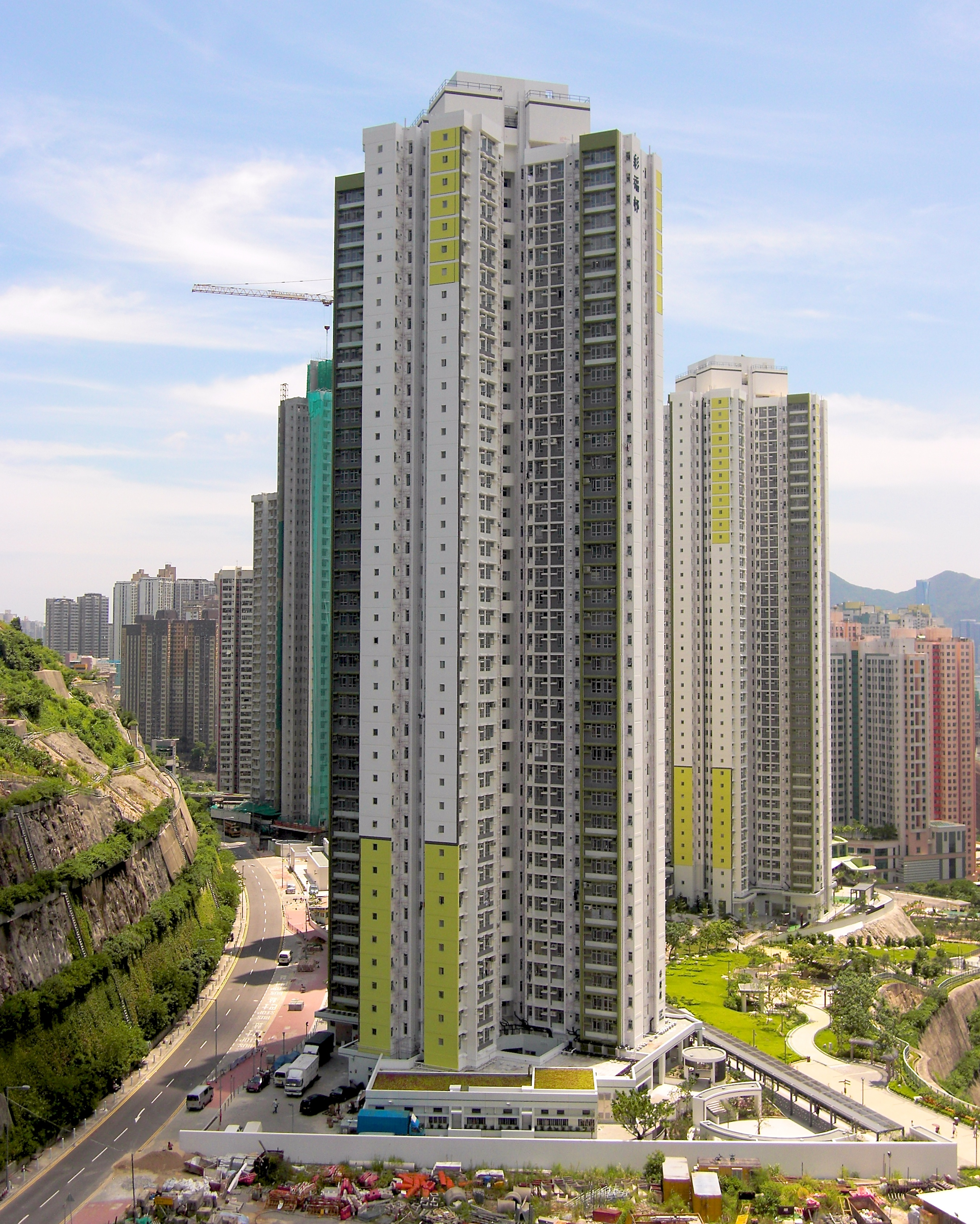
Choi Tak Estate

Choi Tak Estate (Chinese: 彩德邨), formerly Choi Wan Road Site 2 (Chinese: 彩雲道2區) and Choi Wan Road Site 3A (Chinese: 彩雲道3A區), is a public estate in Ping Shan next to Choi Ying Estate. Choi Tak Estate is a part of the housing development near Jordan Valley. It is developed into 3 phases. All blocks occupied in 2010.

== Choi Ying Estate ==
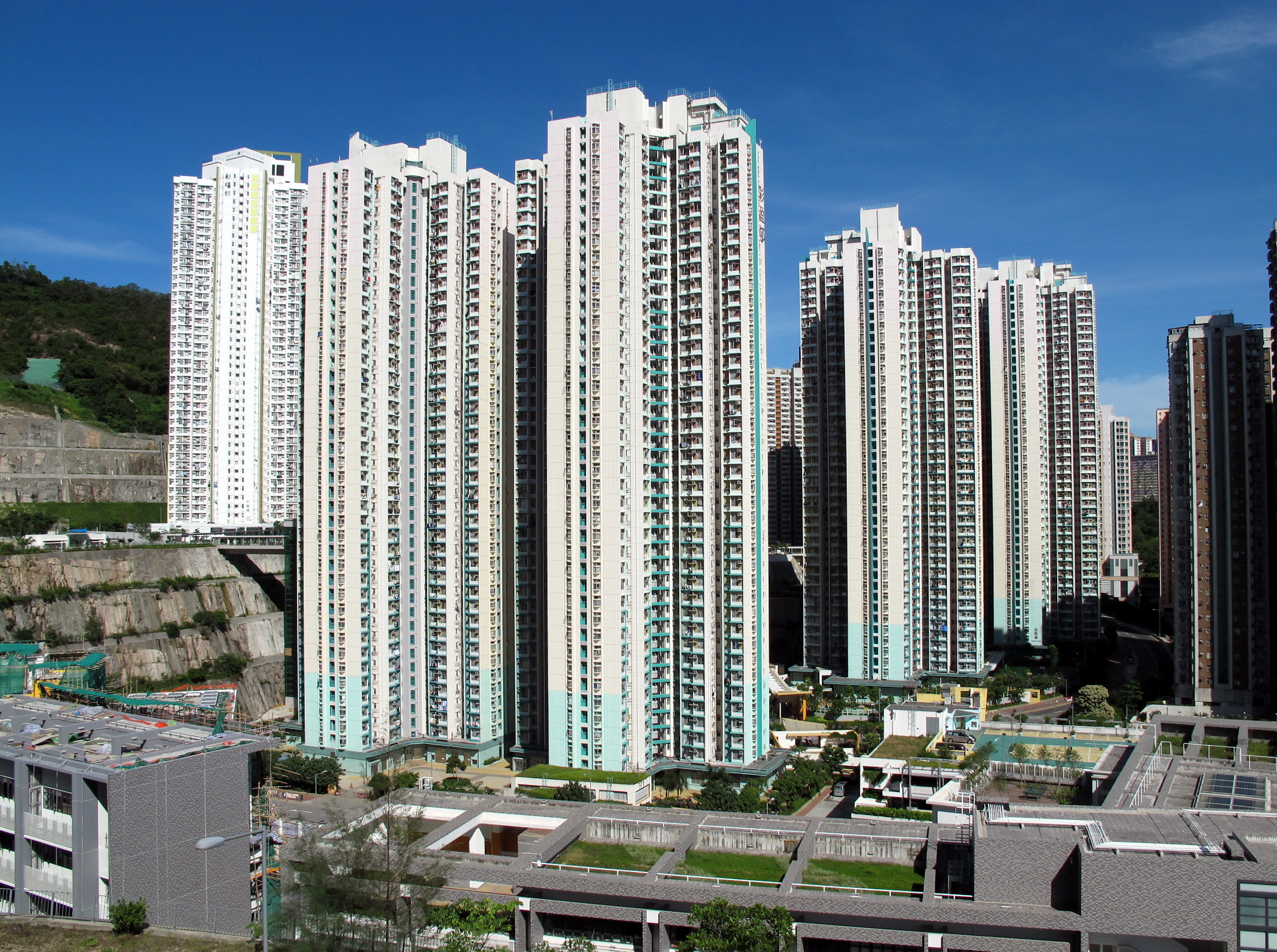
Choi Ying Estate

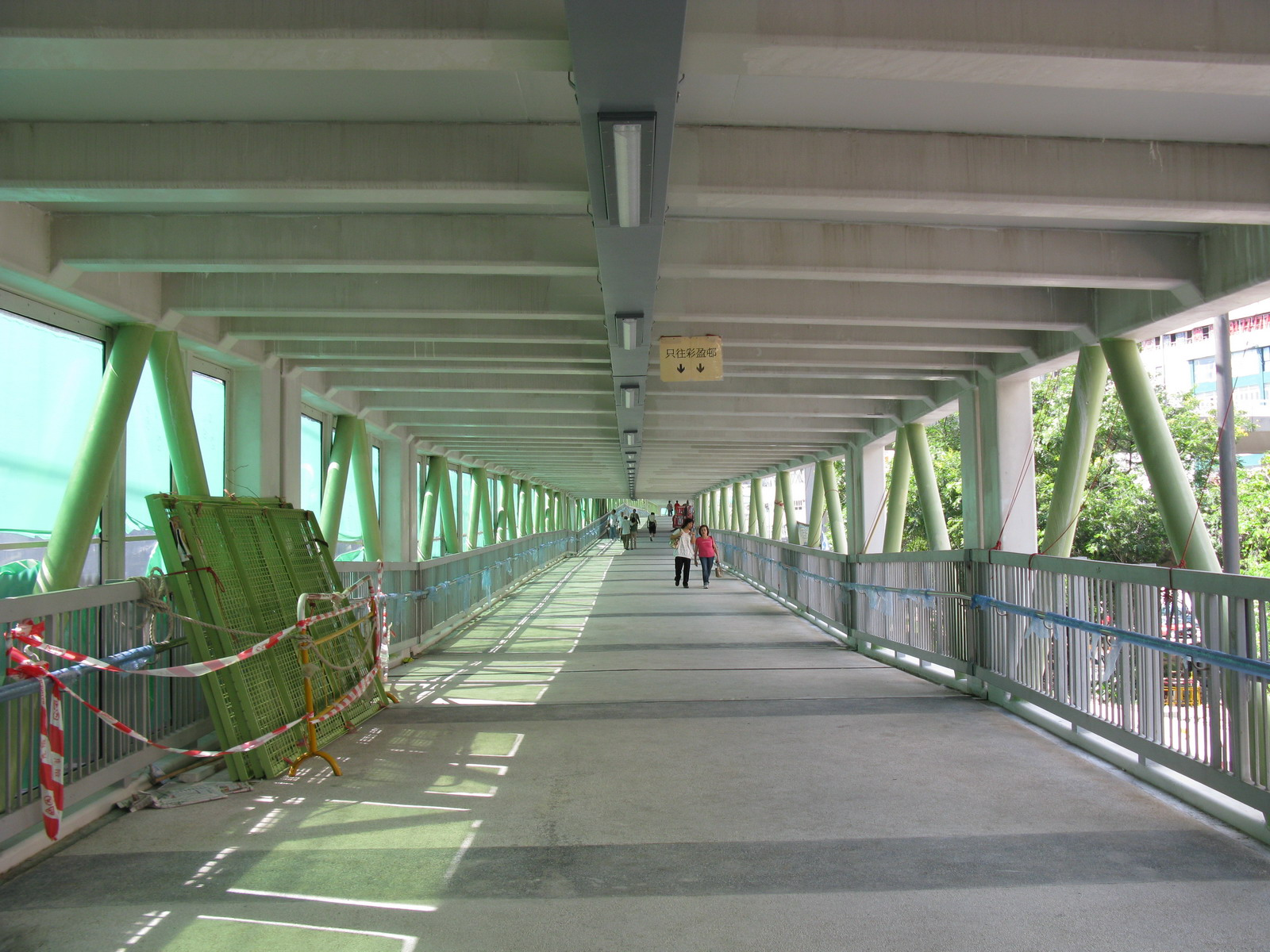
A pedestrian footbridge linking between Choi Ying Estate and MTR Kowloon Bay station

Choi Ying Estate (Chinese: 彩盈邨), formerly Choi Wan Road Site 1 (Chinese: 彩雲道1區), is a public estate in Ping Shan next to Choi Ha Estate. Formerly the Ping Shan Quarry site, Choi Ying Estate is a part of the housing development near Choi Wan Road and Jordan Valley. The estate has 5 blocks and a shopping centre, Choi Ying Place (Chinese: 彩盈坊), completed in 2008. There is also a footbridge linking Choi Ying Estate with MTR Kowloon Bay station.

=== Houses ===
Name	Type	Completion
Ying Fu House	New Harmony 1	2008
Ying On House	New Harmony 1	2008
Ying Hong House	New Harmony 1	2008
Ying Lok House	New Harmony 1	2008
Ying Shun House	New Harmony 1	2008

Choi Ying Estate is in Primary One Admission (POA) School Net 46. Within the school net are multiple aided schools (operated independently but funded with government money); no government primary schools are in this net.

== Chun Wah Court ==
Chun Wah Court (Chinese: 振華苑) is a HOS court in Ngau Tau Kok, near On Kay Court. Formerly a site of an administration building of the Hong Kong Housing Authority, the court consists of 1 block built in 1990.

=== House ===
Name	Type	Completion
Chun Wah Court	Flexi 3	1990

== Kai Tai Court ==
Kai Tai Court (Chinese: 啟泰苑) is a HOS court in Kowloon Bay, next to Kai Yip Estate. It has totally 4 blocks built in 1983.

=== Houses ===
Name	Type	Completion
Kai Pong House	Old-Cruciform	1983
Kai On House	Old-Cruciform	1983
Kai Hong House	Old-Cruciform	1983
Kai Fan House	Old-Cruciform	1983

== Kai Yip Estate ==
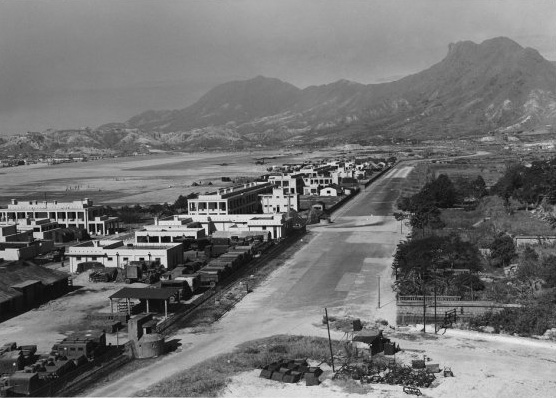
The road in the middle is Kwun Tong Road. On the left hand side is the base of the RAF Kai Tak at that time, where Kai Yip Estate is located now.

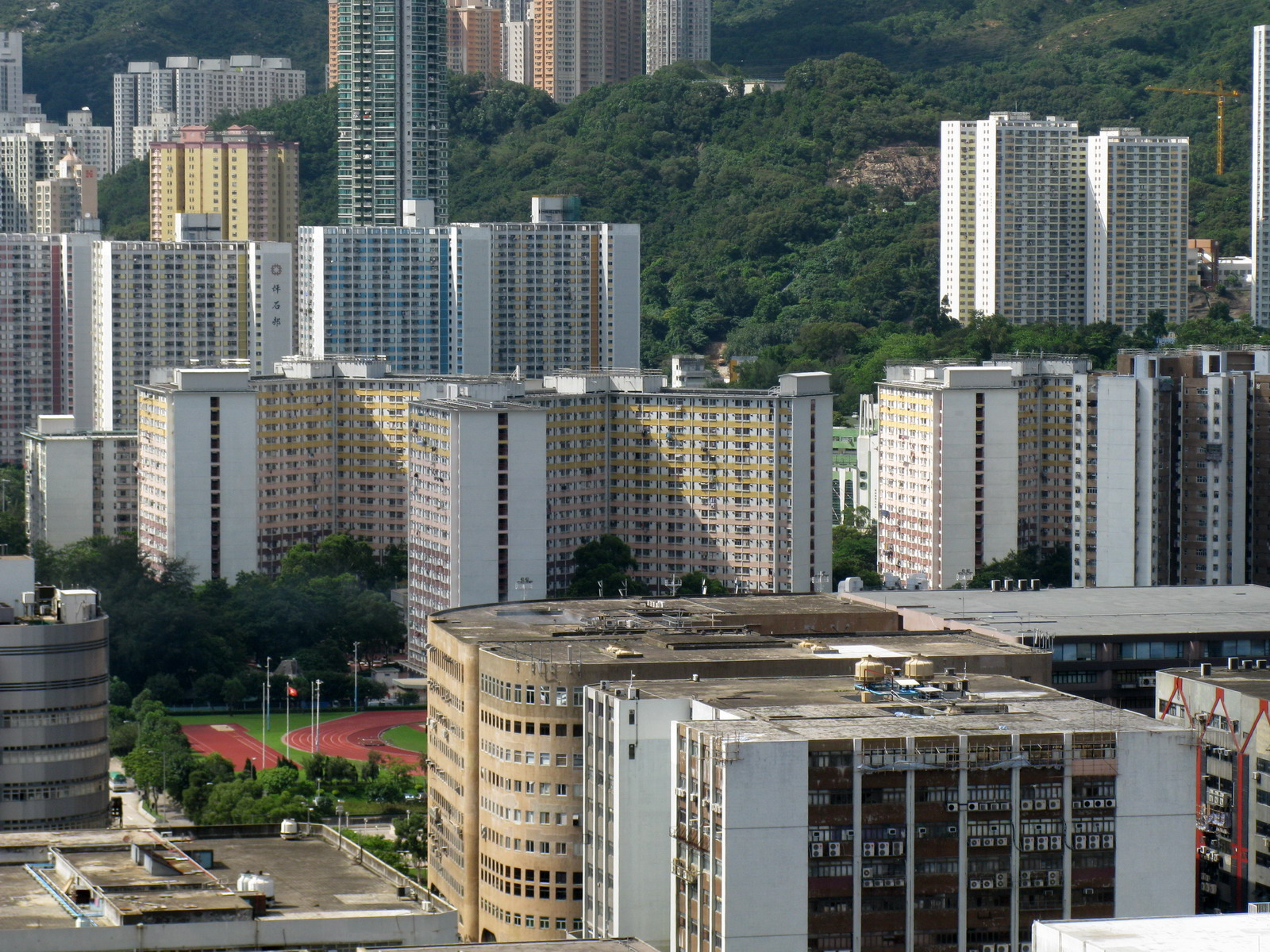
Kai Yip Estate

Kai Yip Estate (Chinese: 啟業邨) is a public estate in Kowloon Bay, next to Richland Gardens.

=== Background ===
The site of Kai Yip Estate was the site of RAF Kai Tak, in which the land was obtained from land reclamation of Kowloon Bay. In 1927, the base started operations at the south of Nga Tsin Wai Tsuen, and the current sites of Richland Gardens and Kwun Tong Bypass. In 1981, the base was relocated and Kai Yip Estate was built at part of the site. For the estate name, "Kai" means Kai Tak and "Yip" means "prospect" in Chinese.

=== Houses ===
Name	Type	Completion
Kai Cheung House	Triple I	1981
Kai Ning House	Triple I	1981
Kai Shing House	Triple I	1981
Kai Yin House	Old Slab	1981
Kai Lok House	Old Slab	1981
Kai Yue House	Old Slab	1981

Kai Yip Estate is in Primary One Admission (POA) School Net 46. Within the school net are multiple aided schools (operated independently but funded with government money); no government primary schools are in this net.

== Lok Wah Estate / Lok Nga Court ==
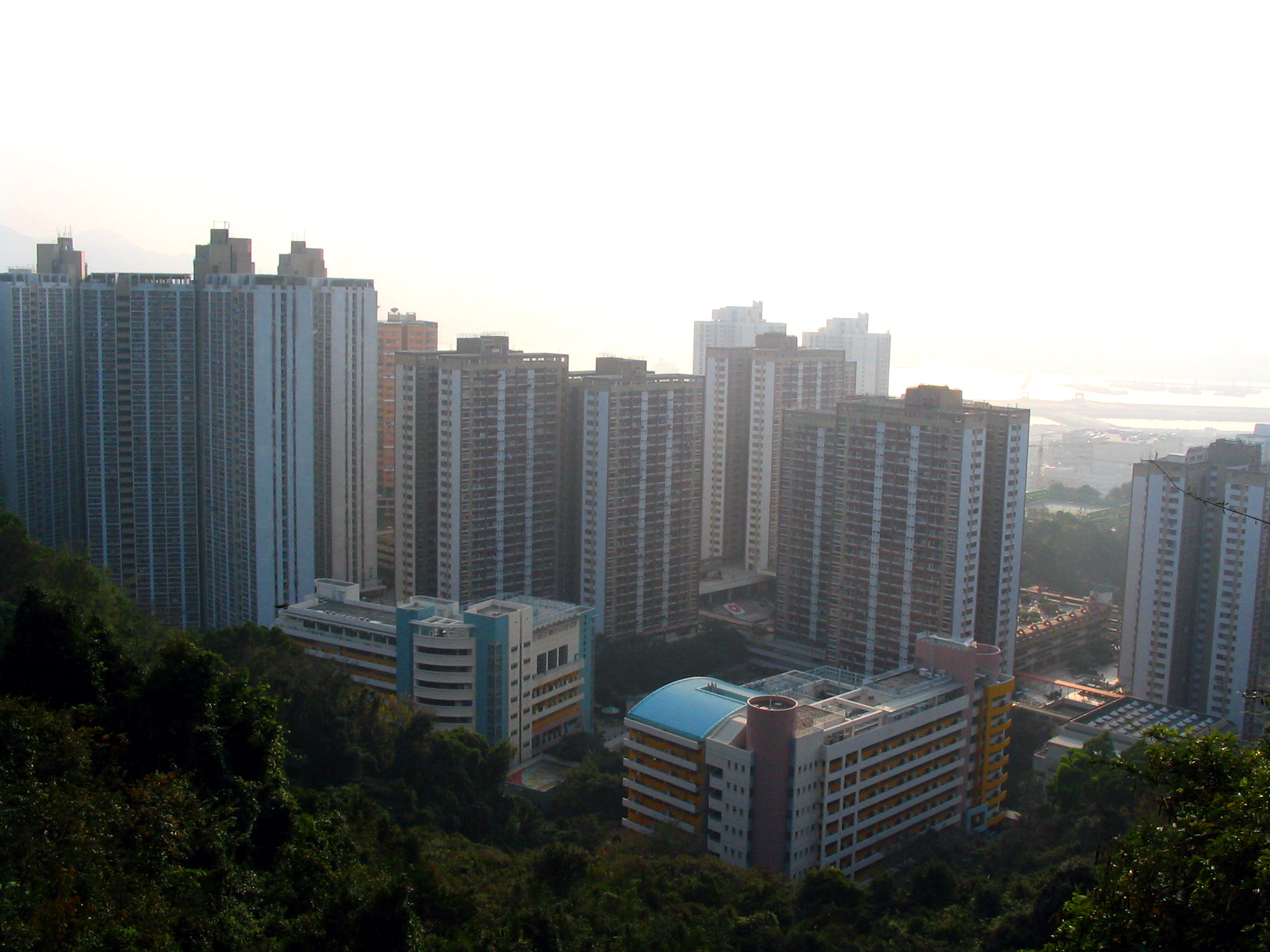
Lok Wah Estate

Lok Wah Estate (Chinese: 樂華邨; pinyin: Lèhuácūn; Jyutping: lok6 waa4 cyun1) is a public housing estate located in Dragon Hill, located on Chun Wah Road, northwest of Kwun Tong Town Central. It is divided into Lok Wah South Estate (樂華南邨) and Lok Wah North Estate (樂華北邨), together with 14 blocks of residential buildings.

== Lower Ngau Tau Kok Estate ==
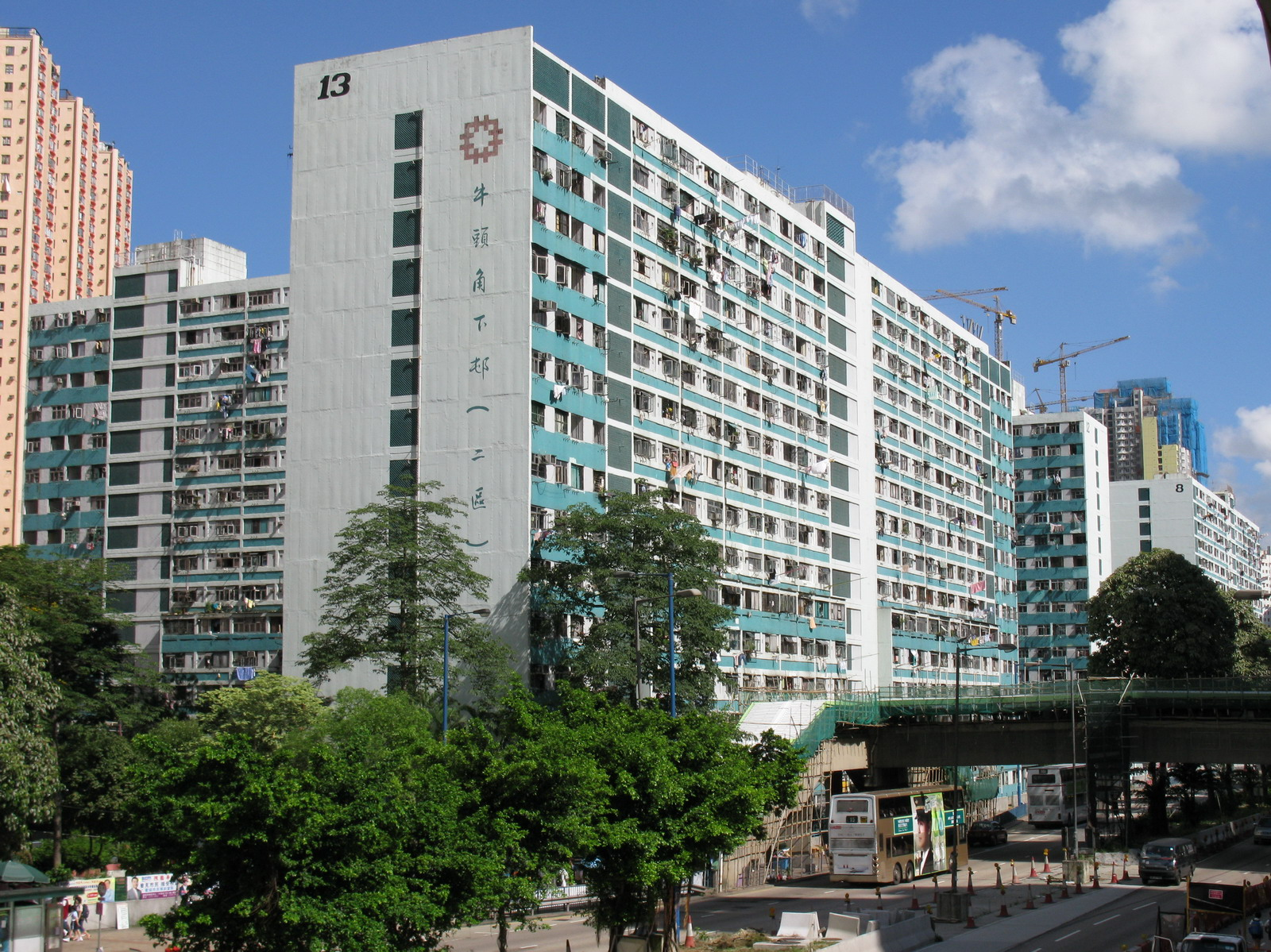
Lower Ngau Tau Kok (II) Estate in 2008

Lower Ngau Tau Kok (II) Estate (Chinese: 牛頭角下邨（二區） or 牛頭角下（二）邨) is a 7-block public estate in Ngau Tau Kok, located opposite to the MTR Kowloon Bay station. It was demolished from 2009 to 2012. The estate, along with the now demolished Lower Ngau Tau Kok (I) Estate, forms the Lower Ngau Tau Kok Estate.

== On Kay Court ==
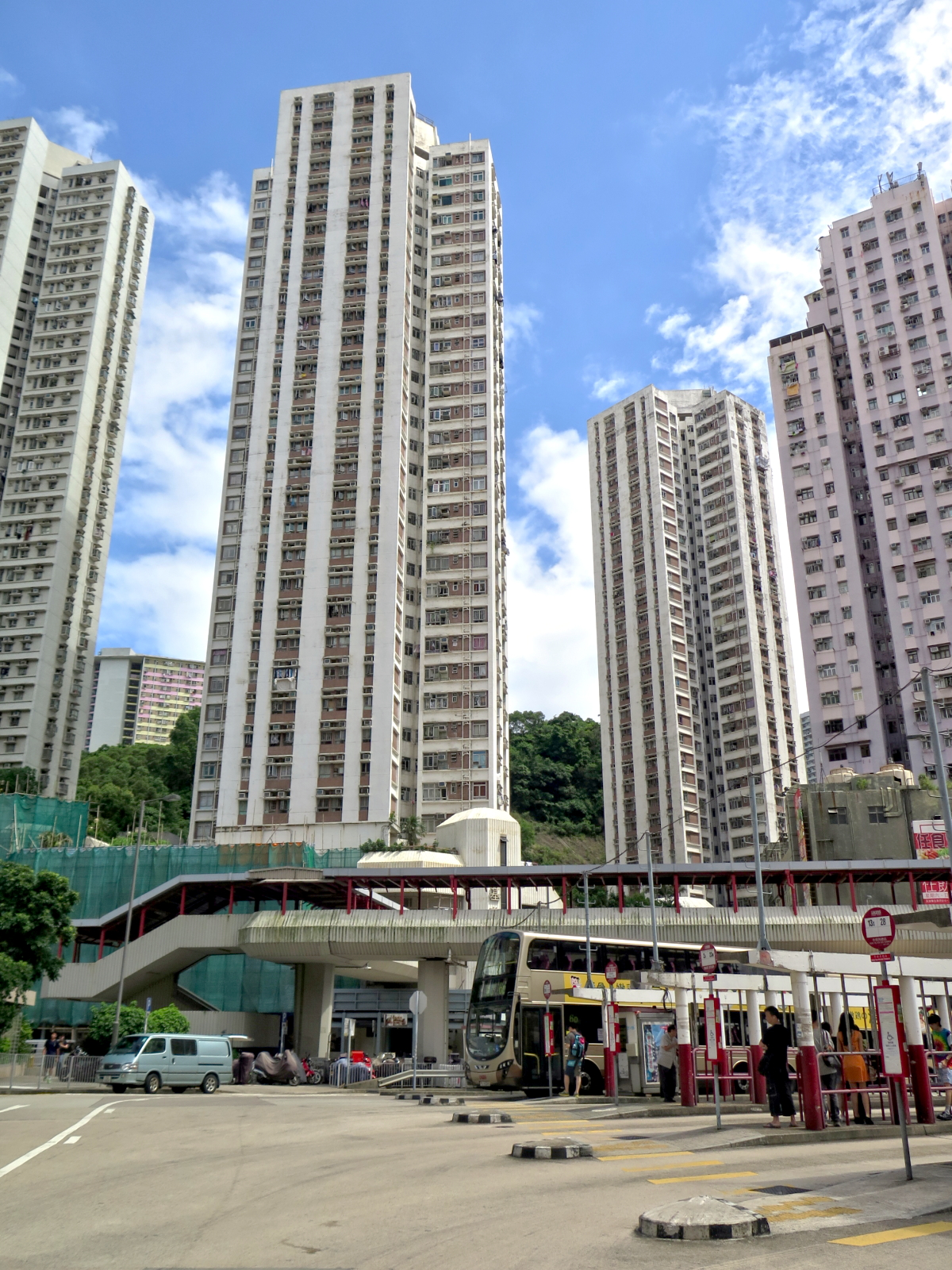
On Kay Court

On Kay Court (Chinese: 安基苑) is a HOS court in Ngau Tau Kok, near Chun Wah Court. It was developed into 2 phases in 1982 and 1984 respectively, and it consists of 4 blocks of 29–30 storeys.

=== Houses ===
Name	Type	Completion
Kay Yan House	Flexi 1	1982
Kay Shun House	Flexi 1	1982
Kay Hong House	Flexi 1	1984
Kay Yue House	Flexi 1	1984

== Ping Shek Estate ==
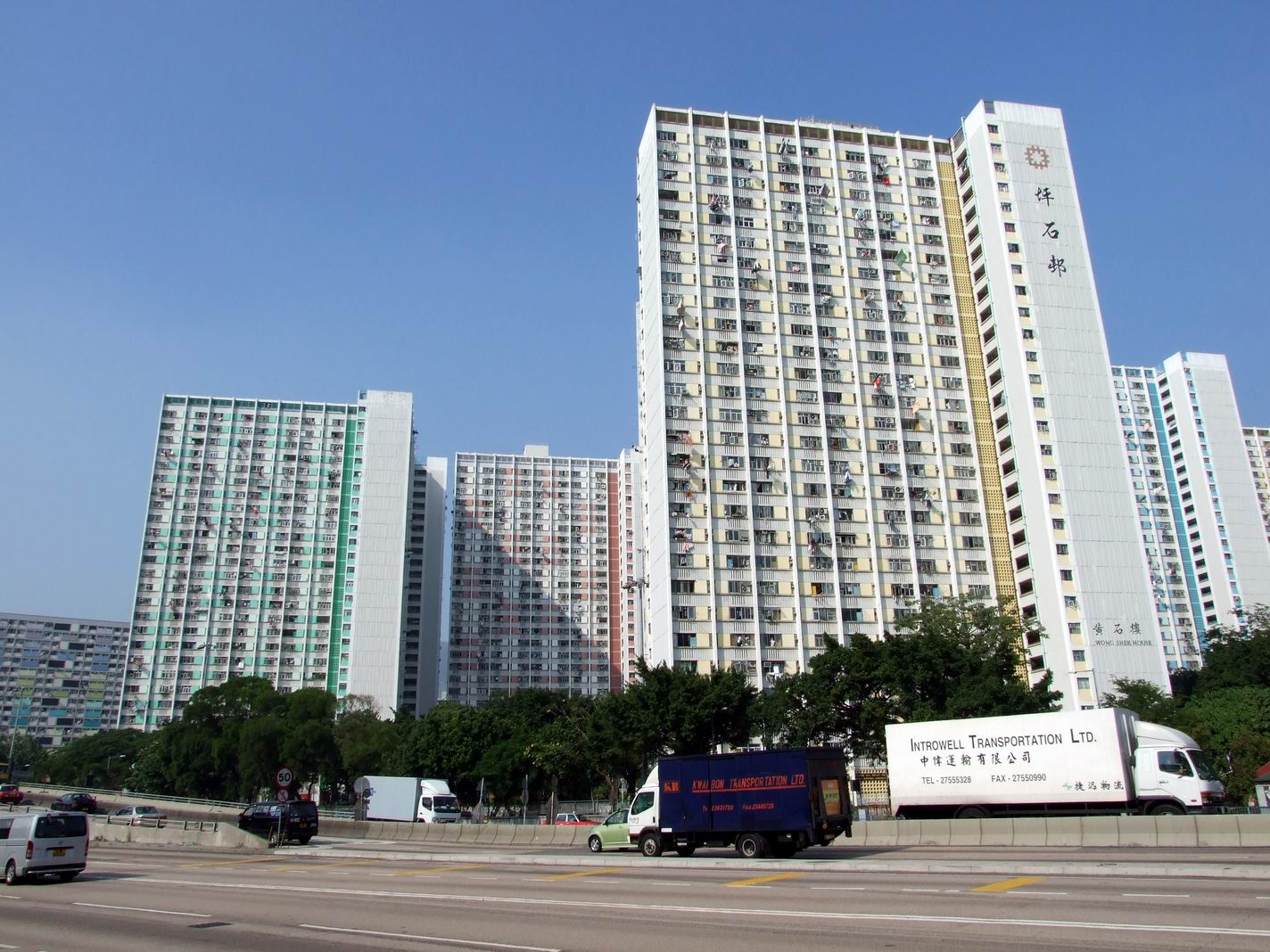
Ping Shek Estate

Ping Shek Estate (Chinese: 坪石邨) is a public estate in Jordan Valley, Ngau Tau Kok. It is situated between the Kowloon entrance of Clear Water Bay Road to Sai Kung and the entrance of Kwun Tong Road to Kwun Tong. Although it is near Choi Hung Estate, it is just out of the boundary of Wong Tai Sin District and belongs to Kwun Tong District.

== Richland Gardens ==
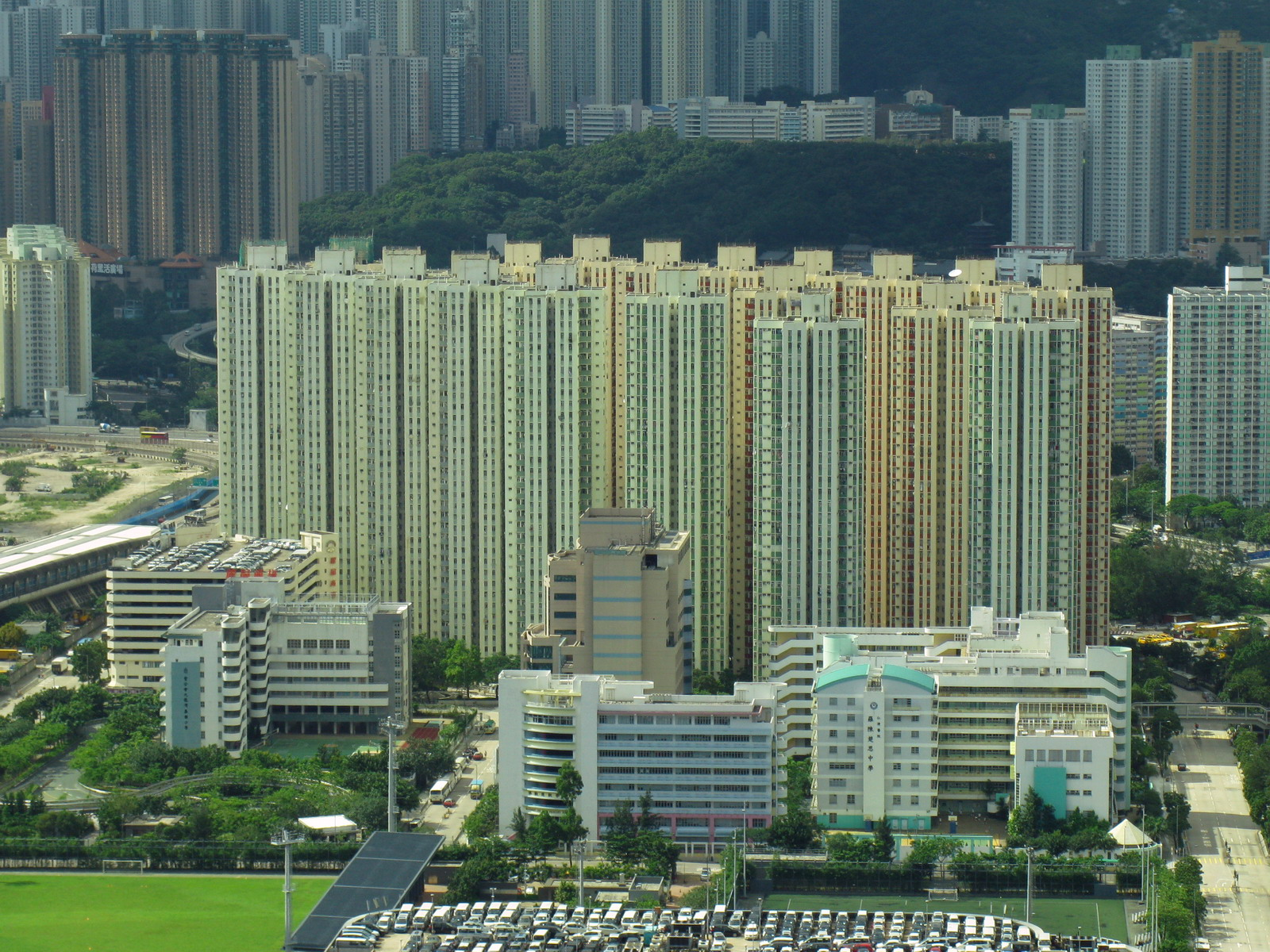
Richland Gardens

Richland Gardens (Chinese: 麗晶花園) is a HOS and Private Sector Participation Scheme in Kowloon Bay, Kowloon, Hong Kong, near Kai Yip Estate. It was jointly developed by Hong Kong Housing Authority and Shui On. It consists of 22 residential blocks and a shopping centre completed in 1985.

== Upper Ngau Tau Kok Estate ==
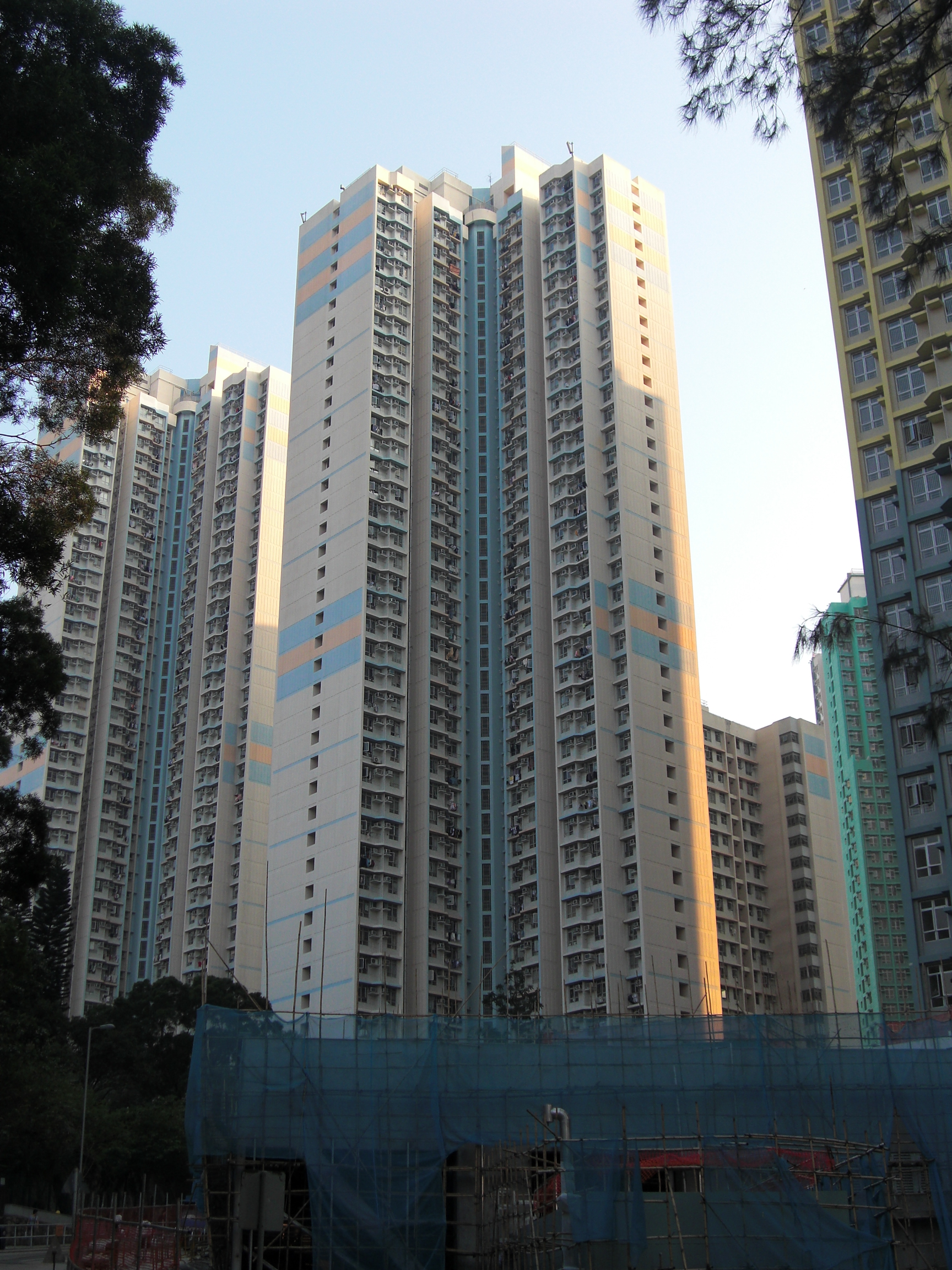
Upper Ngau Tau Kok Estate Phase 1

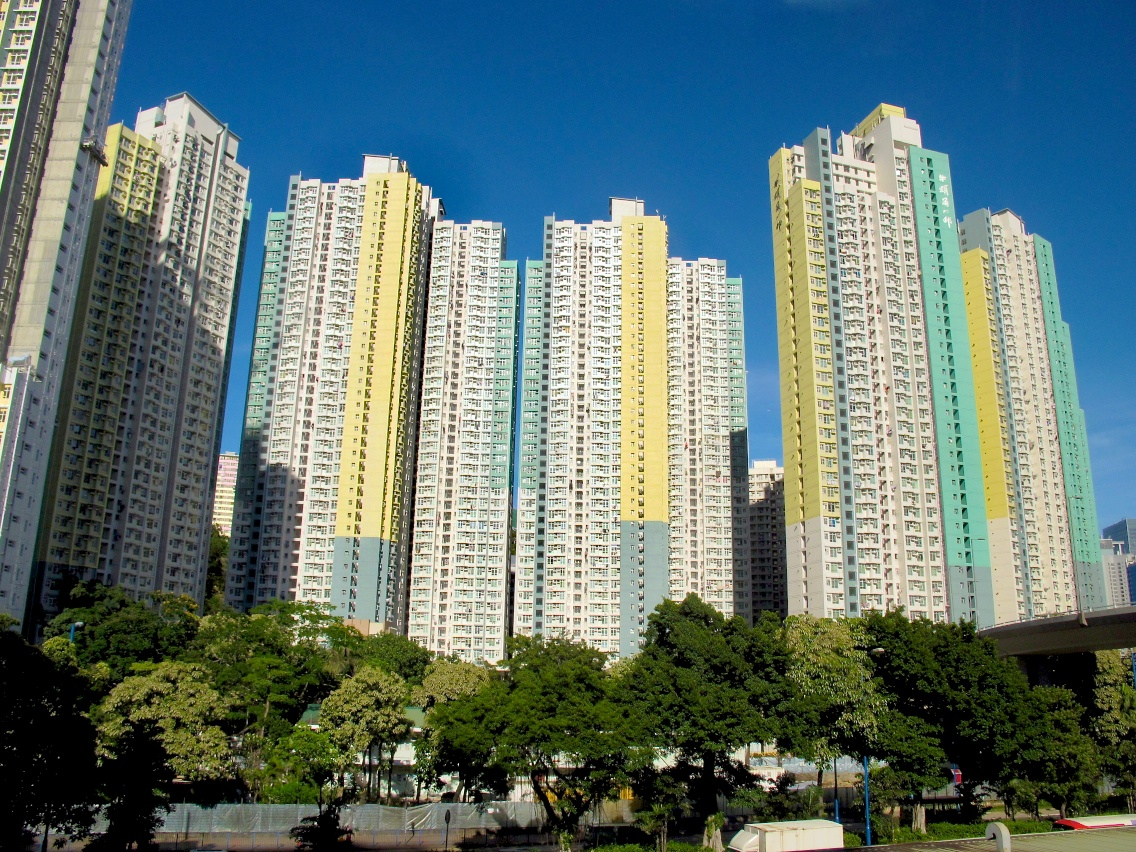
Upper Ngau Tau Kok Estate Phase 2 and 3

Upper Ngau Tau Kok Estate (Chinese: 牛頭角上邨) is a public estate in Ngau Tau Kok, next to Kwun Tong Garden Estate and between MTR Ngau Tau Kok station and Kowloon Bay station. After redevelopment, the estate has 9 blocks developed into 3 phases.

== Kwun Tong Garden Estate and Lotus Tower ==
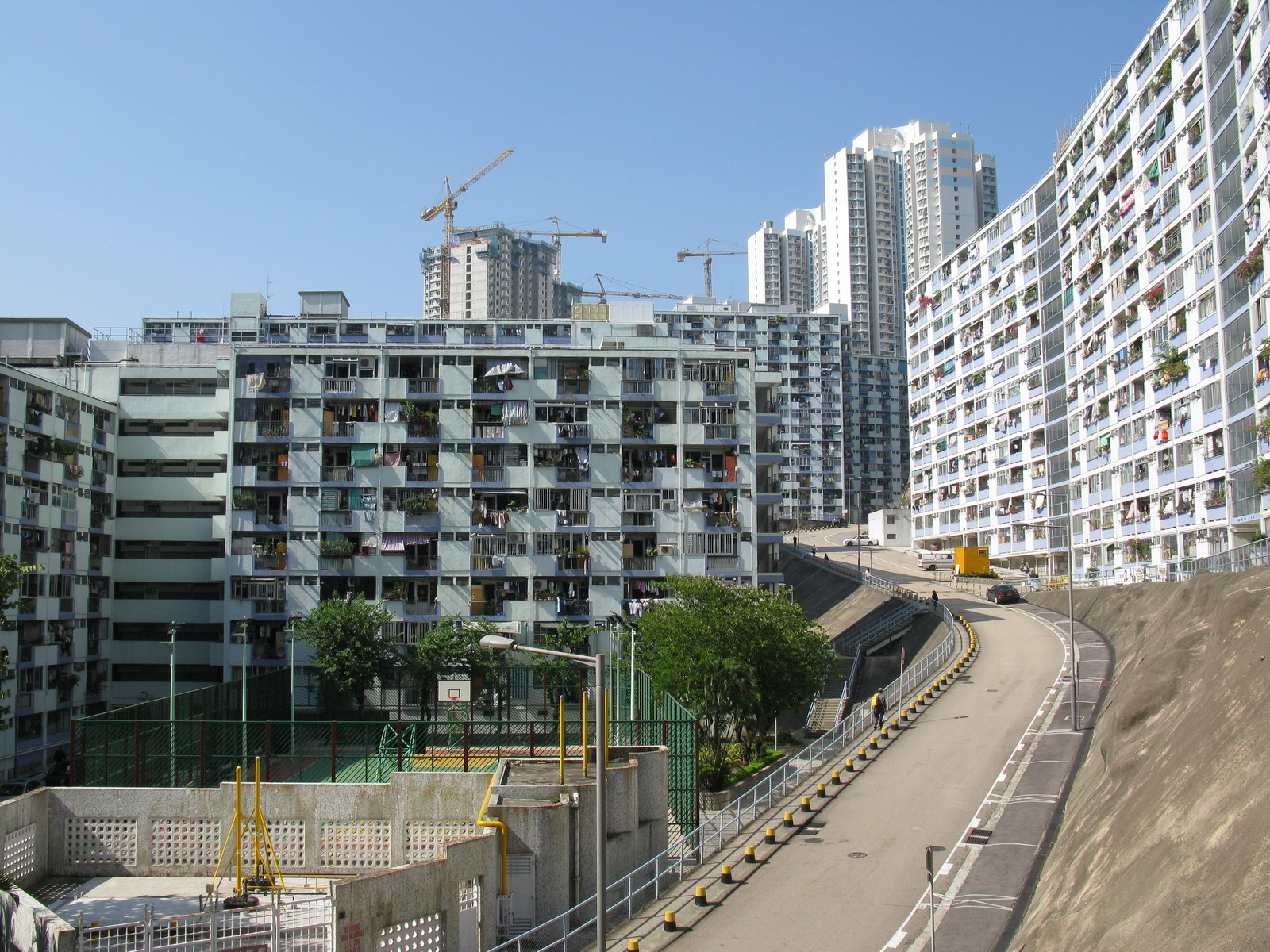
Hung Cheuk Lau and Wah Mei Lau, Kwun Tong Garden Estate

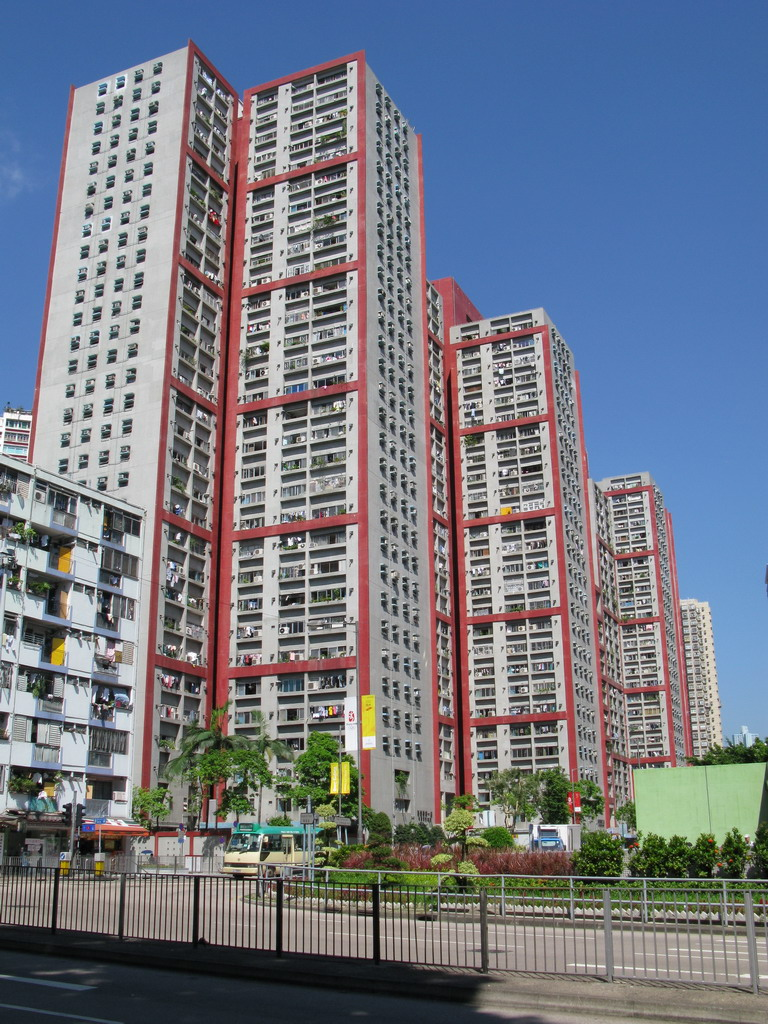
Lotus Tower

Kwun Tong Garden Estate (Chinese: 觀塘花園大廈), or Garden Estate (Chinese: 花園大廈), is a public estate in Ngau Tau Kok Road, Ngau Tau Kok, developed by the Hong Kong Housing Society, near MTR Ngau Tau Kok station. It is the first public housing estate in Kwun Tong District. It comprises 5 blocks built in 1965 and 1967 respectively.

Lotus Tower (Chinese: 玉蓮臺) is a public housing estate near Kwun Tong Garden Estate, which was redeveloped from old Kwun Tong Garden Estate blocks.
