= Ping Shan, Kowloon =

Hill in Hong Kong

Ping Shan
- 平山, 機場山, 坪石
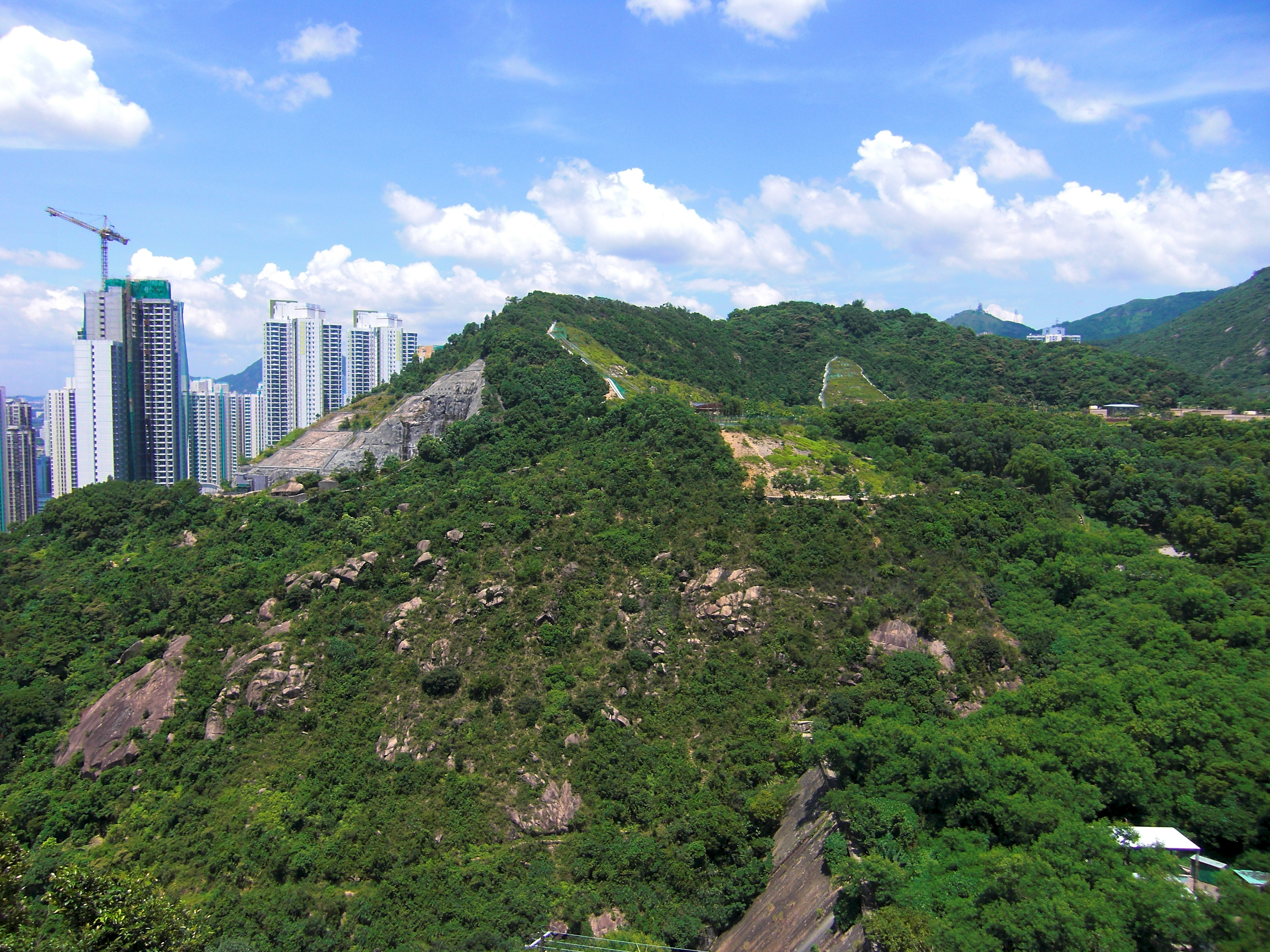
- View of Ping Shan

Highest point
- Elevation: 188.98 m (620.0 ft)
- Coordinates: 22°19′50.86″N 114°13′7.71″E

Geography
- Location within Hong Kong
- Location: Hong Kong

Ping Shan (Chinese: 平山) is a hill in Kwun Tong District, eastern Kowloon that lies between the communities of Ngau Chi Wan, Kowloon Bay and Jordan Valley, Hong Kong. Most of it was the Ping Shan Stone Quarry before redevelopedment into a new neighbourhood with numerous public housing estates and schools. Being unlabelled in most maps, it was often mistaken as part of the forementioned neighbourhoods and Ngau Tau Kok.

== History ==
Initial human settlement was found in a northwestern section where Ping Shek Estate is now situated with villages named "Ping Shek" (坪石) and "Pak Uk Tsai" (白屋仔). Except this northwestern section, most of Ping Shan was excavated as the Ping Shan Stone Quarry until 1975 when an MTR tunnel between Choi Hung station and Kowloon Bay station was built.

As part of "Development near Choi Wan Road and Jordan Valley" project, Ping Shan was developed into a new neighbourhood with Choi Ying Estate, Choi Tak Estate, Choi Fook Estate and Choi Hing Court. The mining history of the neighbourhood became the theme of Choi Wing Road Park and Choi Hei Road Park.

== See also ==
- List of mountains, peaks and hills in Hong Kong
- Four hills of Kowloon
