= Choi Tak (constituency) =

Constituency in Kwun Tong District, Hong Kong

- Elected constituency for the Kwun Tong District Council
- Boundary of Choi Tak in Kwun Tong District
- District: Kwun Tong
- Legislative Council constituency: Kowloon East
- Population: 17,540 (2019)
- Electorate: 7,181 (2019)

Current constituency
- Created: 2011
- Number of members: One
- Member: Tam Siu-cheuk (DAB)
- Created from: Ping Shek

Choi Tak (Chinese: 彩德), previously Sheung Choi, is one of the 37 constituencies in the Kwun Tong District of Hong Kong which was created in 2011.

The constituency loosely covers part of Choi Tak Estate with the estimated population of 17,540.

== Councillors represented ==
Election	Member	Party
2011	Tam Siu-cheuk	DAB

== Election results ==
=== 2010s ===
Kwun Tong District Council Election, 2019: Choi Tak
Party	Candidate	Votes	%	±%
DAB	Tam Siu-cheuk	2,882	57.21	
Democratic	Lam Tsz-keun	2,156	42.79	
Majority		726	14.42	
Turnout		5,055	70.45	
DAB hold		Swing		

Kwun Tong District Council Election, 2015: Sheung Choi
Party	Candidate	Votes	%	±%
DAB	Tam Siu-cheuk	Uncontested		
DAB hold		Swing		

Kwun Tong District Council Election, 2011: Sheung Choi
Party	Candidate	Votes	%	±%
DAB	Tam Siu-cheuk	1,814	72.6	
Democratic	Ying Wing-ho	426	17.0	
LSD	Wong Ka-lok	259	10.4	
Majority		1,388	55.6	
DAB win (new seat)				
