= Cha Kwo Ling =

Hill in Hong Kong

Coordinates: 22.3037°N 114.231°E

- Traditional Chinese: 茶果嶺
- Simplified Chinese: 茶果岭
- Cantonese Yale: chàh gwó léhng
Transcriptions
Standard Mandarin
- Hanyu Pinyin: Chá Guǒ Lǐng
Yue: Cantonese
- Yale Romanization: chàh gwó léhng
- Jyutping: caa4 gwo2 leng5

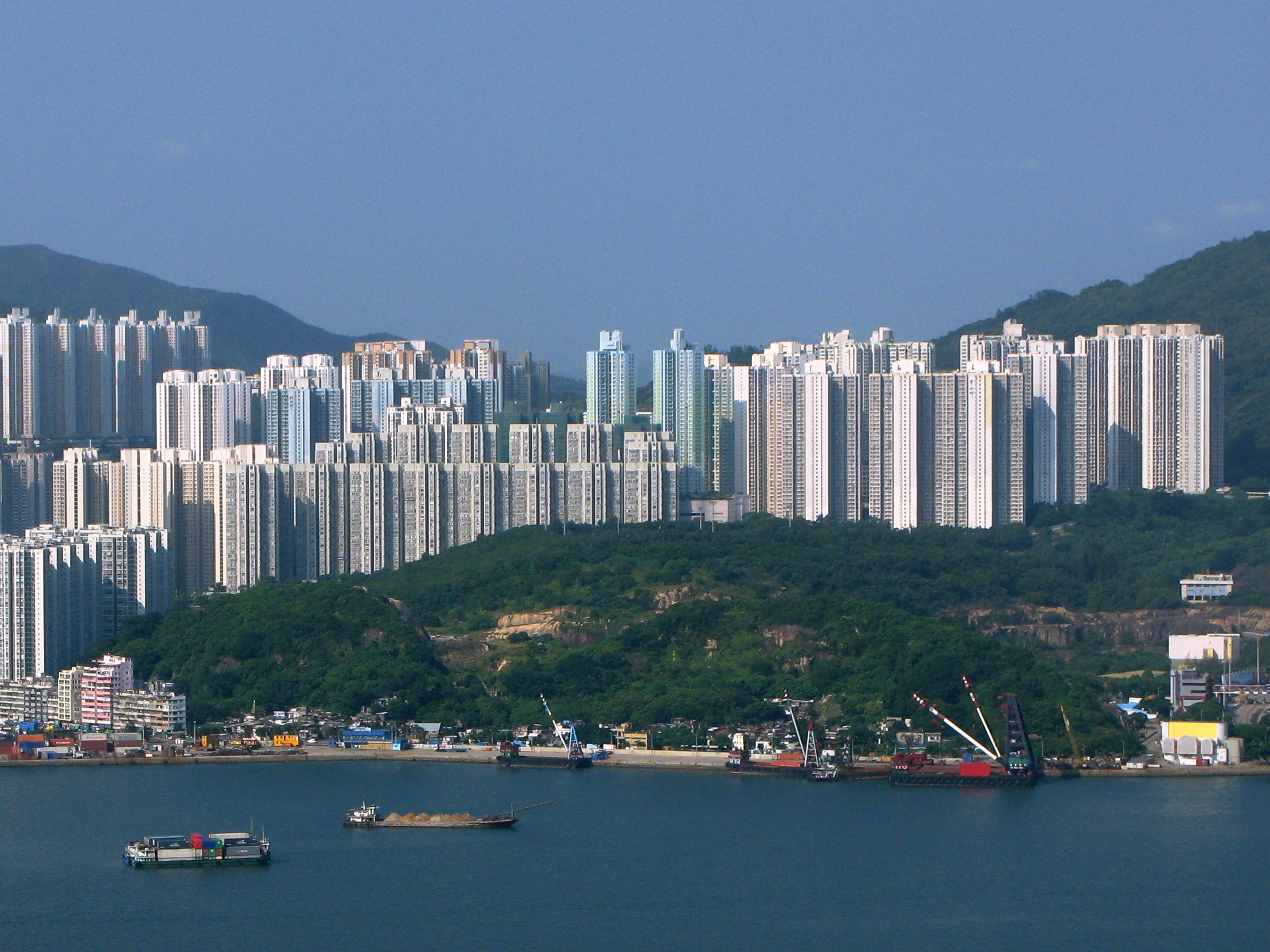
View of Cha Kwo Ling and Lam Tin in September 2009. The settlement along the coast is Cha Kwo Ling Village. The Eastern Harbour Tunnel entrance is visible on the right. Sai Tso Wan Recreation Ground is located at the top of the hill.

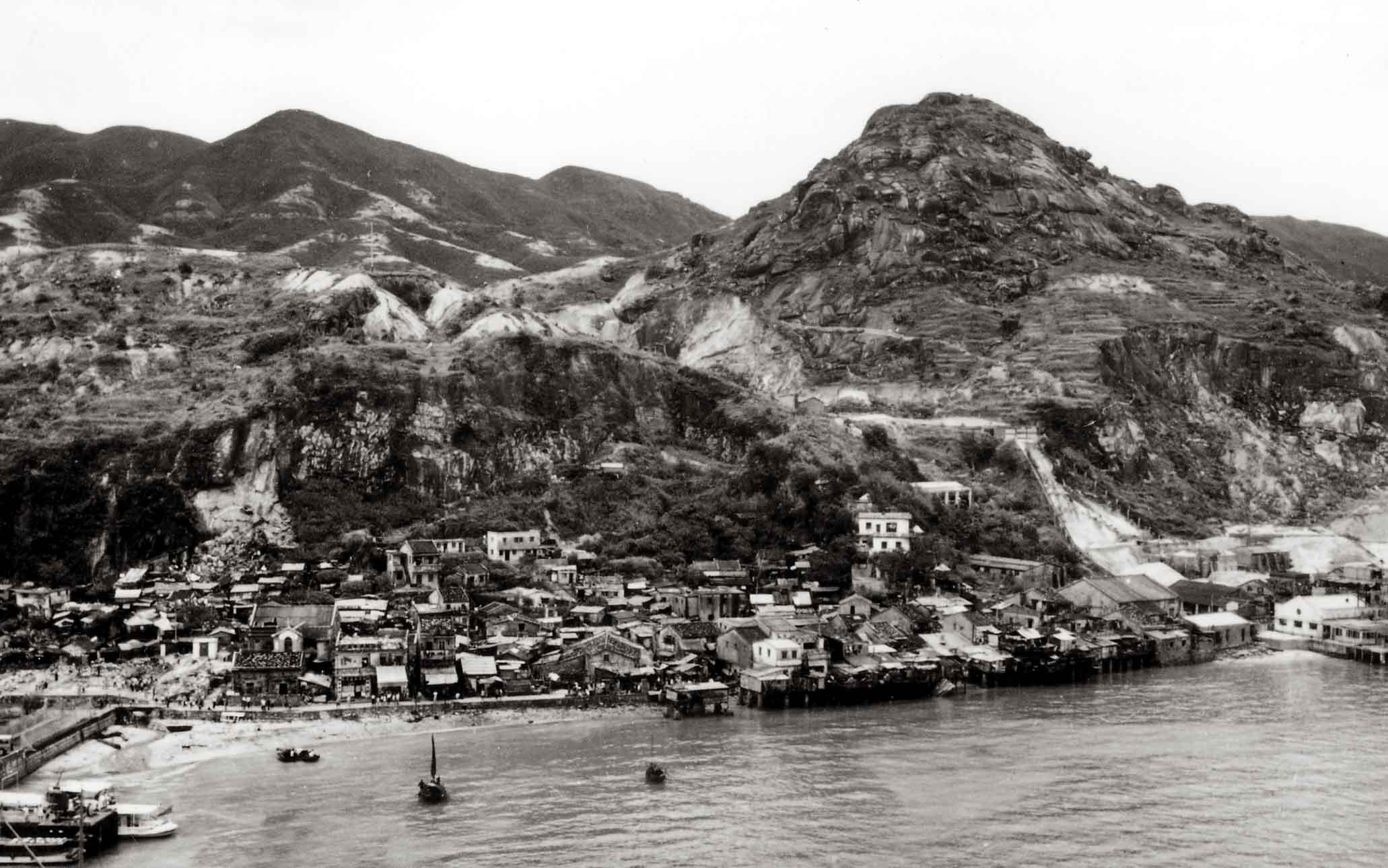
Cha Kwo Ling Village in 1962

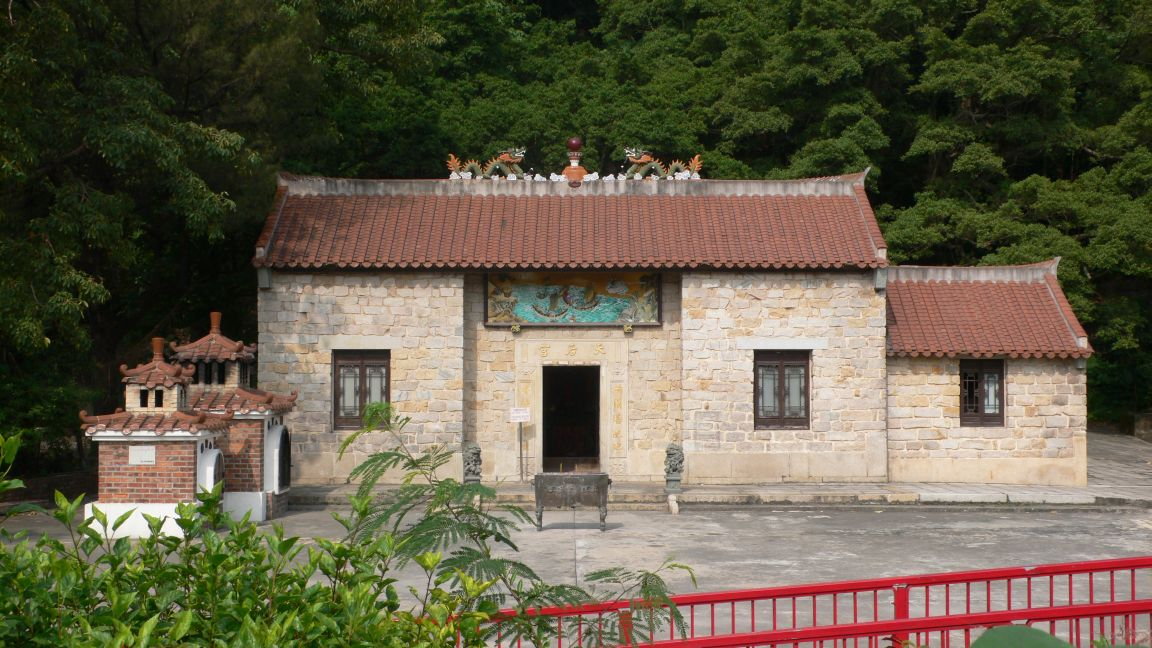
Tin Hau Temple in Cha Kwo Ling in December 2006

Cha Kwo Ling (Chinese: 茶果嶺) is a hill in the eastern New Kowloon area of Hong Kong, and the area around it. It is adjacent to Victoria Harbour and located to the west of Yau Tong and southwest of Lam Tin. Administratively, it belongs to the Kwun Tong District. The northeastern entrance to the Eastern Harbour Crossing is located in this area.

The Cha Kwo Ling Village (茶果嶺村), described as one of the last squatter villages in Hong Kong, has a population of approximately 2,400. It is located approximately 1.4 km (0.87 mi) northwest of Lei Yue Mun, adjacent to the Laguna City development. It lies at the foot of the hill and stretches along Cha Kwo Ling Road, which was built on reclaimed land and separates the village from the coast. In the 2019 and 2020 policy addresses, the chief executive stated that the government intends to take back possession of the Cha Kwo Ling Village and to redevelop the land into high-density public housing.

Cha Kwo Ling derives its name from the abundance of macaranga tanarius in the area, the leaves of which are used in the process of making cha kwo, a traditional Hakka snack.

== History ==
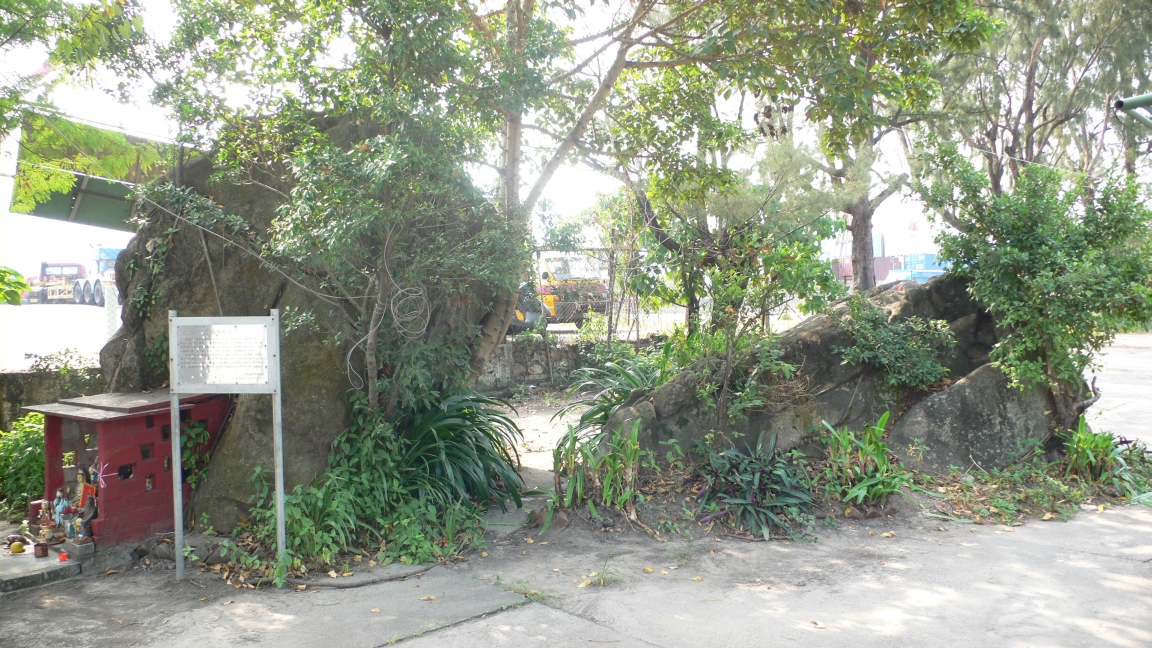
"Child-Giving Rocks" in Cha Kwo Ling in October 2006.

Cha Kwo Ling Village was established before Hong Kong became a British colony. Cha Kwo Ling became a major Hakka settlement after the establishment of Victoria City in 1841. The foundation of city drew a large demand of stone. Skillful Hakka people set up a quarry in the stone-rich Cha Kwo Ling. It was one of four quarry hills and one of the 13 major village districts in eastern New Kowloon. The usage of new building materials later made the demand for stone drop. The population profile changed during the Civil War in China, when penniless refugees from mainland China settled in and around the original mining village, building makeshift shacks in a maze of dark alleys. At its peak between the 1950s and the 1970s, the village had a population of about 20,000. Between 1983 and 2006, three big fires burned down many of the squatter houses and many villagers were relocated to public housing estates.

== Features ==
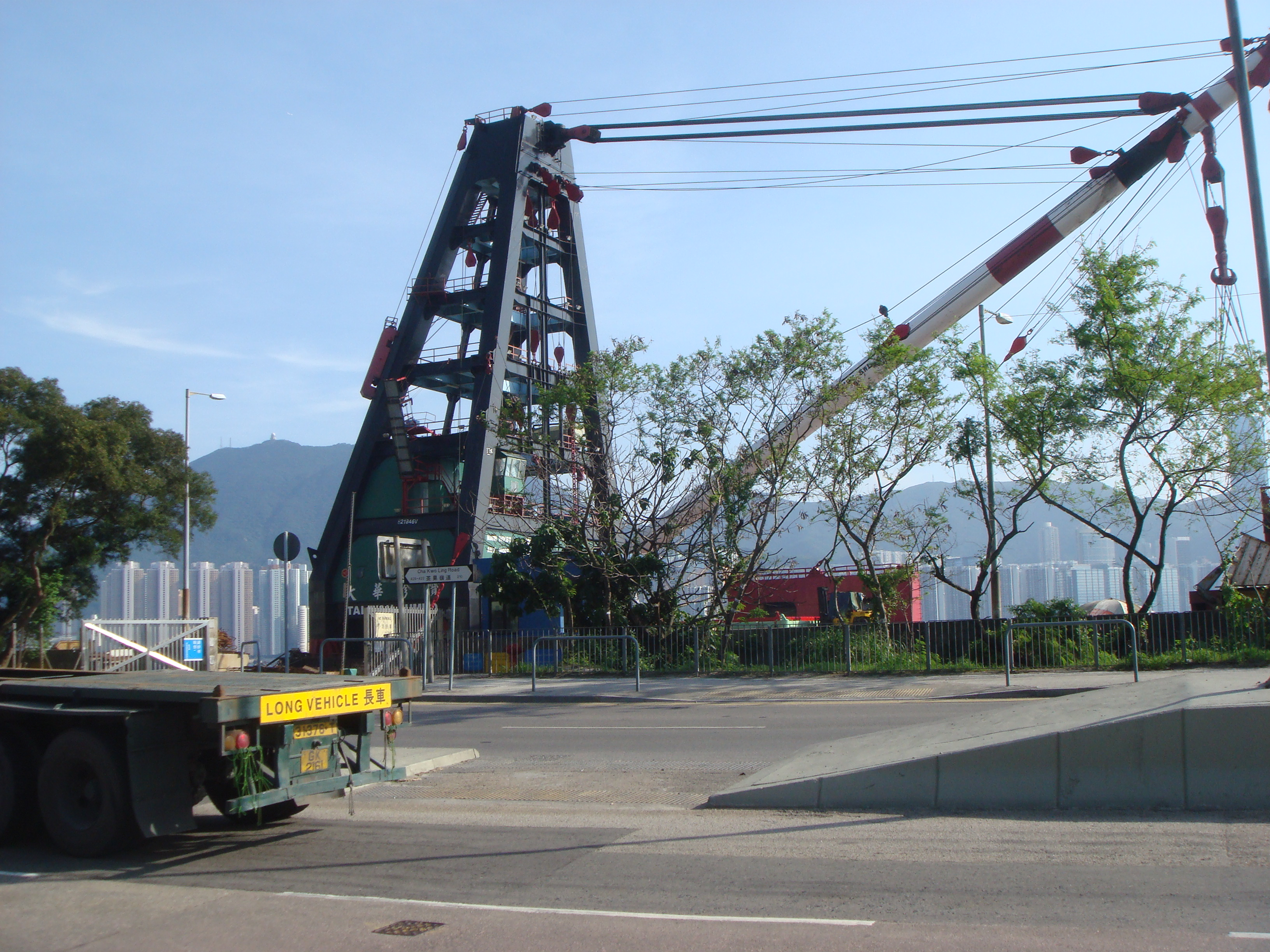
Section of Cha Kwo Ling Road opposite the Tin Hau Temple in 2010. The buildings visible are located on Hong Kong Island, across Victoria Harbour.

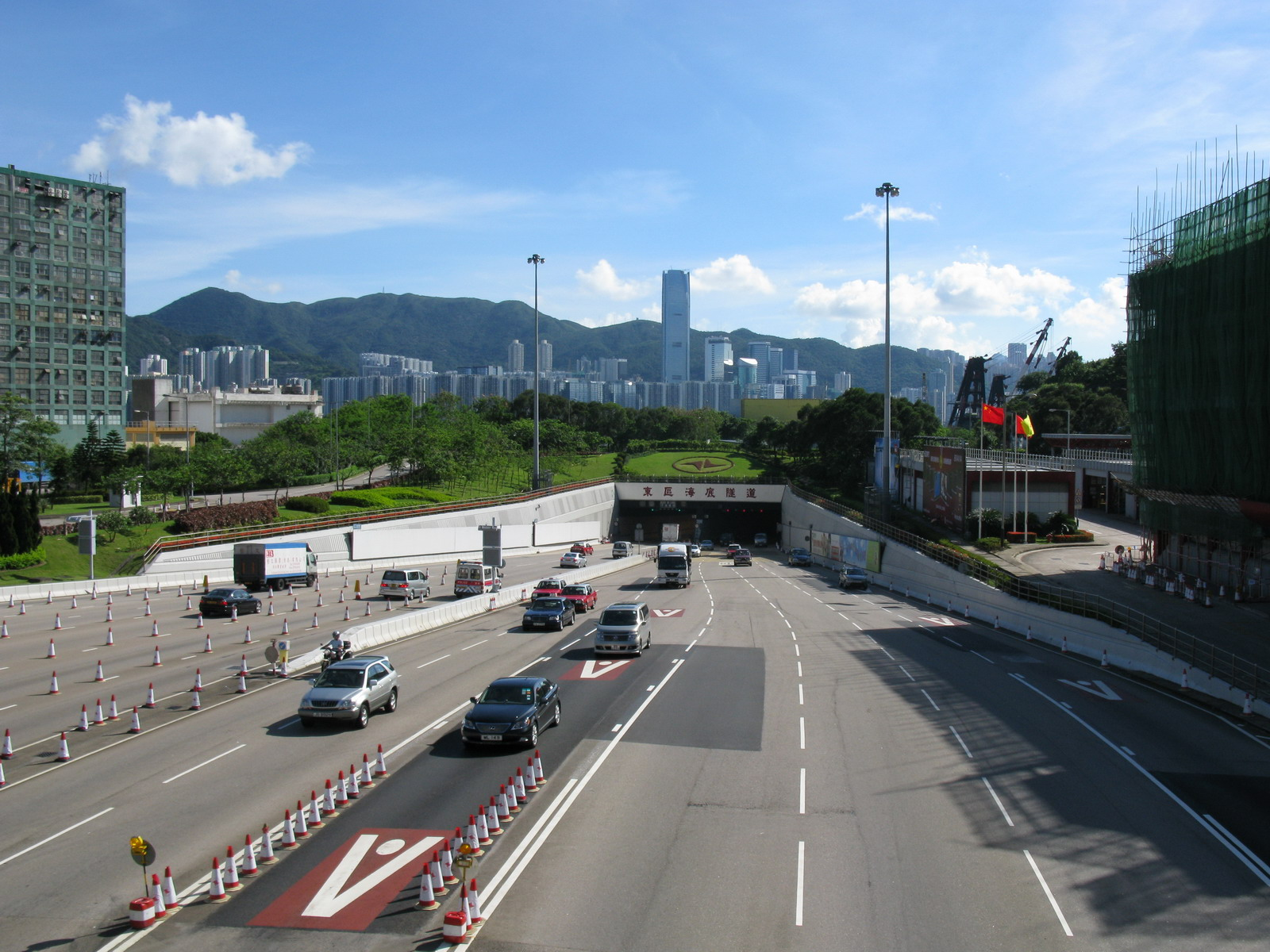
The nearby Eastern Harbour Tunnel entrance in July 2008.

There is a Tin Hau Temple along Cha Kwo Ling Road, next to Cha Kwo Ling Village. Initially built near the coast in Cha Kwo Ling in 1825, during the Qing Dynasty, it was destroyed by a typhoon in 1912. The image of Tin Hau was then transferred to a shack nearby and remained there for thirty years. A new temple was built on the old site in 1941 with funds raised by the local villagers of Si Shan (四山, literally "four hills" composing four villages in the area, namely, Lei Yue Mun, Ngau Tau Kok, Sai Tso Wan and Cha Kwo Ling). However, the temple was demolished in 1947 to give way for the construction of an oil tank of Asiatic Petroleum Company (South China) Limited. At the request of the local residents, a new temple was built at the present site. The current temple opened officially in 1948. It has been managed by the Chinese Temples Committee since then. The building is constructed of granite blocks, which is uncommon in Hong Kong. Its roofs have been covered with brown ceramic tiles in a 1999 renovation.

Two rocks stand in front of the Tin Hau Temple. Shaped like two testicles, they have been named "Fung Shui Rocks", "Child-Giving Rocks" or "Stone of Fertility", and are believed to bless those who pray to them for sons.

Law Mansion (羅氏大屋), located at Nos. 50A, 51 & 51A Cha Kwo Ling Road, is a village house in the centre of Cha Kwo Ling Village. Constructed in 1855 of locally quarried granite, it is the oldest surviving residential building in Cha Kwo Ling.

== Education ==
Cha Kwo Ling is in Primary One Admission (POA) School Net 48. Within the school net are multiple aided schools (operated independently but funded with government money) and Kwun Tong Government Primary School.

== Transport ==
The nearest MTR stations are Lam Tin station and Yau Tong station. Minibus lines connect Cha Kwo Ling to the stations.
