= Ping Shek Estate =

Public housing estate in Hong Kong

Coordinates: 22°20′00″N 114°12′33″E

- Chinese: 坪石邨
- Cantonese Yale: pìhng sehk chyūn
- Literal meaning: plain rock estate
Transcriptions
Standard Mandarin
- Hanyu Pinyin: Píng Shí Cūn
Yue: Cantonese
- Yale Romanization: pìhng sehk chyūn
- Jyutping: ping4 sek6 cyun1

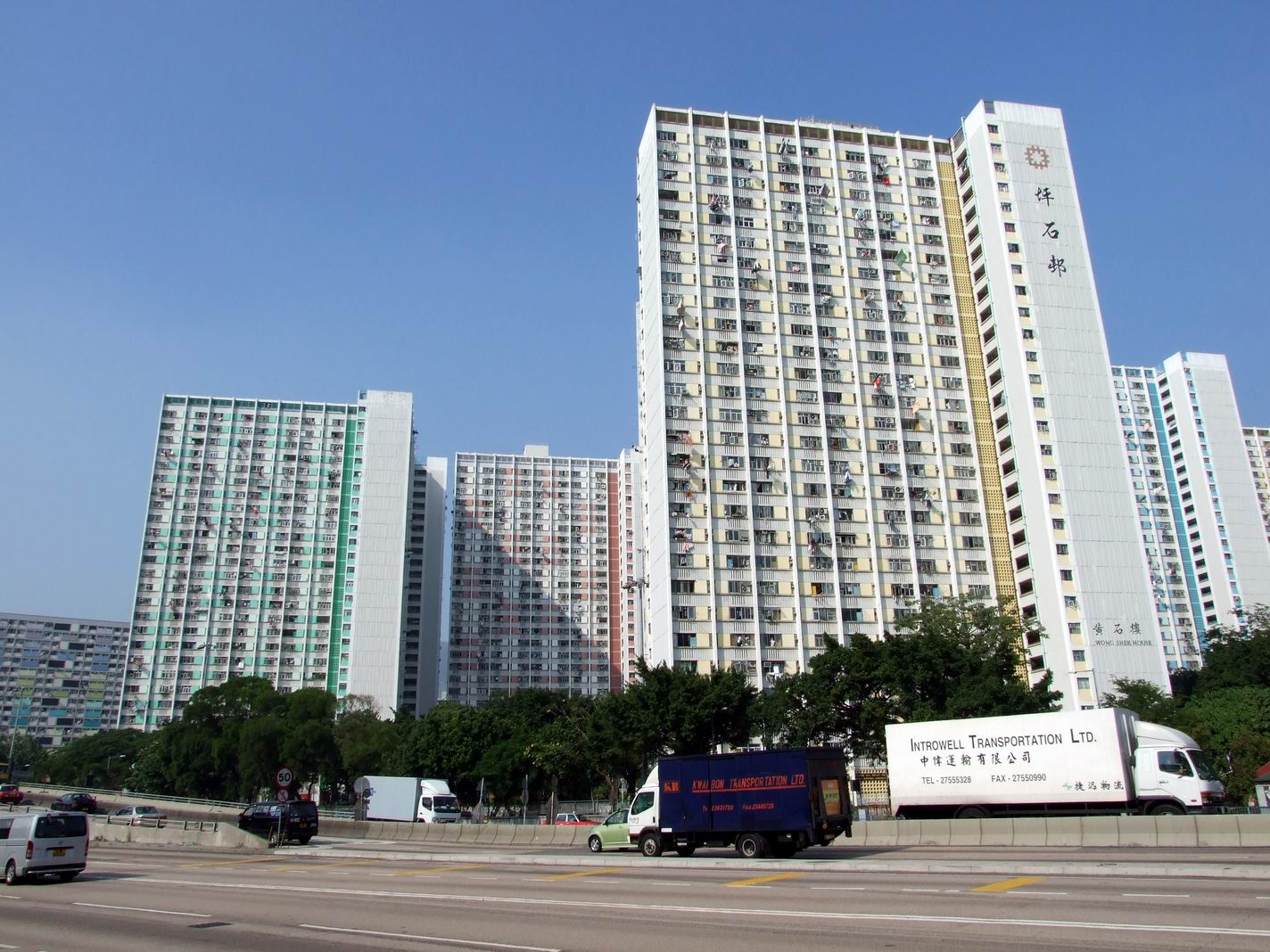
Ping Shek Estate

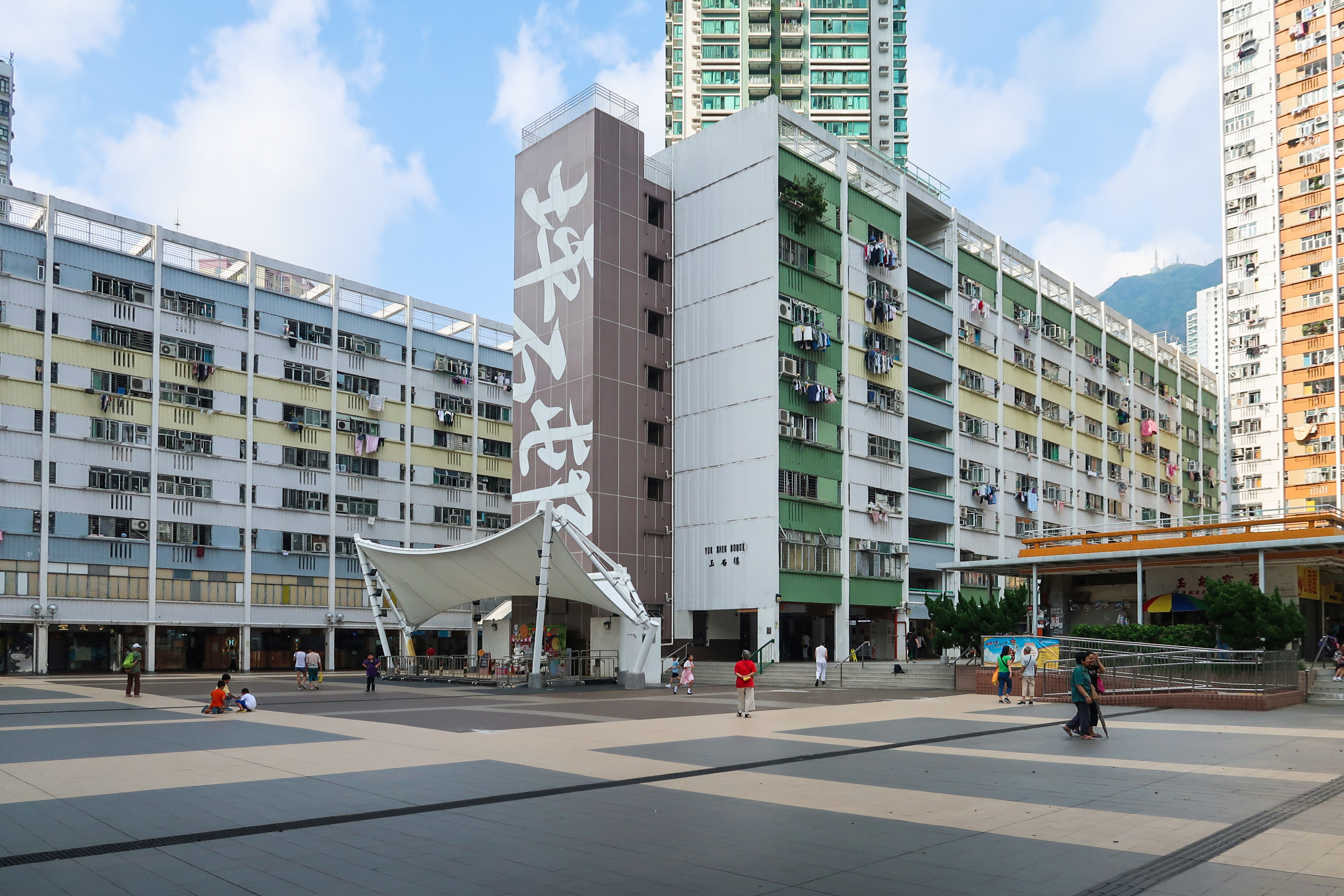
Podium Plaza

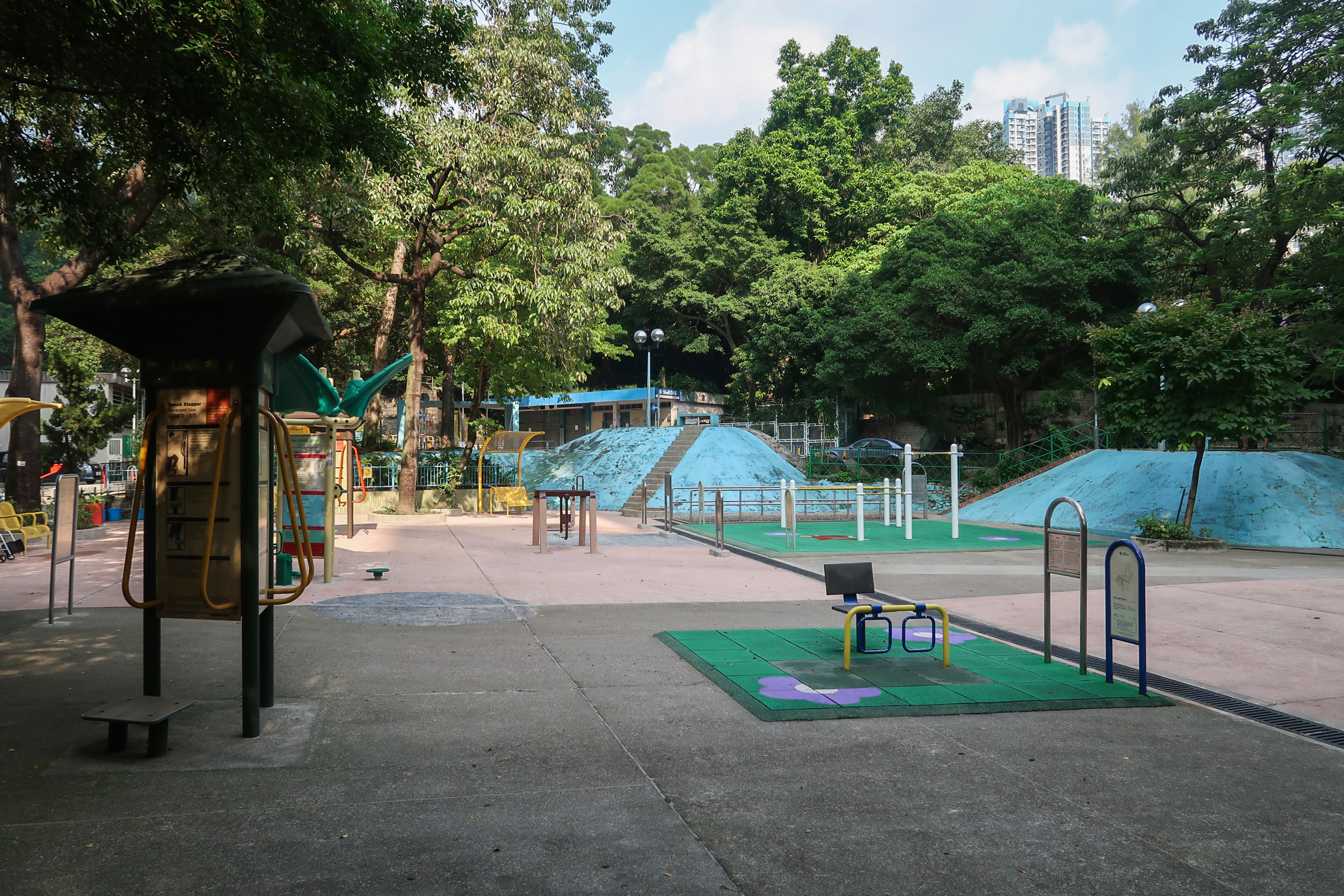
Play area

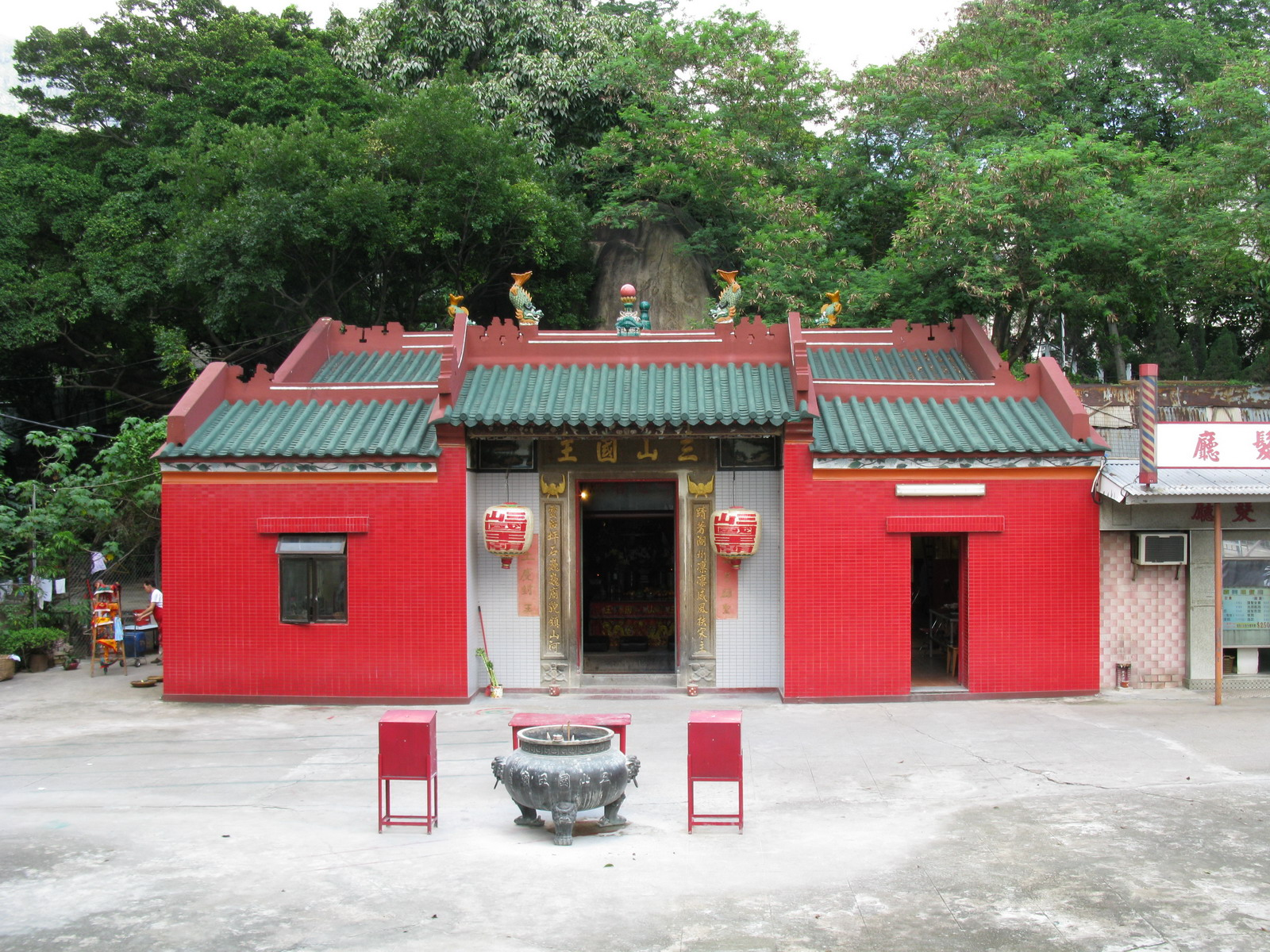
Sam Shan Kwok Wong Temple, next to Ping Shek Estate

Ping Shek Estate (Chinese: 坪石邨) is a public housing estate in Ping Shan, Kwun Tong, Kowloon, Hong Kong. Choi Hung Estate is situated to its west, Ngau Chi Wan Municipal Services Building to its north, Richland Gardens to its south. A section of Lung Cheung Road between Choi Hung Estate and Ping Shek Estate is the boundary between Wong Tai Sin District and Kwun Tong District and belongs to Kwun Tong District. The area covers the Ping Shek constituency for the Kwun Tong District Council.

== Houses ==
There are seven residential blocks in the estates. All are named after stones of various colours in Cantonese language:

Name	Type	Completion
Tsuen Shek House	Old Slab	1970
Yuk Shek House	Old Slab	1970
Kam Shek House	Single Tower	1973
Hung Shek House	Single Tower	1973
Tsui Shek House	Single Tower	1973
Lam Shek House	Single Tower	1973
Wong Shek House	Single Tower	1973

== Temple ==
Sam Shan Kwok Wong Temple (三山國王廟) is located next to the estate, along Kwun Tong Road. “Sam Shan” refers to three famous mountains of Chaozhou in Guangdong, namely Du Shan, Ming Shan and Jin Shan. There are many legendary stories about this. One of them is about the Lords of the Three Mountains who had assisted the Emperor Song Tai Zu to put down the revolt between Liu and Zhang, and so the Deities were granted the title as Lords of the Three Mountains. The Hakkas also worship the Deities and would build a temple in their new migrated place. The temple has been renovated for several times. At the end of the lunar year, there will also be a small flower fair at the open area outside the temple.

== Transport ==
Ping Shek Estate is near MTR Choi Hung station, and there is a bus terminus in the estate.

== Education ==
Ping Shek Estate is in Primary One Admission (POA) School Net 46. Within the school net are multiple aided schools (operated independently but funded with government money); no government primary schools are in this net.
