= Choi Fook Estate =

Public housing estate in Ngau Tau Kok, Hong Kong

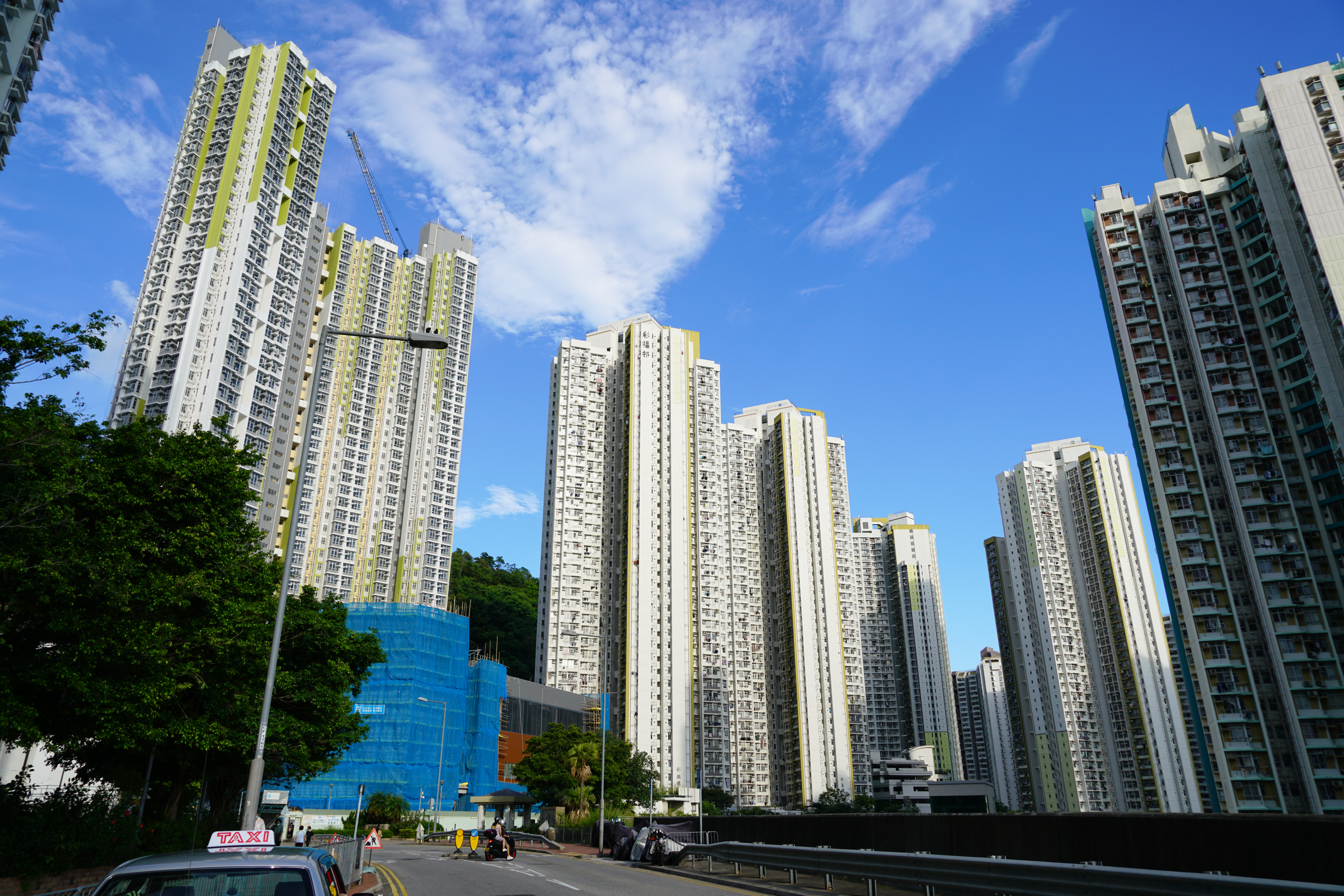
- Choi Fook Estate
- Interactive map of Choi Fook Estate

General information
- Location: 58 Choi Wing Road, Ping Shan; Kowloon, Hong Kong
- Coordinates: 22.328075°N 114.216957°E
- Status: Completed
- Category: Public rental housing
- Population: 9,075 (2016)
- No. of blocks: 5
- No. of units: 4,556

Construction
- Constructed: 2010; 16 years ago
- Authority: Hong Kong Housing Authority

Choi Fook Estate (Chinese: 彩福邨), formerly Choi Wan Road Site 3B (Chinese: 彩雲路3B區), is a public housing estate in Ping Shan, Kowloon, Hong Kong near Choi Ying Estate. Formerly a quarry site, Choi Fook Estate is a part of the housing development near Choi Wan Road and Jordan Valley. It is developed into 3 phases. All blocks in Phase 1 & 2 were occupied in 2010 and 2011 respectively, while other one further block in Phase 3 was occupied in 2021.

== Background ==
The first phase of the estate includes three buildings, Choi Hay House, Choi Lok House, and Choi Sin House. The formalities for occupancy of residents began on 30 July 2010, and the occupancy officially began. There is an elderly community centre in the estate, which was opened with the first phase of occupation; and the second phase of estate, which includes Choi Foon House, was also occupied on 4 July 2011.

Construction of the third phase started in 2016. The project has a three-storey ground floor platform with a gymnasium and a wet market, and a 37-storey residential building Choi Wo House on the platform, providing 950 units and a population of about 2,900. In December 2015, the Housing Authority plans to apply to the Town Planning Board to relax the height restrictions of the relevant lot from 170 metres above sea level to 190 metres, and increase the number of units to 1,110. It was completed by the end of 2020 with a population of 4,160 and had entered occupation on 22 March 2021.

== Houses ==
Name	Chinese name	Phase	Building type	Completed
Choi Lok House	彩樂樓	1	Non-standard (Cruciform)	2010
Choi Sin House	彩善樓	1	Non-standard (Cruciform)	2010
Choi Hay House	彩喜樓	1	Non-standard (Elongated Cruciform)	2010
Choi Foon House	彩歡樓	2	Non-standard (Elongated Cruciform)	2011
Choi Wo House	彩和樓	3	Non-standard (U-shaped)	2021

== Demographics ==
According to the 2016 by-census, Choi Fook Estate had a population of 9,075. The median age was 40 and the majority of residents (98.3 per cent) were of Chinese ethnicity. The average household size was 2.6 people. The median monthly household income of all households (i.e. including both economically active and inactive households) was HK$17,000.

== Politics ==
Choi Fook Estate is located in Jordan Valley constituency of the Kwun Tong District Council. It is currently represented by Frankie Ngan Man-yu, who was elected in the 2019 elections.

== Education ==
Choi Fook Estate is in Primary One Admission (POA) School Net 46. Within the school net are multiple aided schools (operated independently but funded with government money); no government primary schools are in this net.

== See also ==
- Public housing estates in Ngau Tau Kok and Kowloon Bay
