= Choi Tak Estate =

Public housing estate in Ngau Tau Kok, Hong Kong

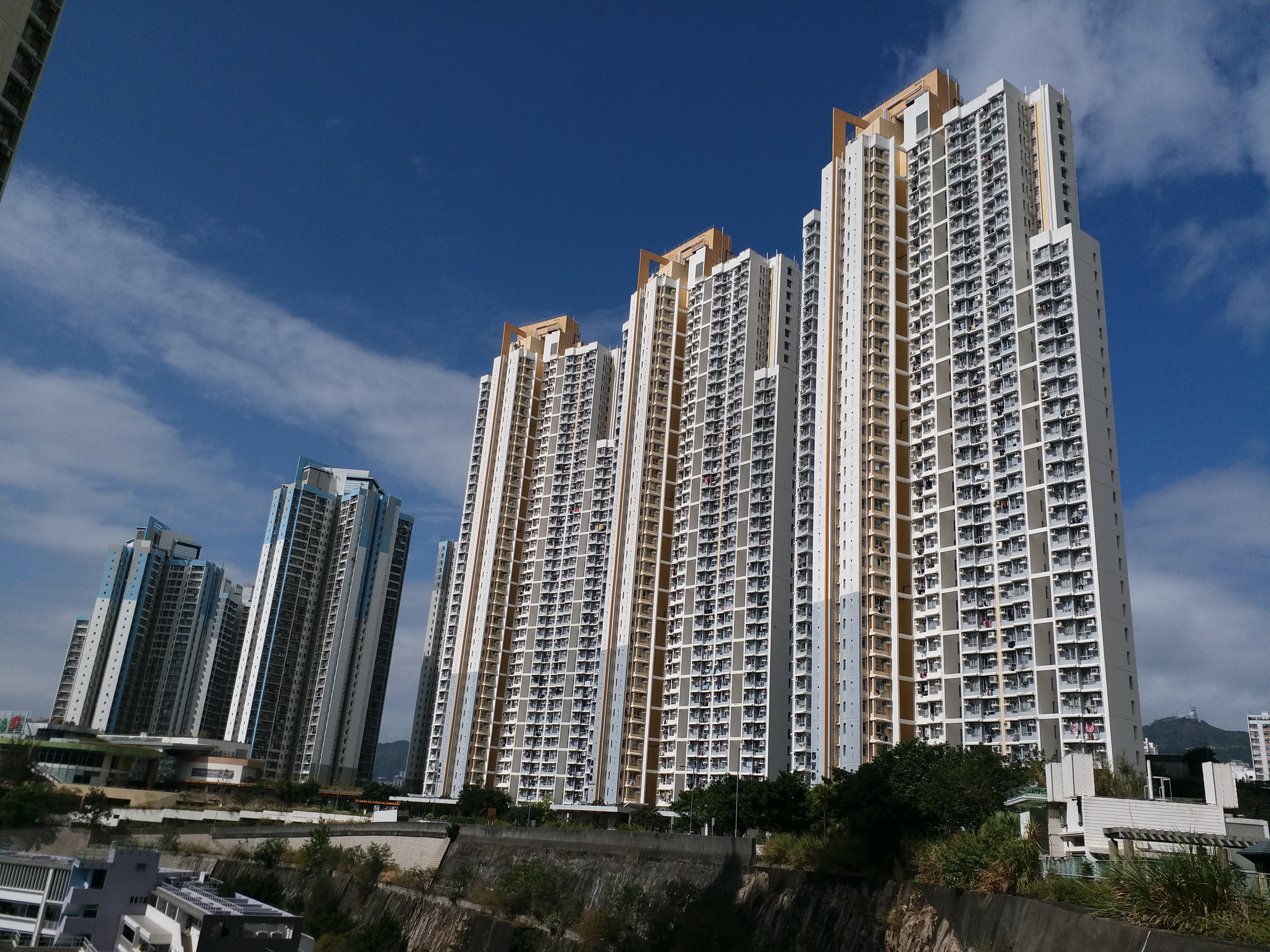
- Choi Tak Estate
- Interactive map of Choi Tak Estate

General information
- Location: 8 Choi Hing Road, Ping Shan; Kowloon, Hong Kong
- Coordinates: 22.330209°N 114.212835°E
- Status: Completed
- Category: Public rental housing
- Population: 17,420 (2016)
- No. of blocks: 8
- No. of units: 5,800

Construction
- Constructed: 2010; 16 years ago
- Authority: Hong Kong Housing Authority

Choi Tak Estate
- Chinese: 彩德邨
Transcriptions
Standard Mandarin
- Hanyu Pinyin: Cǎi Dé Cūn
Yue: Cantonese
- Jyutping: coi2 dak1 cyun1

Choi Tak Estate (Chinese: 彩德邨), formerly Choi Wan Road Site 2 (Chinese: 彩雲路2區) and Choi Wan Road Site 3A (Chinese: 彩雲道3A區), is a public housing estate in Ping Shan, Kowloon, Hong Kong next to Choi Ying Estate. Choi Tak Estate is a part of the housing development near Jordan Valley. It is developed into two phases and all blocks were completed in 2010 and 2011 respectively.

== Background ==
Formerly a quarry site, the Housing Authority had set up the "Choi Wan Road Historical Trail" under Choi King House, Choi Leung House, Choi Yin House and Choi Tak Shopping Centre to convey the historical carrier with pictures and historical display panels for the public to learn about the life and history of the quarry and its surroundings, and promote the history of the quarry to the world.

== Houses ==
| Name | Chinese name | Phase | Building type | Completed |
|---|---|---|---|---|
| Choi Shing House | 彩誠樓 | 1 | Non-standard (Cruciform) | 2010 |
| Choi Shun House | 彩信樓 | 1 | Non-standard (Cruciform) | 2010 |
| Choi Yan House | 彩仁樓 | 2 | Non-standard (Cruciform) | 2011 |
| Choi Yee House | 彩義樓 | 2 | Non-standard (Cruciform) | 2011 |
| Choi Chun House | 彩俊樓 | 2 | Non-standard (Cruciform) | 2011 |
| Choi King House | 彩敬樓 | 2 | Non-standard (T-shaped) | 2011 |
| Choi Leung House | 彩亮樓 | 2 | Non-standard (T-shaped) | 2011 |
| Choi Yin House | 彩賢樓 | 2 | Non-standard (T-shaped) | 2011 |

== Demographics ==
According to the 2016 by-census, Choi Tak Estate had a population of 17,420. The median age was 40.7 and the majority of residents (97.8 per cent) were of Chinese ethnicity. The average household size was 3 people. The median monthly household income of all households (i.e. including both economically active and inactive households) was HK$21,520.

== Politics ==
Choi Tak Estate is located in Choi Tak constituency of the Kwun Tong District Council. It is currently represented by Tam Siu-cheuk, who was elected in the 2019 elections.

== Education ==
Choi Tak Estate is in Primary One Admission (POA) School Net 46. Within the school net are multiple aided schools (operated independently but funded with government money); no government primary schools are in this net.

== See also ==
- Public housing estates in Ngau Tau Kok and Kowloon Bay
