= Ngau Tau Kok =

Area of Kowloon, Hong Kong

Coordinates: 22°19′17″N 114°13′6″E

- Traditional Chinese: 牛頭角
- Simplified Chinese: 牛头角
- Literal meaning: cow head cape
Transcriptions
Standard Mandarin
- Hanyu Pinyin: Niútóujiǎo
Yue: Cantonese
- Yale Romanization: Ngàuh tàuh gok
- Jyutping: Ngau4 tau4 gok3

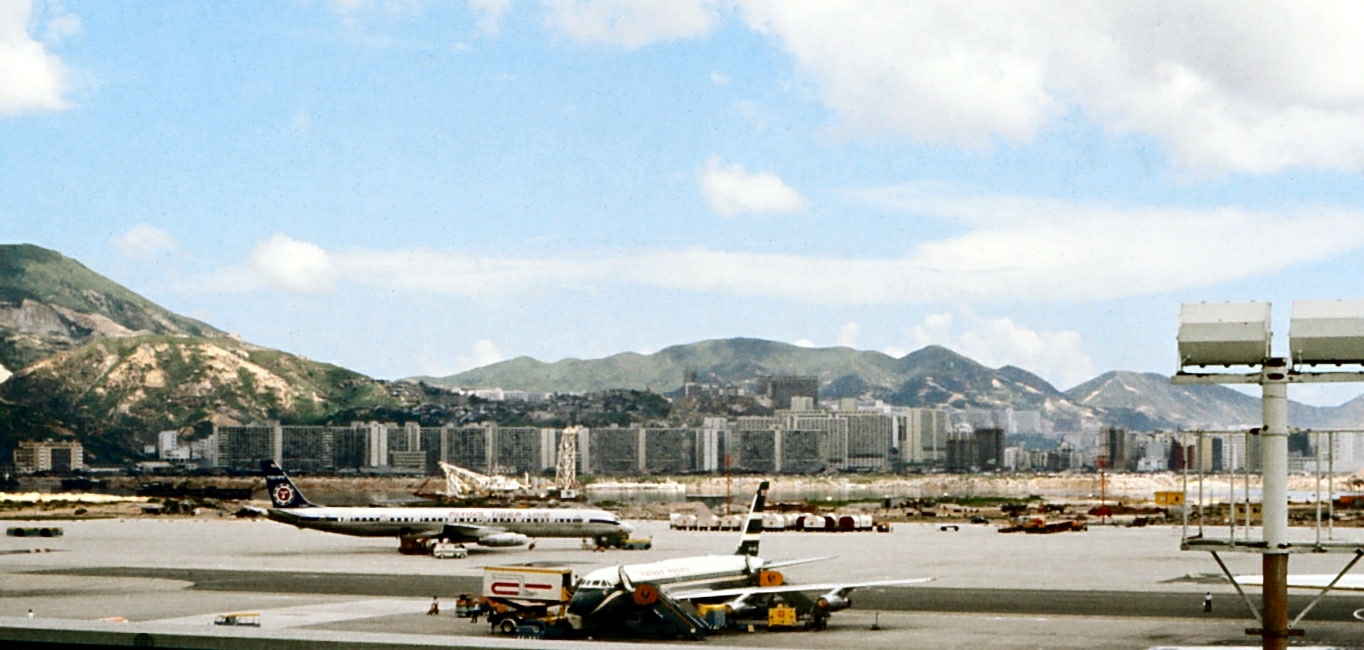
Ngau Tau Kok, viewed from then Kai Tak Airport in 1971

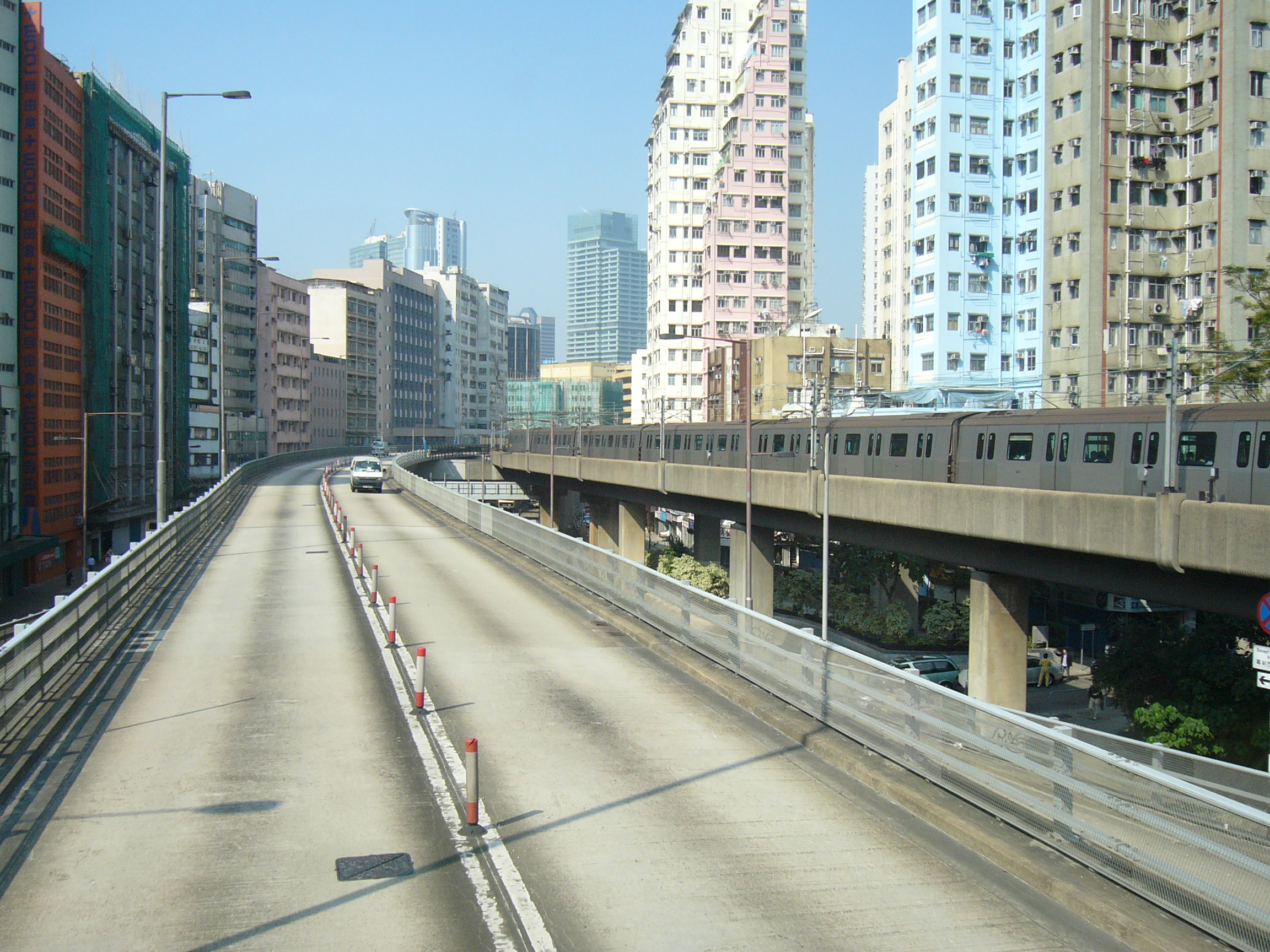
Kwun Tong Road Route 7 flyover near Ting Fu Street

Ngau Tau Kok (Chinese: 牛頭角) is an area of eastern Kowloon in Hong Kong, in the north of Kwun Tong District east to Kowloon Bay. Largely residential, Ngau Tau Kok has a population in excess of 210,000.

== Geography ==
In Chinese, Ngau Tau Kok translates to ox horn or ox head cape - before the reclamation of Kowloon Bay, the coastline of Ngau Tau Kok was shaped like the horn of an ox. Ngau Tau Kok includes two hills - Jordan Valley (Shum Wan Shan) and Crocodile Hill (Ngok Yue Shan), where around half of the residential blocks are located.

Crocodile Hill is a relatively quiet residential area encircled by Kung Lok Road. This road is mainly lined with residential blocks and is home to two parks, the similarly named Kung Lok Road Playground and the Kung Lok Road Children's Playground (about 100 metres apart). The former comprises a cycling area and is linked to the Lok Wah Playground. The latter houses a garden and a children's playground. The two parks were completed by the Urban Council in 1988.

Kung Lok Road is also home to the Mu Kuang English School, founded by Elsie Elliot. Hong Lee Road travels up to the summit of the hill, terminating in a dead end at the St Catharine's School for Girls, founded in 1968.

== Features ==
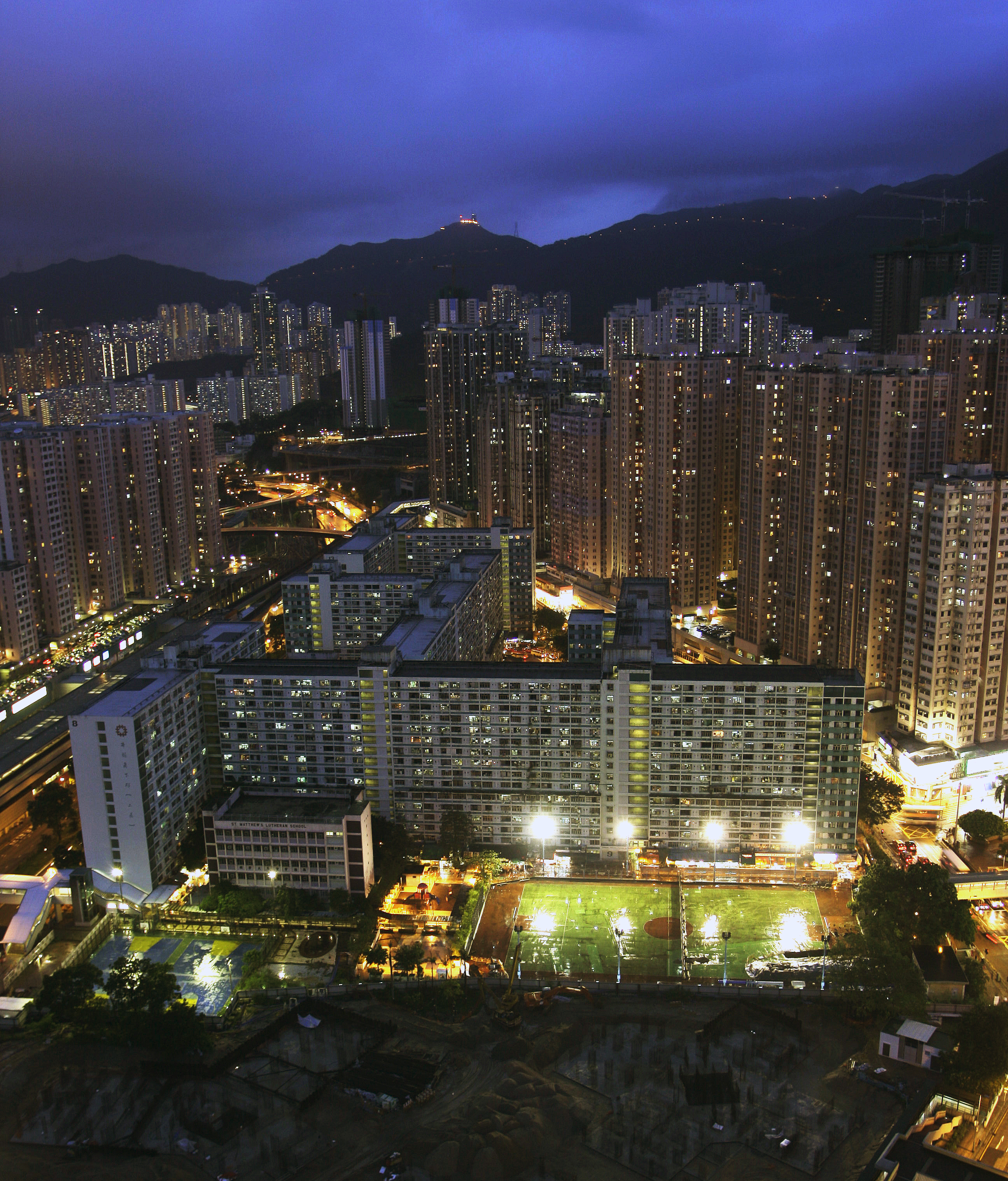
Lower Ngau Tau Kok (II) Estate was demolished in 2010

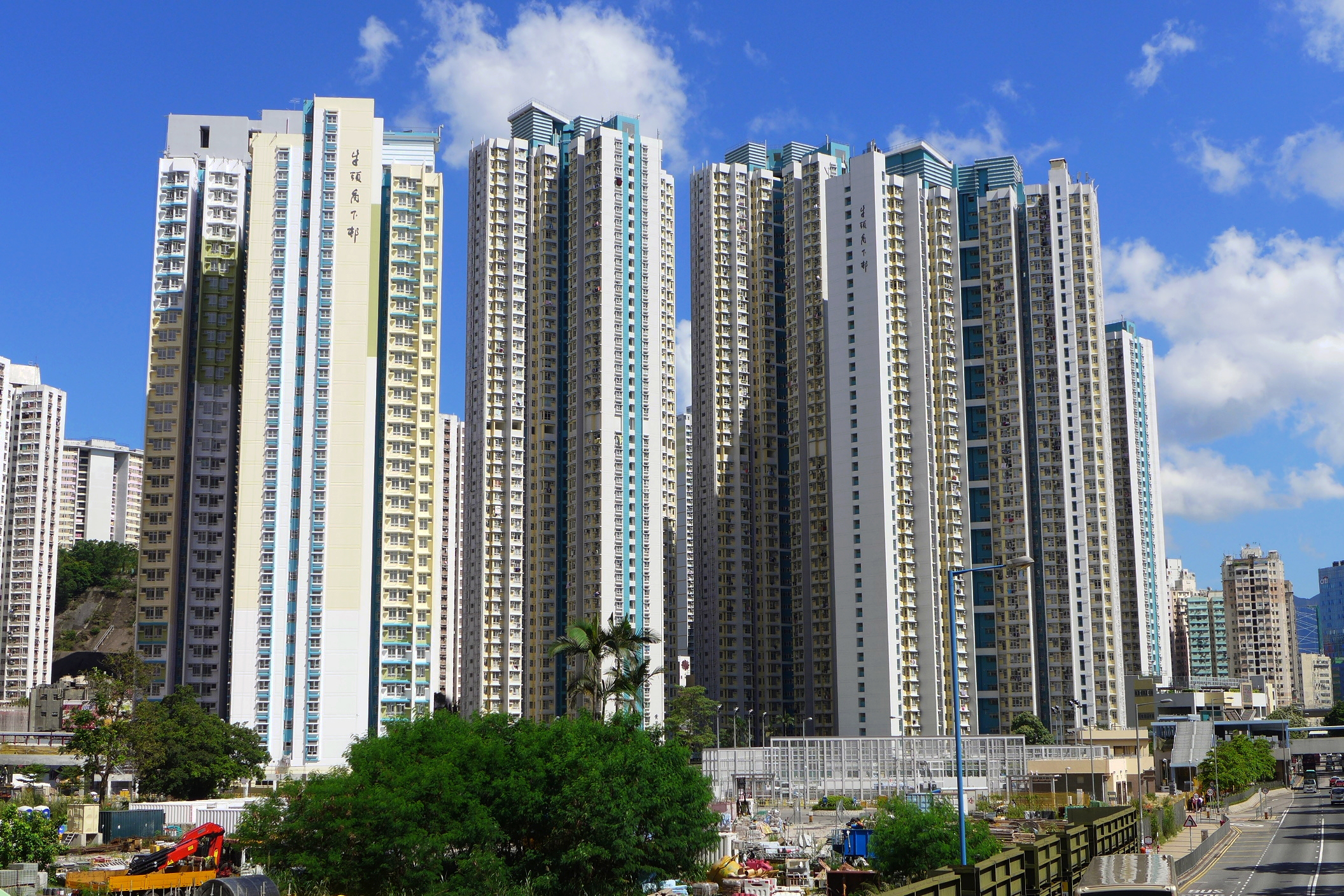
New Lower Ngau Tau Kok (II) Estate after redevelopment in 2015

Ngau Tau Kok is a residential area close to the town centre of Kwun Tong District. The area around Lower Ngau Tau Kok Estate is known for its street food, including congee, noodles and other traditional Cantonese cuisine. In summer, Ngau Tau Kok hosts many religious ceremonies to celebrate the Yu-lan festival, a festival from Chinese ghost tales.

In 2024, the East Kowloon Cultural Centre opened on part of the site of the former Lower Ngau Tau Kok Estate.

== History ==
Ngau Tau Kok has a long history of Hakka inhabitants. In the early colonial days of Hong Kong, it was one of the "Four hills of Kowloon" (九龍四山) in eastern Kowloon where granite was extracted. The granite from Ngau Tau Kok was transported to Victoria City on Hong Kong Island across Victoria Harbour. Some stone was even exported to Canton City for the construction of its Sacred Heart Cathedral.

At the time of the 1911 census, the population of Ngau Tau Kok was 440. The number of males was 314.

Before being a residential area, Ngau Tau Kok was an industrial area. Amoy Food sited a factory in Ngau Tau Kok to manufacture soy sauce. A high-density private housing estate, Amoy Gardens was constructed on the factory site.

A reservoir in Jordan Valley formerly provided fresh water to Ngau Tau Kok but is now disused and used as a landfill area. An artillery battery was also located in Jordon Valley but it was removed to make way for the urban development project.

The site of the MTR Kowloon Bay Depot was formerly the Ngau Tau Kok Industrial Estate.

=== SARS outbreak ===
During the spring of 2003, Ngau Tau Kok was severely impacted by the SARS outbreak. A concentration of cases of the deadly disease occurred in Amoy Gardens (淘大花園), mainly in its Block E. The drainage design (which was widely used across Hong Kong) was later criticised and amended.

=== Town gas explosion ===
On 11 April 2006, a fatal underground explosion occurred on Ngau Tau Kok Road and Jordan Valley North Road: two people died and eight were injured. Wai King Building (偉景樓) was seriously damaged by the blast which was caused by leakage of town gas from underground pipes belonging to Hong Kong and China Gas, a major local utility.

=== 2016 fire ===
Ngau Tau Kok was the site of the Amoycan Industrial Centre fire in which two firemen were killed.

== Transport ==
Major roads in Ngau Tau Kok include:

- Choi Ha Road
- Chun Wah Road
- Elegance Road
- Kung Lok Road
- Ngau Tau Kok Road
- Shun Lee Tsuen Road
- Kwun Tong Road

A MTR station in the northern part of Ngau Tau Kok is named Kowloon Bay station; the Ngau Tau Kok station is located in the southern part of Ngau Tau Kok, which actually near Kwun Tong. Both stations are on the Kwun Tong line.

Kai Tak Airport, Hong Kong's airport was located next door and recently part of it has been converted into a cruise terminal.

== Education ==
Hong Kong Public Libraries maintains the Ngau Tau Kok Public Library in the Ngau Tau Kok Municipal Services Building.
