= Amoycan Industrial Centre fire =

2016 fire in Hong Kong

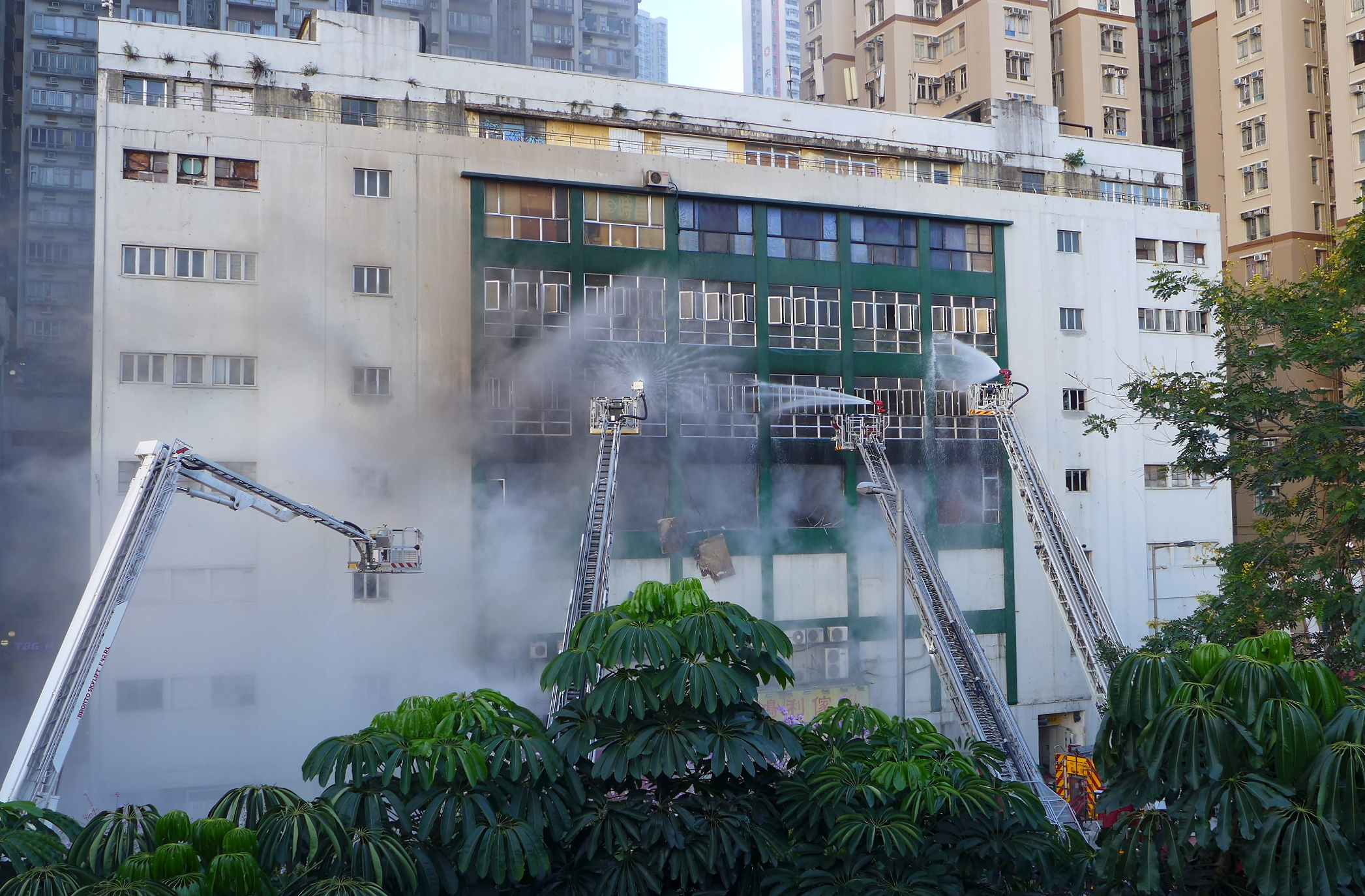
- The fire on 22 June
- Date: 21 - 25 June 2016; 11:00am – 4:00pm (HKT)
- Location: Ngau Tau Kok, Kowloon, Hong Kong
- Coordinates: 22.3264°N 114.2144°E

Impacts
- Deaths: 2

Map
- Location within Hong Kong

The Amoycan Industrial Centre fire began on 21 June 2016 in a self-storage facility housed in an industrial building in Ngau Tau Kok, Kowloon, Hong Kong. The fire was Hong Kong's longest-burning in two decades, and claimed the lives of two firemen.

== Site ==
The Amoycan Industrial Centre Block No.1 is a multi-storey flatted factory building that was 66 years old in 2016. Developed by Amoy Canning, the block's present-day owner is Hang Lung Group, a local developer that acquired the property investment arm of Amoy Food. At the time of the fire it housed several tenants including small factories, a church, and SC Storage, a mini-warehouse self-storage facility where the fire began. Owing to the building's age, it was legally exempt from installing a sprinkler system.

== Fire ==
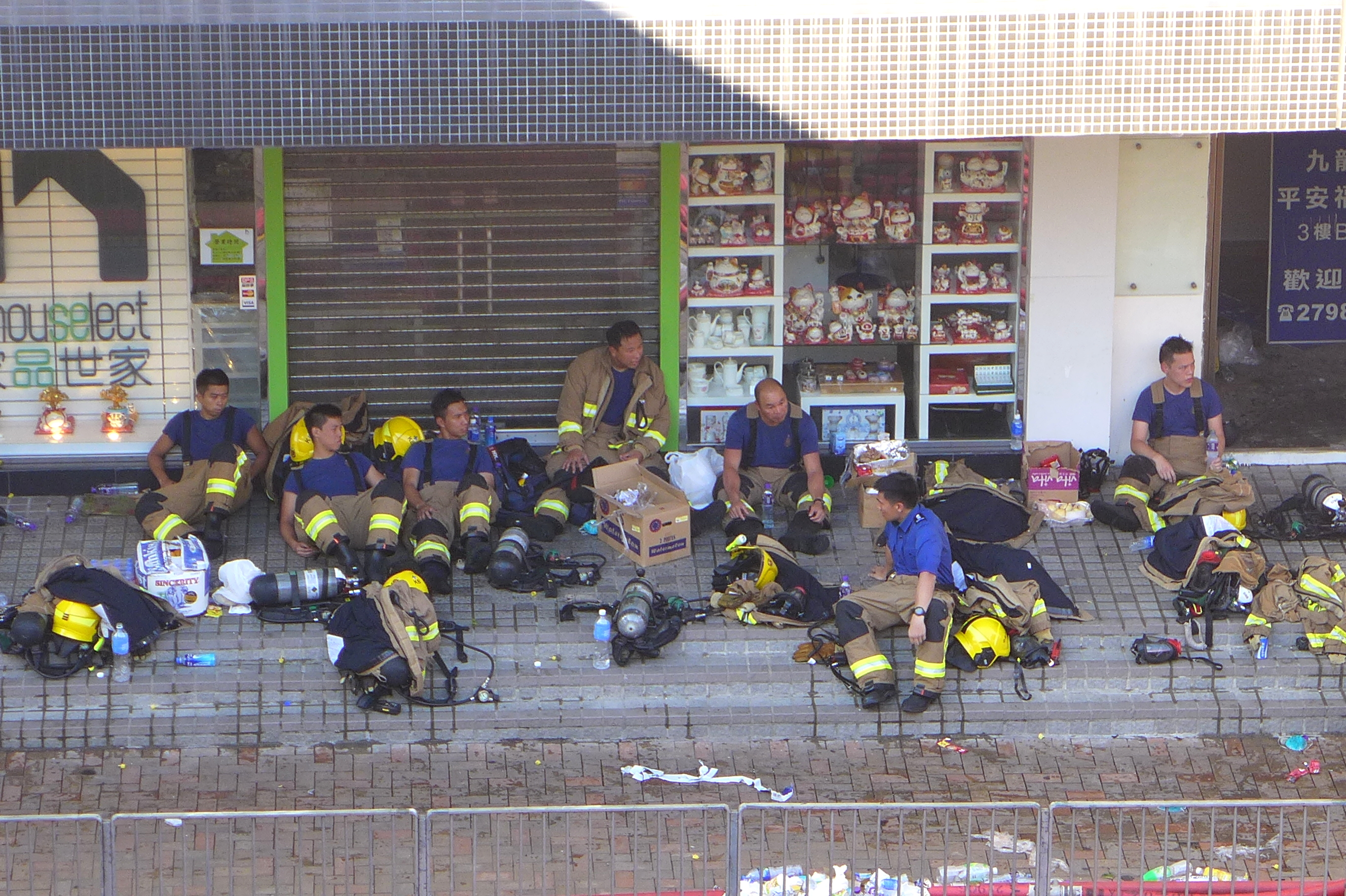
Exhausted firefighters resting

The fire originated on the third floor of the building at SC Storage at 11:00 am on 21 June 2016. It was upgraded to a three-alarm fire at 12:14 pm before being further upgraded to a four-alarm level at 7:46 pm.

It burned for 108 hours.

== Casualties ==
Thomas Cheung Yiu-sing, 30, a senior officer attached to the Fire and Ambulance Services Academy in Tseung Kwan O, was part of the first breathing apparatus team to enter. The inferno suddenly intensified and Cheung was lost in the smoke. He was rescued and rushed to United Christian Hospital, where he was certified dead at 9:54 pm.

Senior fireman Samuel Hui Chi-kit, 37, of Kwun Tong Fire Station, died in hospital on 23 June.

== Structural safety ==
During the fire large cracks appeared in the building. A group of engineers spoke out urging the cessation of efforts to save the property inside, instead advocating a controlled demolition of the building for the sake of safety. Experts suggested that the steel reinforcement within the ceiling and walls of the third floor had weakened, and that the ceiling was liable to collapse, which would lead to a "domino effect" causing a catastrophic structural failure.

Secretary for Security Lai Tung-kwok said that halting efforts to extinguish the fire would not be a responsible option.

== Air quality ==
The Clean Air Network, a non-governmental organisation that advocates better air quality in Hong Kong, reported that the air around the fire was up to 80 times more harmful to health than the World Health Organization standard. Lawmaker Wu Chi-wai called on the government to open the holiday camps and provide transport so that nearby residents of Ngau Tau Kok and Telford Gardens could choose to sojourn there.

== Aftermath ==
The two fire services officers who died were posthumously awarded the gold medal for bravery in July 2016. In 2022, the Coroner's Court ruled that they died by misadventure.
