= Lower Ngau Tau Kok (II) Estate =

Public housing estate in Hong Kong

Lower Ngau Tau Kok Estate
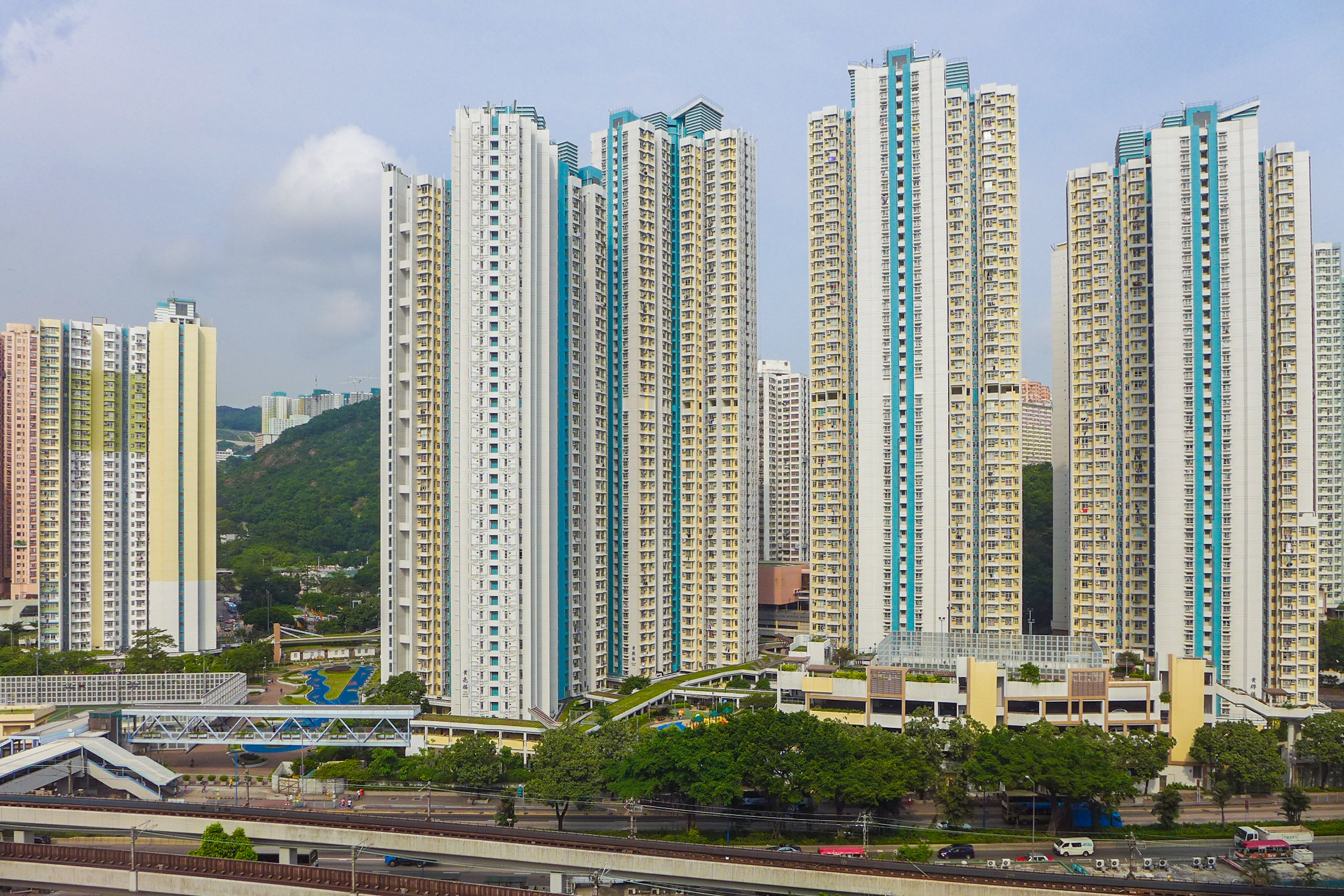
- New Lower Ngau Tau Kok Estate
- Interactive map of Lower Ngau Tau Kok Estate

General information
- Location: 120 Ngau Tau Kok Rd, Kwun Tong, Kowloon, Hong Kong
- Coordinates: 22.3218°N 114.2155°E
- Status: Completed
- Category: Public rental housing
- Area: 152–410 ft^{2}
- Population: 4,800 (households), 11,800 (people)
- No. of blocks: 6
- No. of units: 4,806

Construction
- Constructed: 2012; 14 years ago, 2015; 11 years ago
- Authority: Hong Kong Housing Authority

Lower Ngau Tau Kok (II) Estate
- Traditional Chinese: 牛頭角下邨（二區） 牛頭角下（二）邨
- Simplified Chinese: 牛头角下邨（二区） 牛头角下（二）邨
- Cantonese Yale: Ngàuh tàuh gok hah chyūn
Transcriptions
Standard Mandarin
- Hanyu Pinyin: Niútóujiǎo xià Cūn
Yue: Cantonese
- Yale Romanization: Ngàuh tàuh gok hah chyūn
- Jyutping: Ngau4 tau4 gok3 haa6 cyun1

Lower Ngau Tau Kok (II) Estate was a 7-block public housing estate built on reclaimed land in Ngau Tau Kok, Kwun Tong, Kowloon, Hong Kong, located opposite Kowloon Bay station on the MTR. The demolition of the estate started in March 2010. The estate, along with the Lower Ngau Tau Kok (I) Estate, which was demolished in June 2004, formed the Lower Ngau Tau Kok Estate. A new estate, retaining the name Lower Ngau Tau Kok Estate, is being constructed on the site.

The estate was often described as the last resettlement estate in Hong Kong.

== History ==
Old Lower Ngau Tau Kok Estate
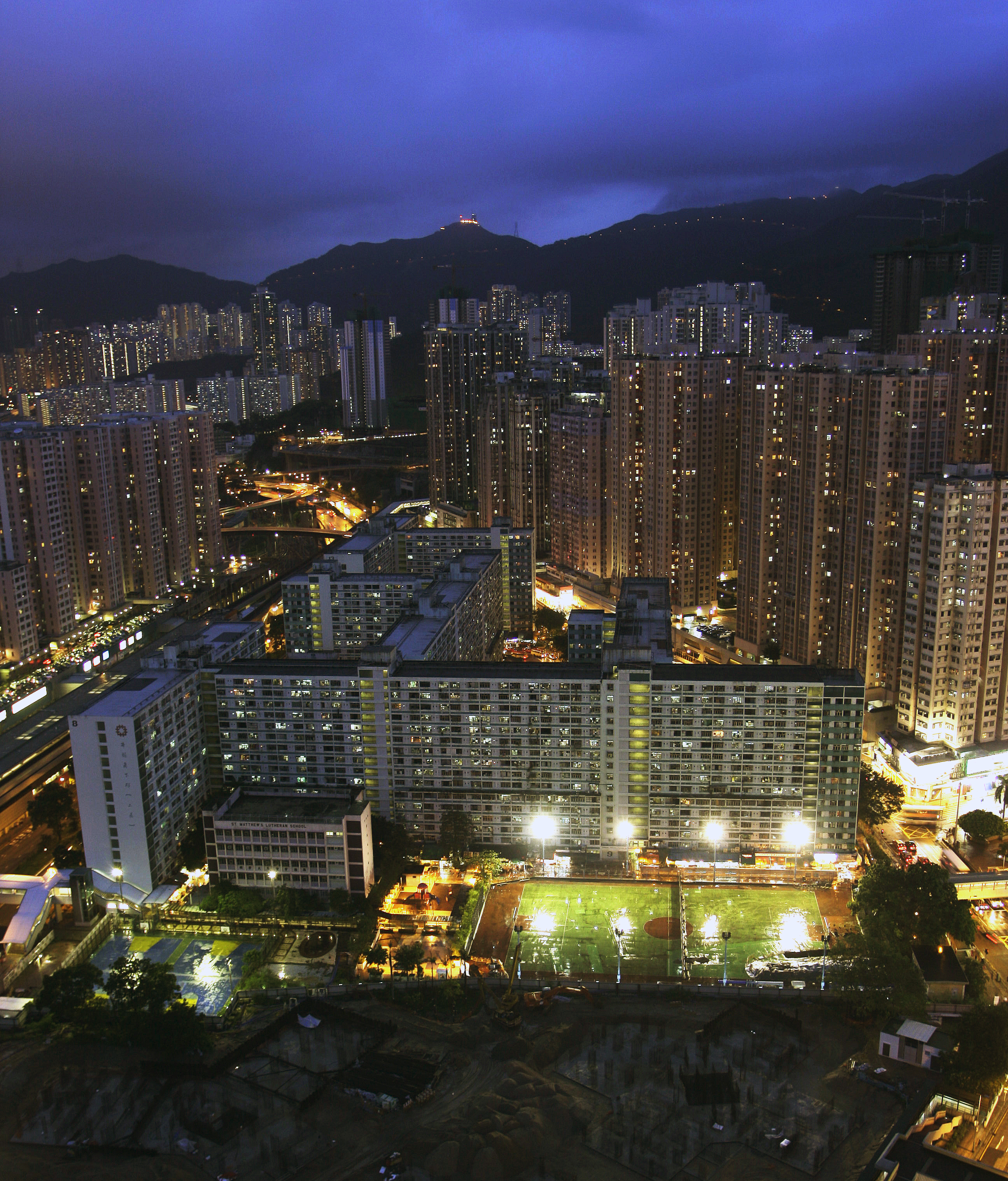
- Old Lower Ngau Tau Kok Estate (before demolition)
- Interactive map of Old Lower Ngau Tau Kok Estate

General information
- Location: 120 Ngau Tau Kok Rd, Kwun Tong, Kowloon, Hong Kong
- Coordinates: 22.3218°N 114.2155°E
- Status: Demolished
- Category: Public rental housing
- No. of blocks: 14 (Blocks 1-7, Blocks 8-14)

Construction
- Constructed: 1969; 57 years ago
- Authority: Hong Kong Housing Authority

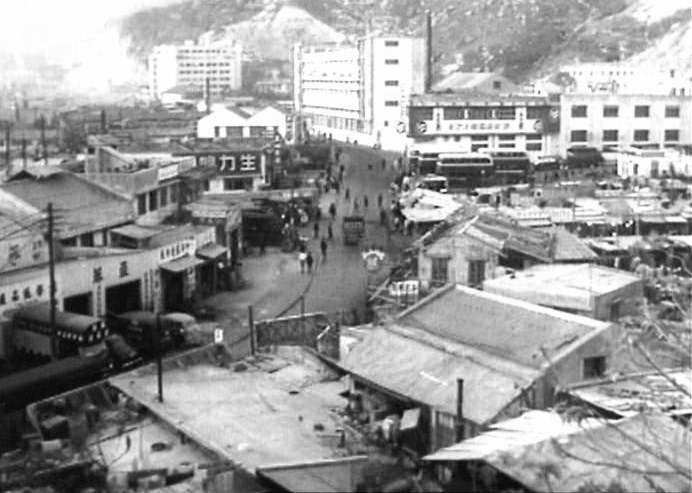
Ngau Tau Kok Village before destruction (1950)

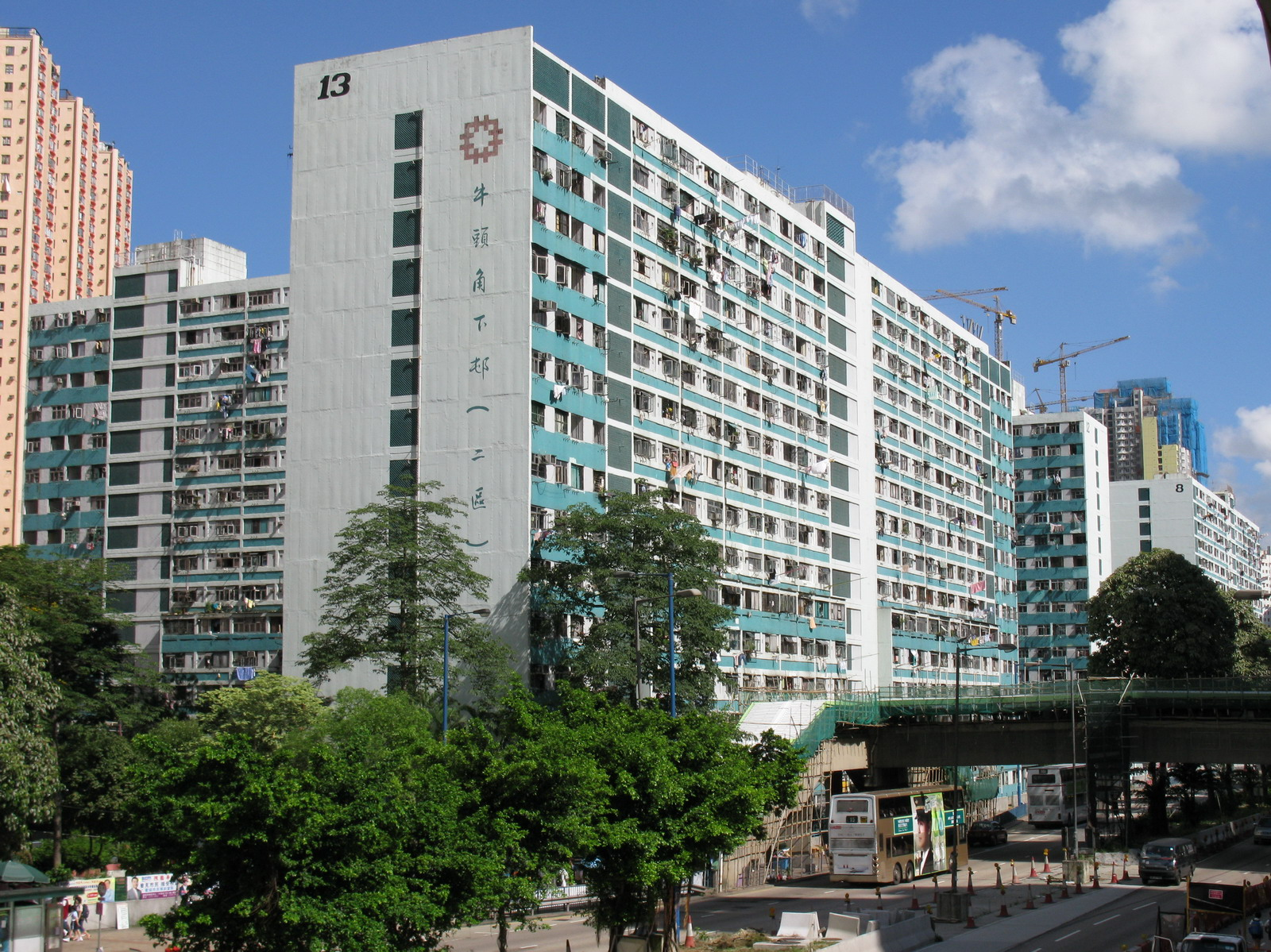
Block 10 of Lower Ngau Tau Kok (II) Estate in 2006

Map of Lower Ngau Tau Kok Estate

Lower Ngau Tau Kok Estate was formerly Ngau Tau Kok Village. It was built in the 1967 to 1969 as a resettlement estate. Ngau Tau Kok Estate was split into Lower Ngau Tau Kok Estate and Upper Ngau Tau Kok Estate in 1973. Blocks 8 to 12 were the first resettlement blocks in Hong Kong to be built with prefabricated parts. Year of intake for Lower Ngau Tau Kok (II) Estate was 1967. It has six streets that surround the estate. The first half of the original estate, Lower Ngau Tau Kok (I) Estate, was demolished in 2004. The demolition works of the remaining half, Lower Ngau Tau Kok (II) Estate, started in March 2010 and are being conducted by the China State Construction Engineering (Hong Kong) Limited.

=== Gallery pre-reconstruction ===
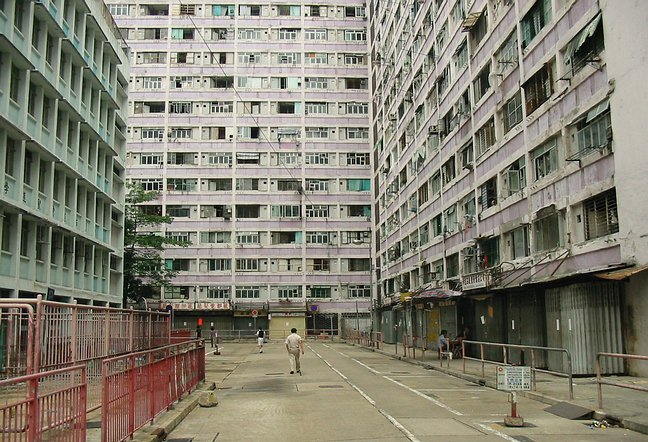
Block 6 (May 2005)

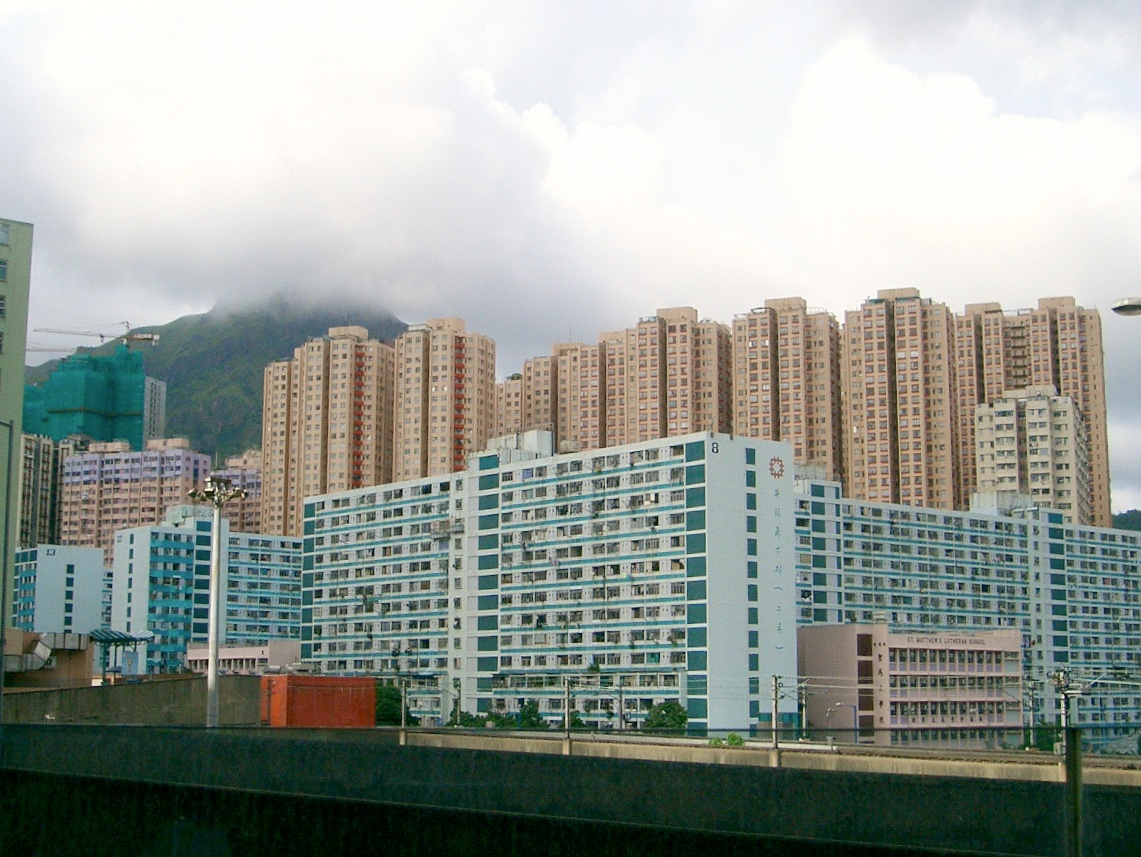
Lower Ngau Tau Kok Estate in 2007.

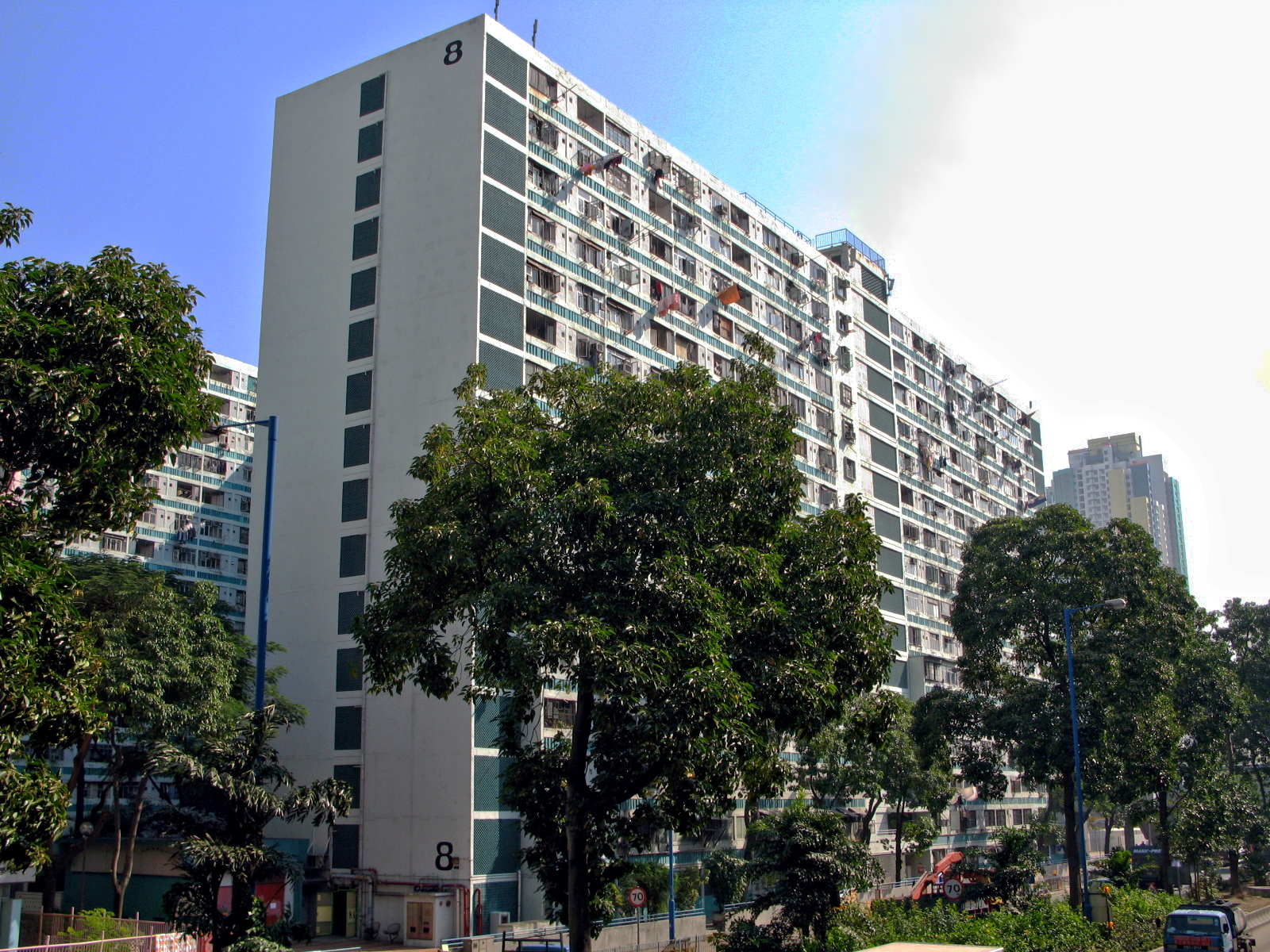
Block 8 in January 2009.

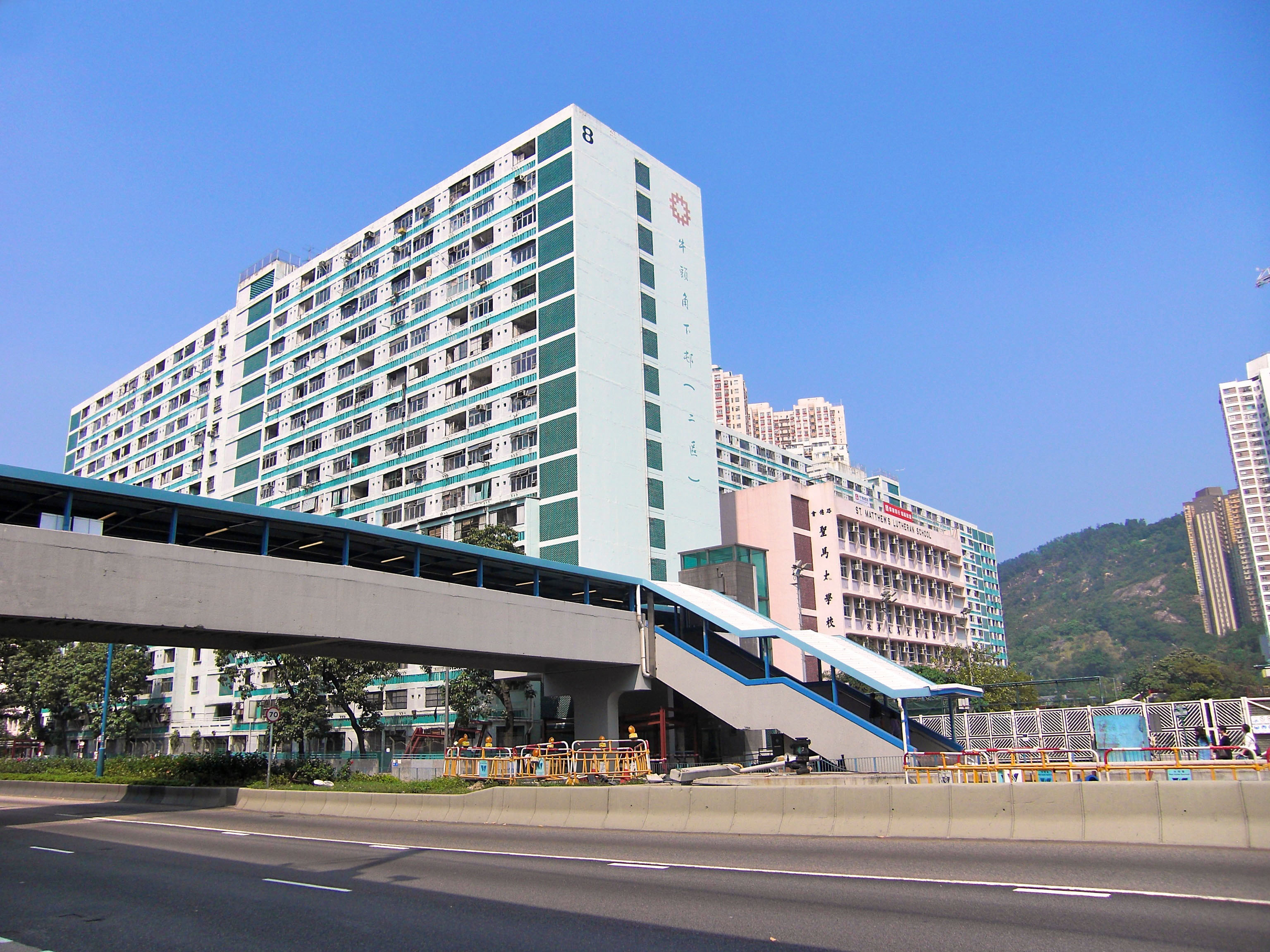
Block 89 in March 2010.

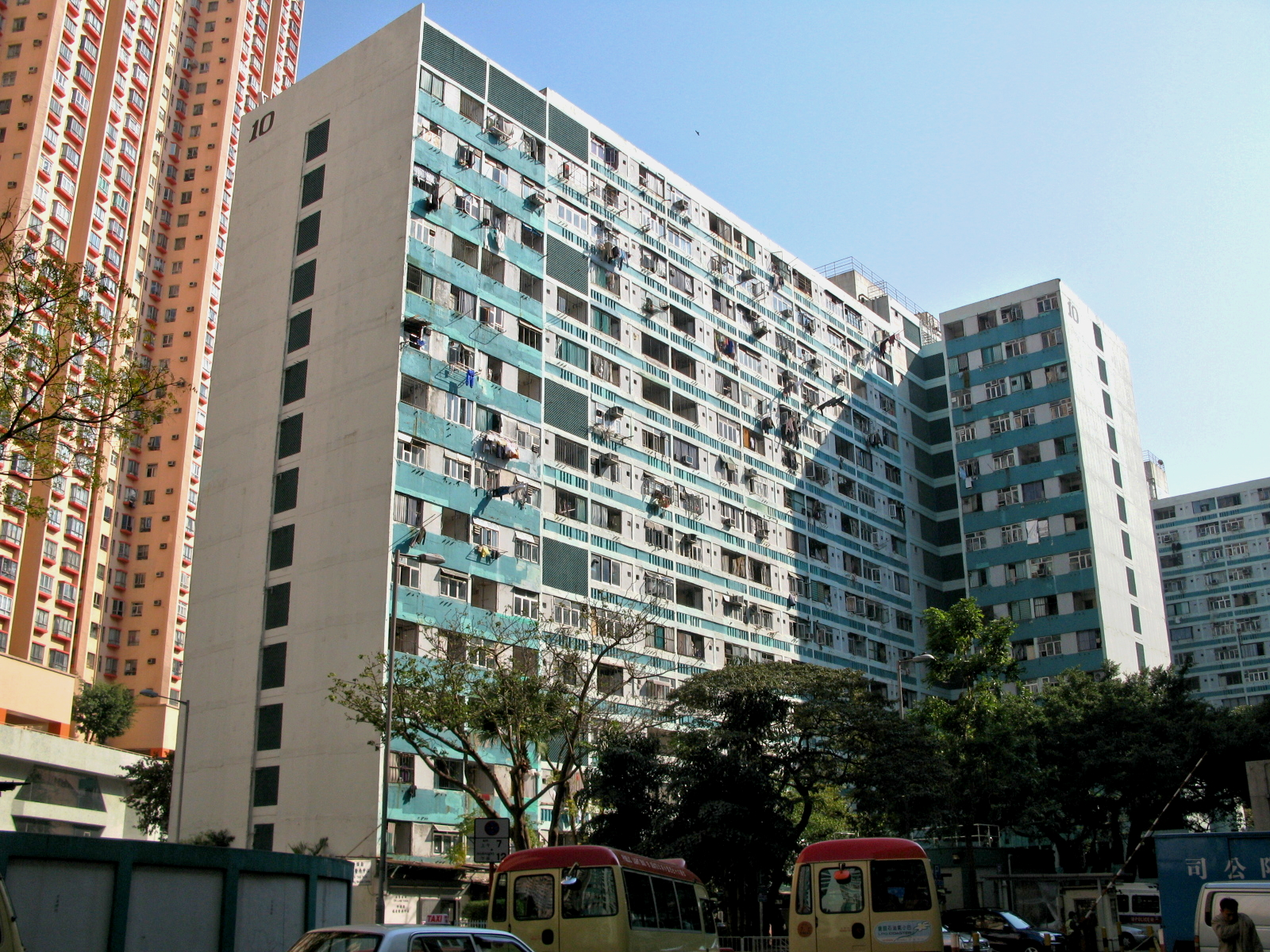
Block 10 in January 2009.

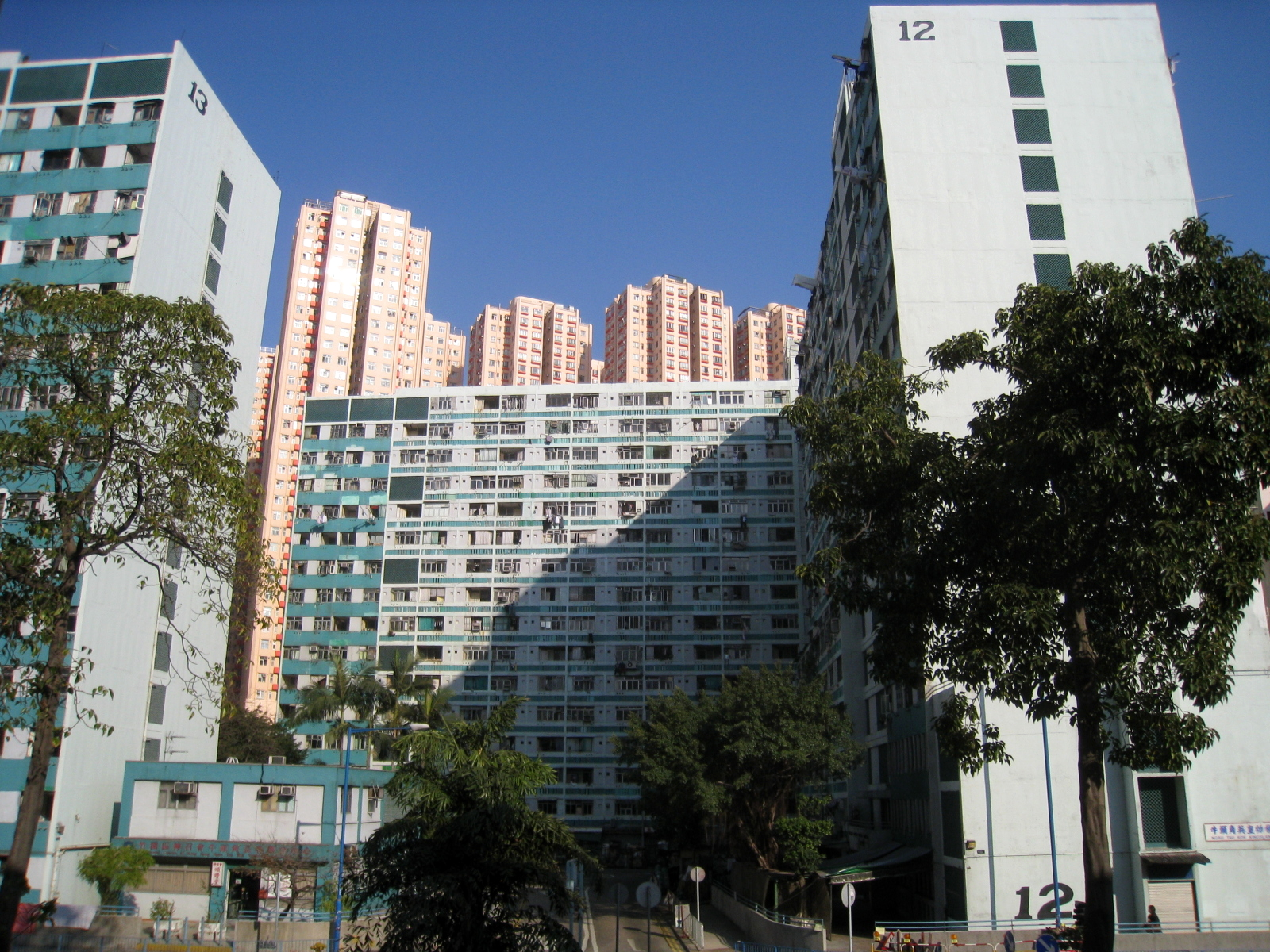
Block 12 in January 2009.

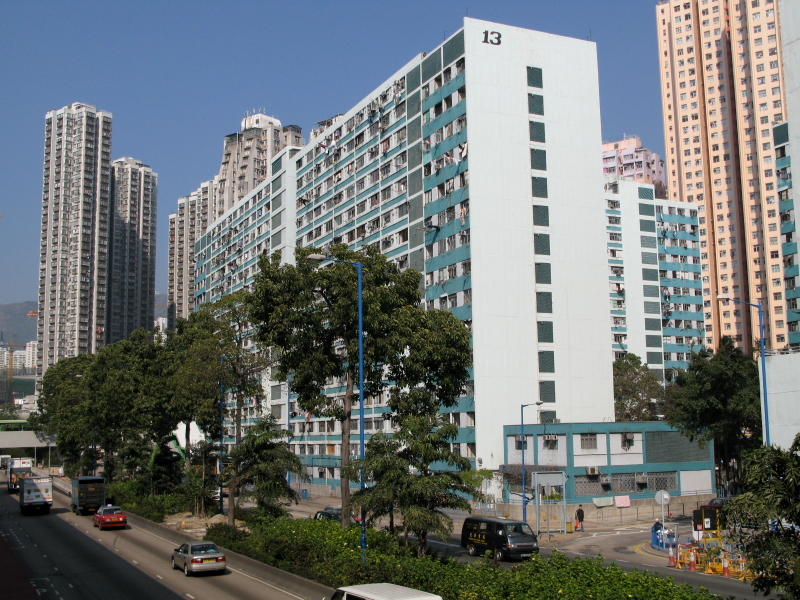
Block 13 in January 2009.

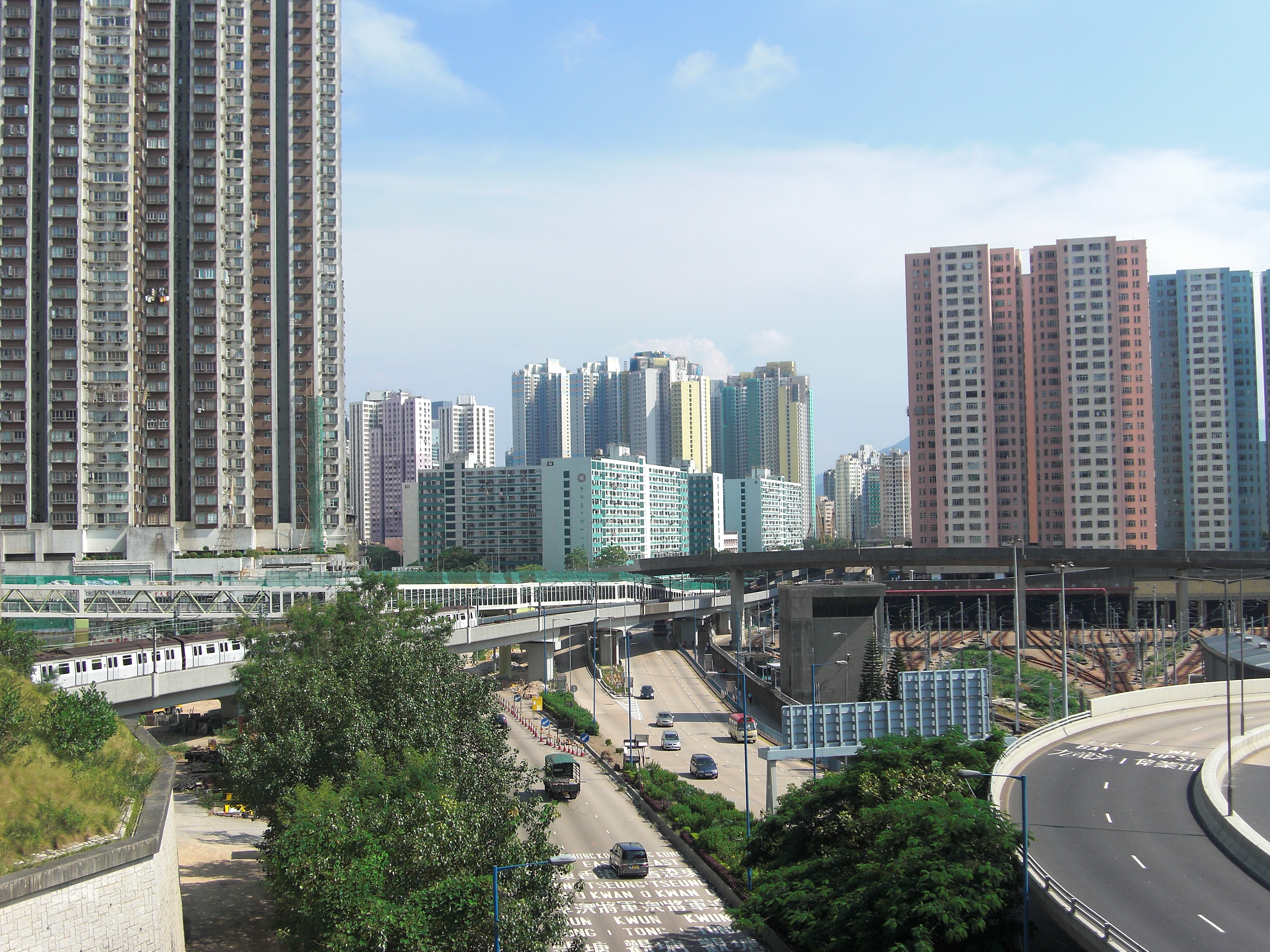
Lower Ngau Tau Kok Estate, as viewed from Jordan Valley

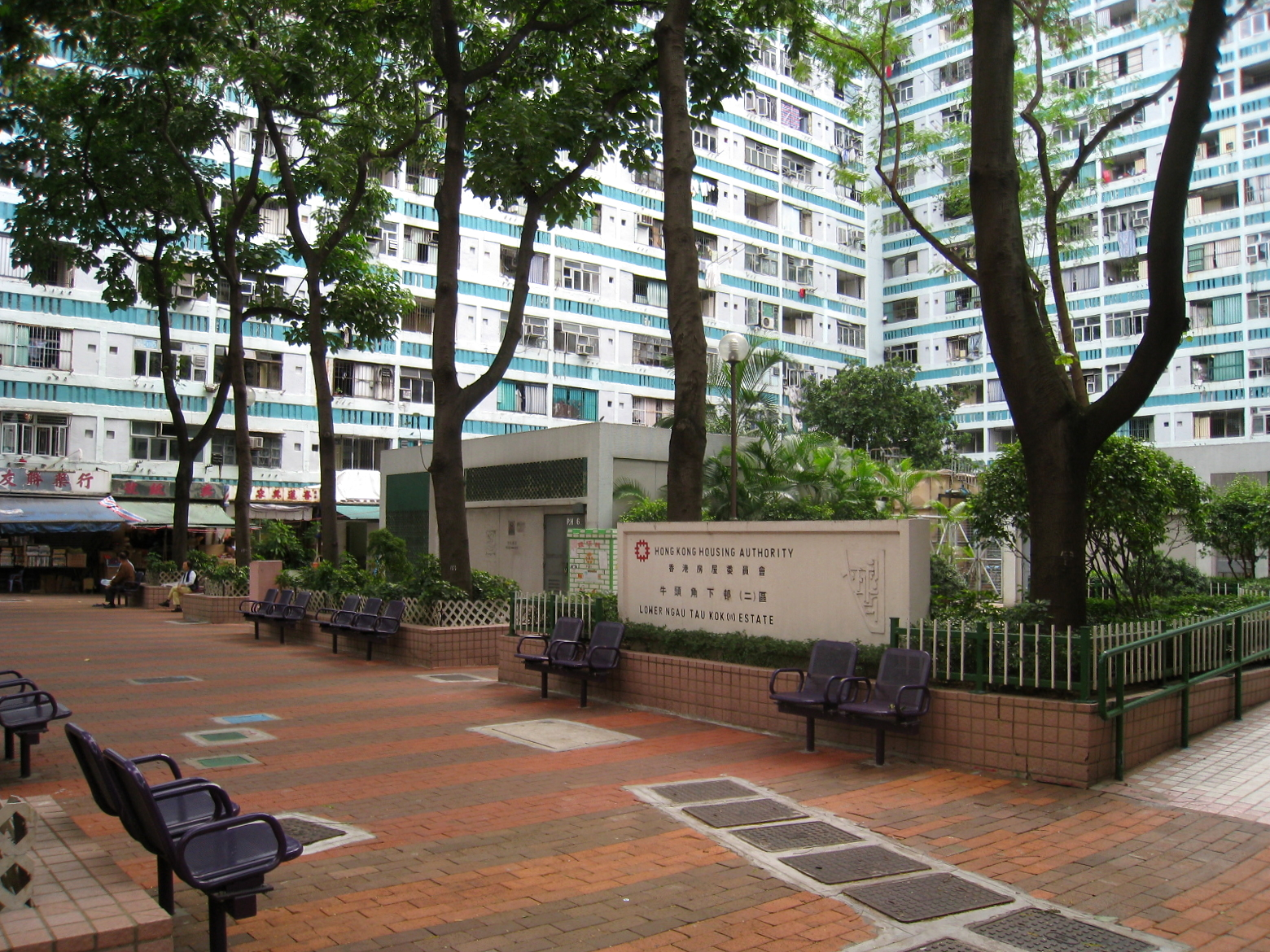
Park in Lower Ngau Tau Kok Estate.

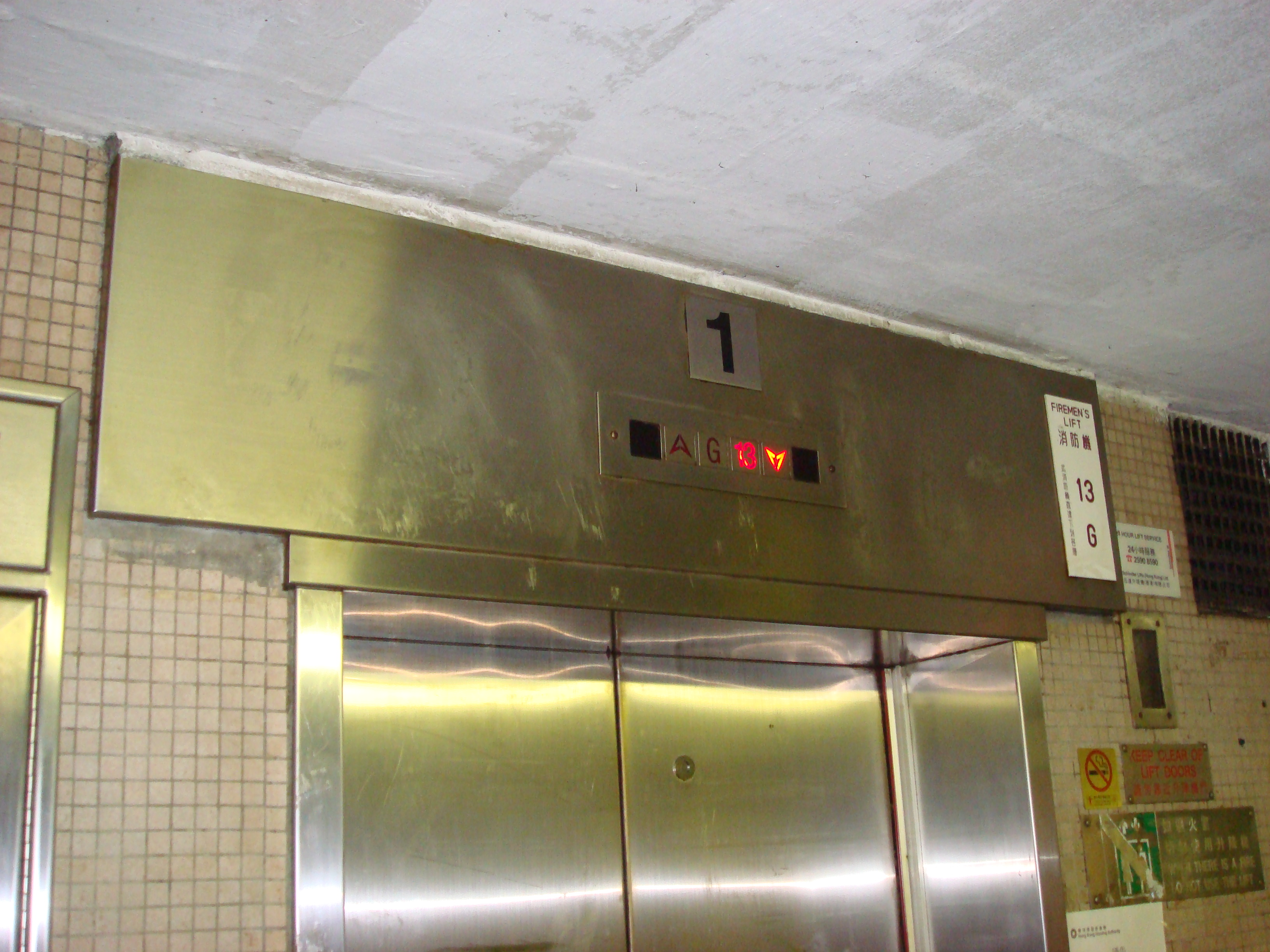
Lift between the ground floor and the 13th floor, in 2009

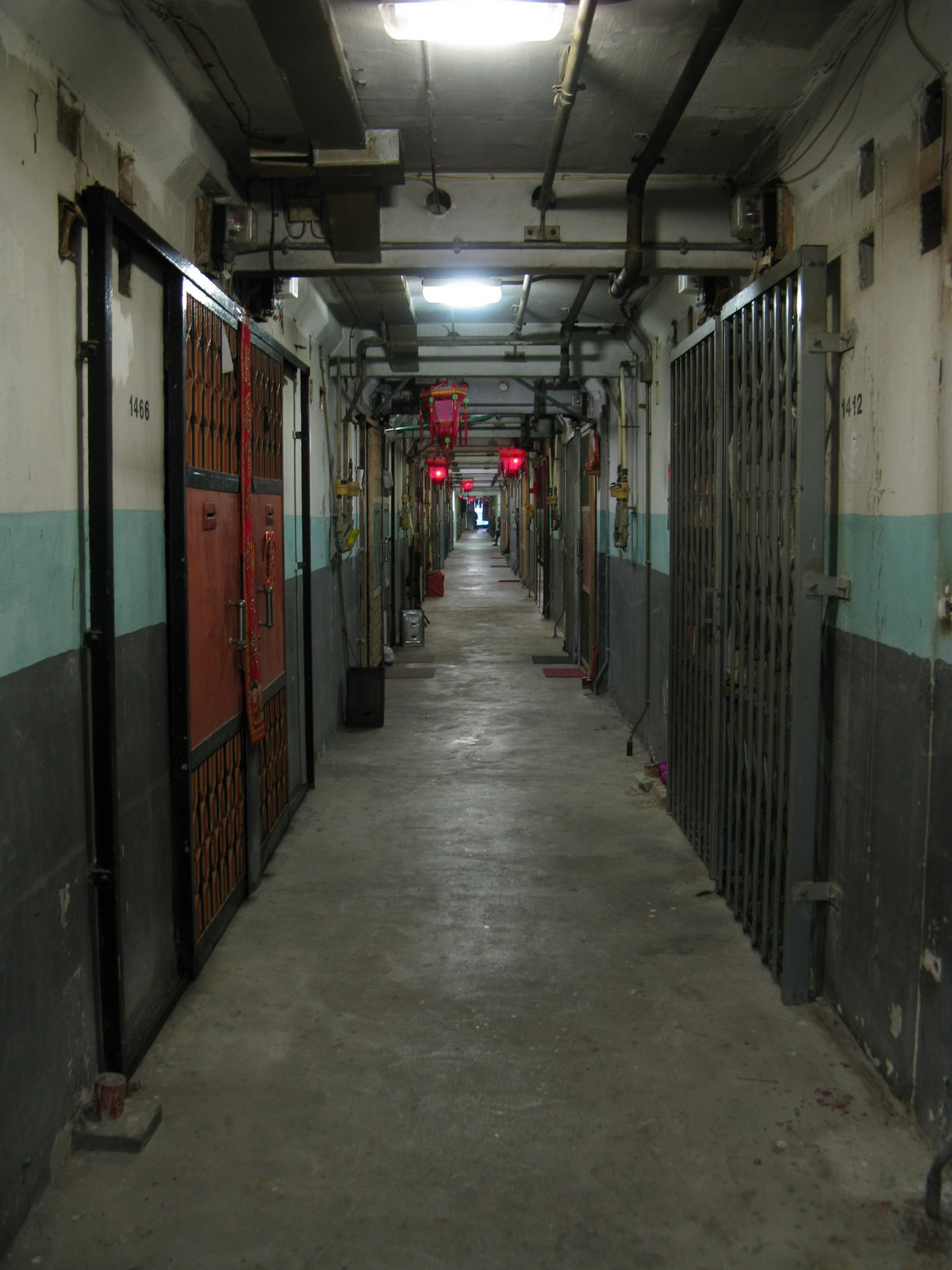
On the corridor of Block 9 in December 2008.

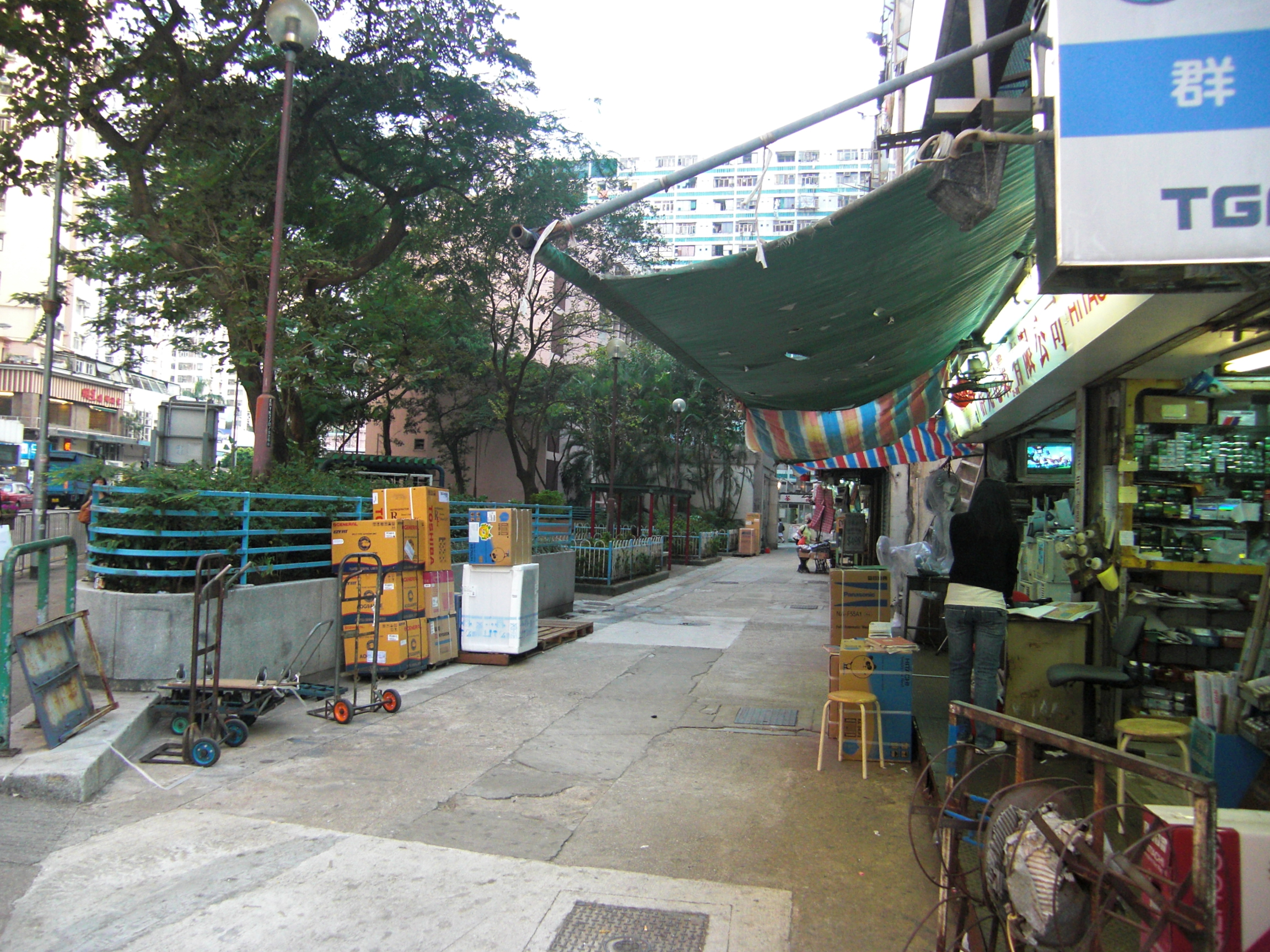
Stores on ground floor of Block 10 in November 2008.

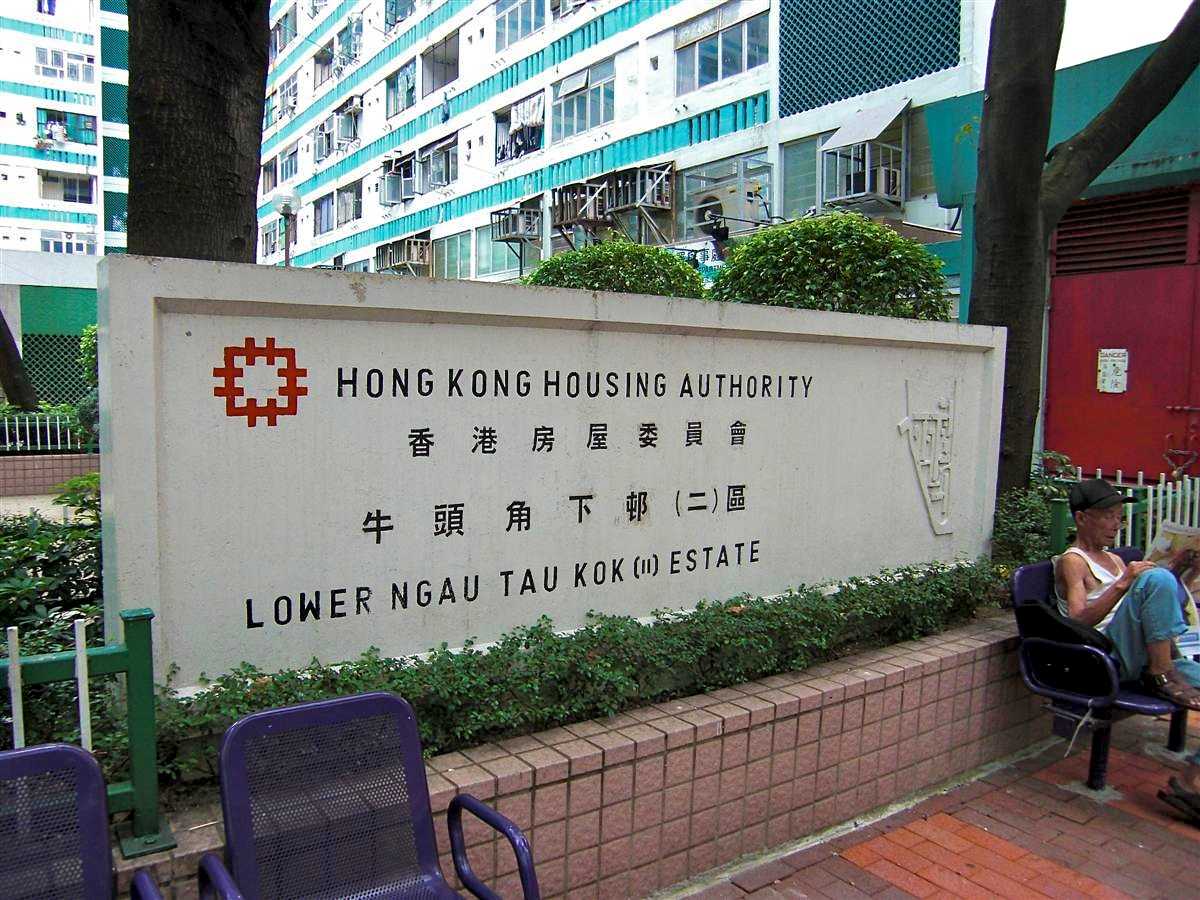
Plaque, August 2008

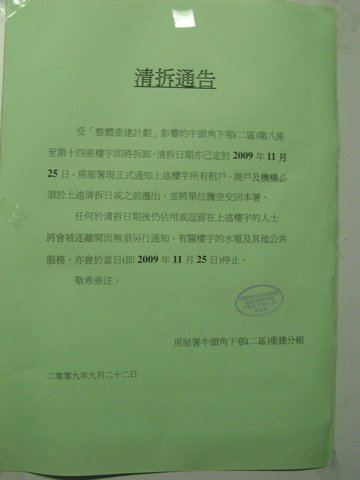
Redevelopment notice sign

== Features ==
Lower Ngau Tau Kok (II) Estate comprised 5,400 flats in seven Mark V resettlement blocks. Apartment sizes ranged from 8.2m^{2} to 39.4 m^{2}.

Lower Ngau Tau Kok Estate was among the first group of resettlement estates built with lifts. Lifts from the ground floor could reach the 8th and the 13th floors.

Lower Ngau Tau Kok Estate was also known for its dai pai dongs and cha chaan tengs, as well as the bazaars and shops surrounding each block.

== Final months ==
In the last months before its evacuation, Lower Ngau Tau Kok (II) Estate had 3,100 households and 160 commercial tenants. People living and working there complained about the nuisance created by the many people visiting the old estate before its evacuation.

== Memory ==
The Housing Authority has commissioned local photographers and video production companies to document the buildings and the life of their occupants. A cultural path will be built at the new Lower Ngau Tau Kok Estate to house the relics of the old estate.

Other than those commissioned by the Housing Authority, many local residents and tourists paid visits to the estate. Most of them took photos and videos in the estate, and had a meal in the estate's many restaurants.

== Redevelopment ==
The Lower Ngau Tau Kok Estate will be six blocks of housing estate which consists more than 30 storeys and the maximum height will be 46 storeys. They were completed in 2012.

Part of the site of the former estate will also be used for the construction of the East Kowloon Cultural Centre, slated to open in 2021.

In June 2000, the Housing authority launched the final phase of Comprehensive Planning.

=== Gallery during reconstruction ===
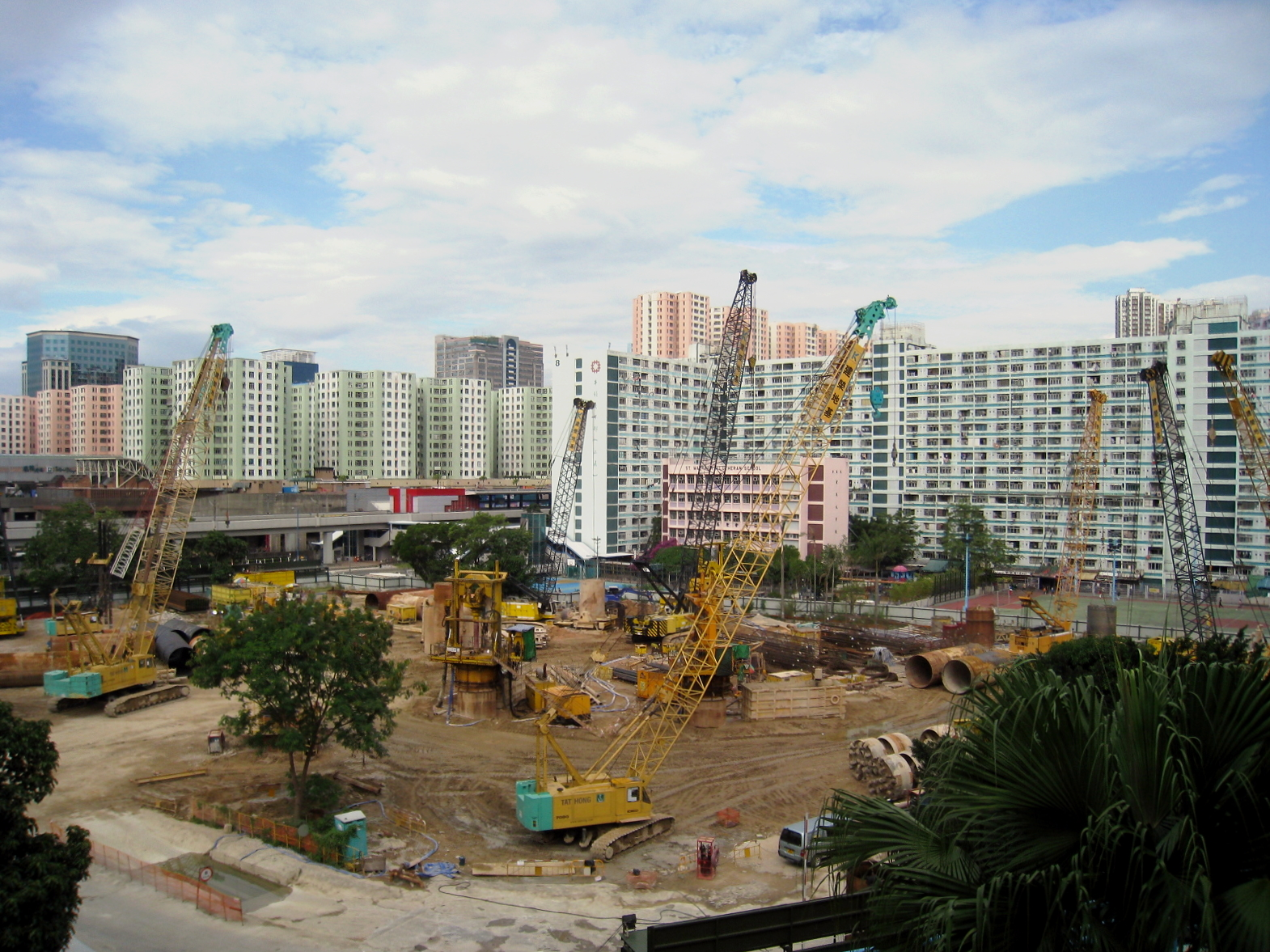
Lower Ngau Tau Kok Estate Redevelopment Site in November 2008.

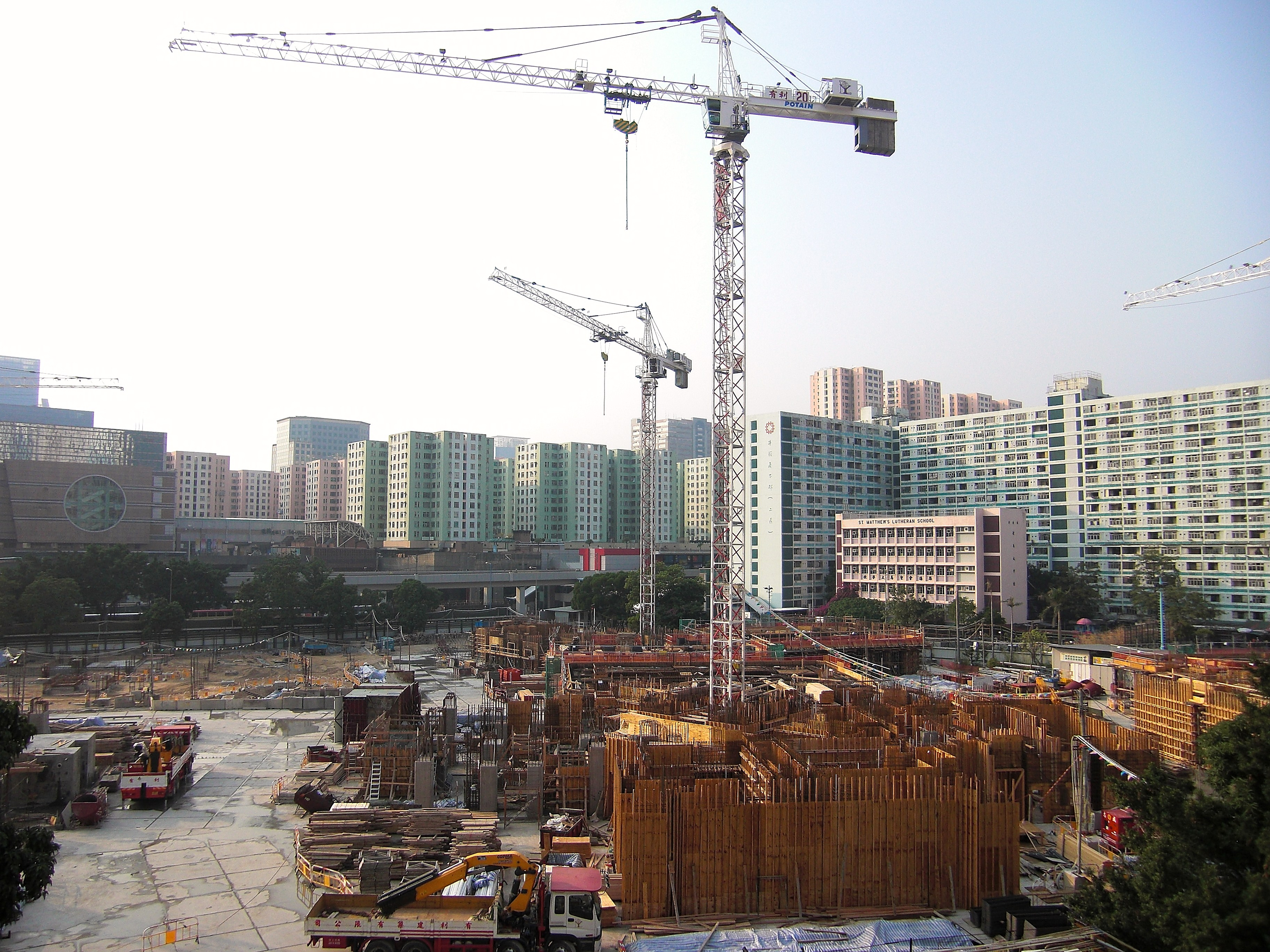
First phase in progress in December 2009.

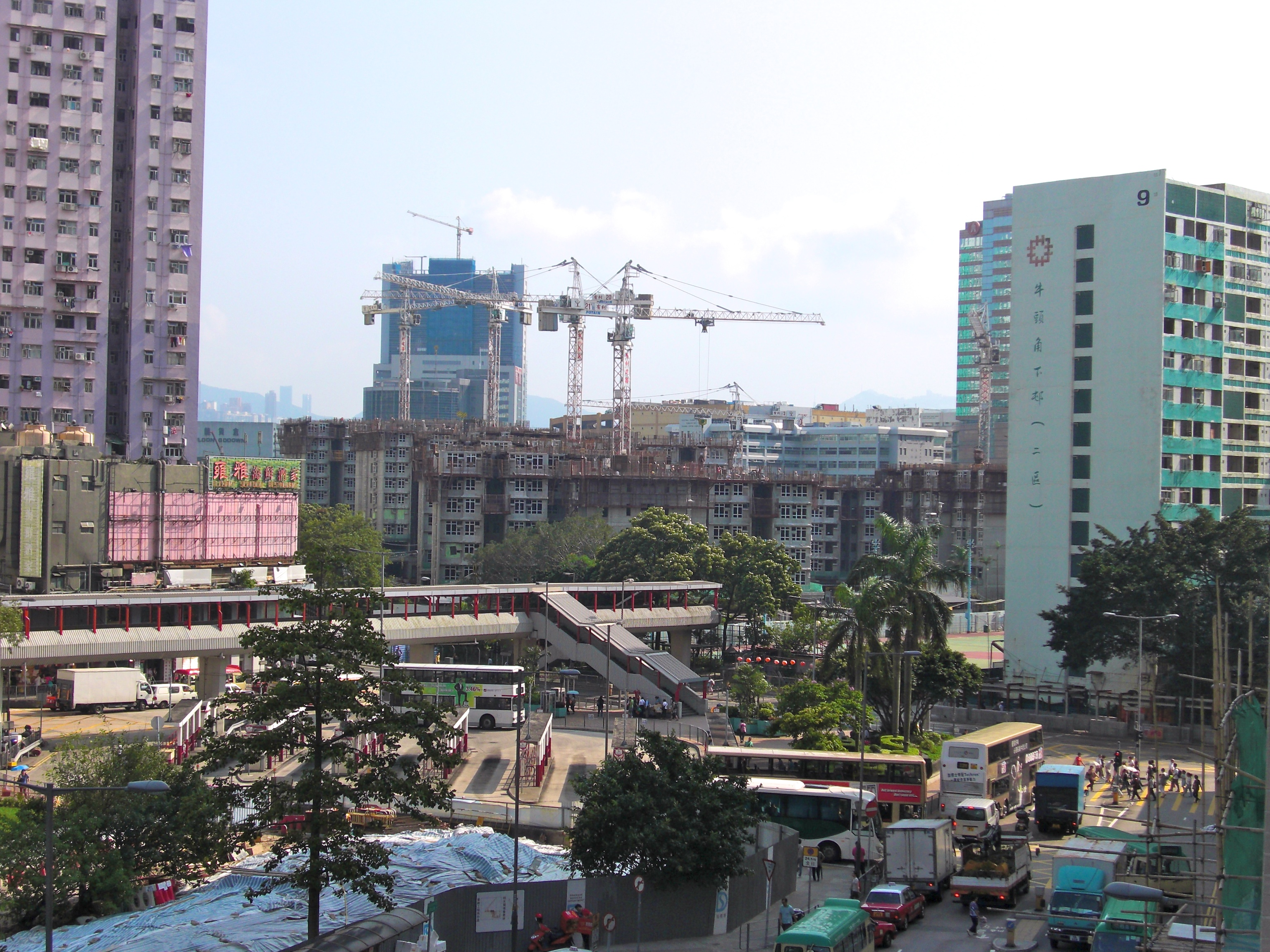
First phase in progress in June 2010, as viewed from Amoy Gardens.

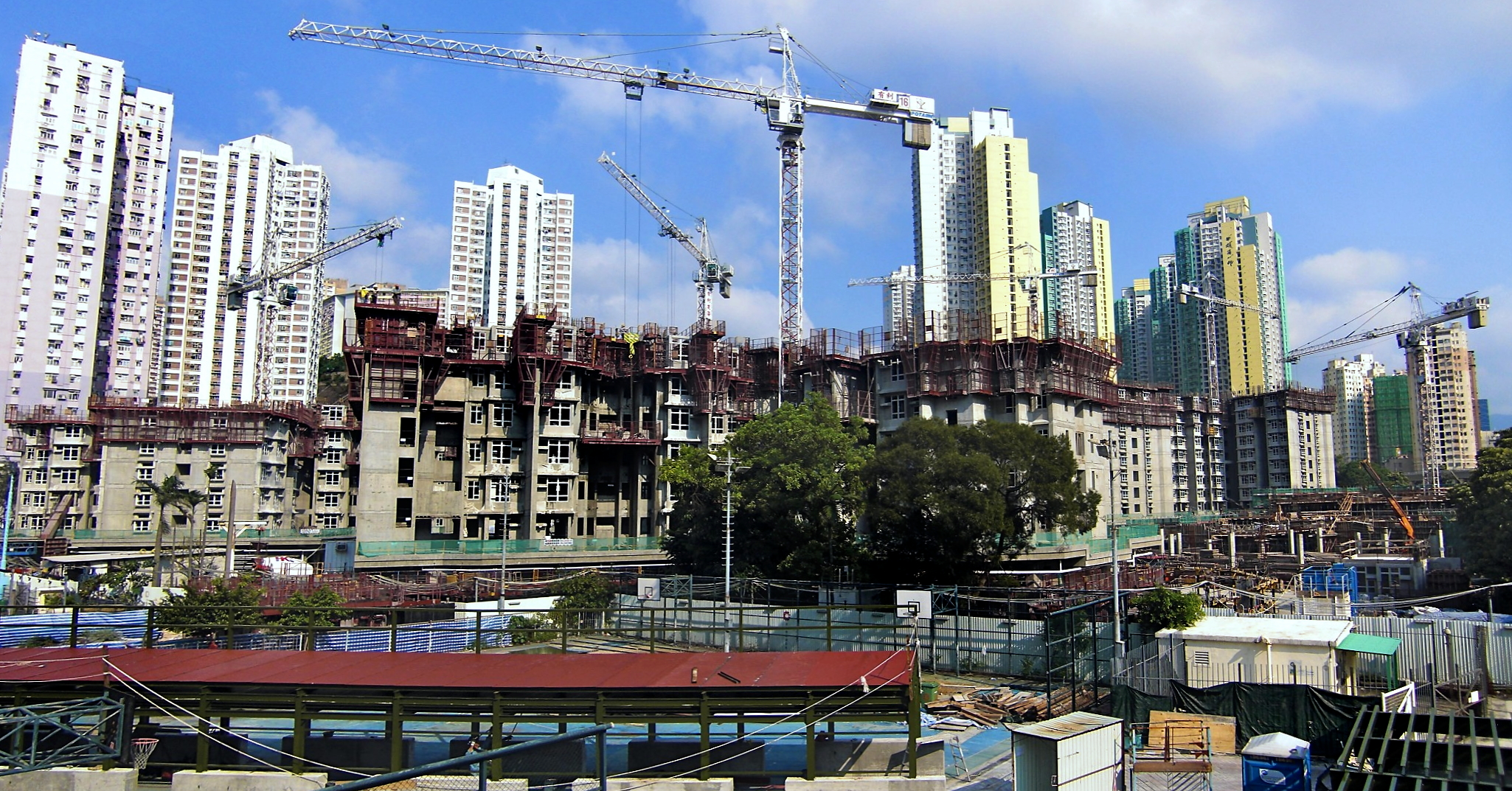
Reconstruction in progress in June 2010, as viewed from the flyover of Kwun Tong Road.

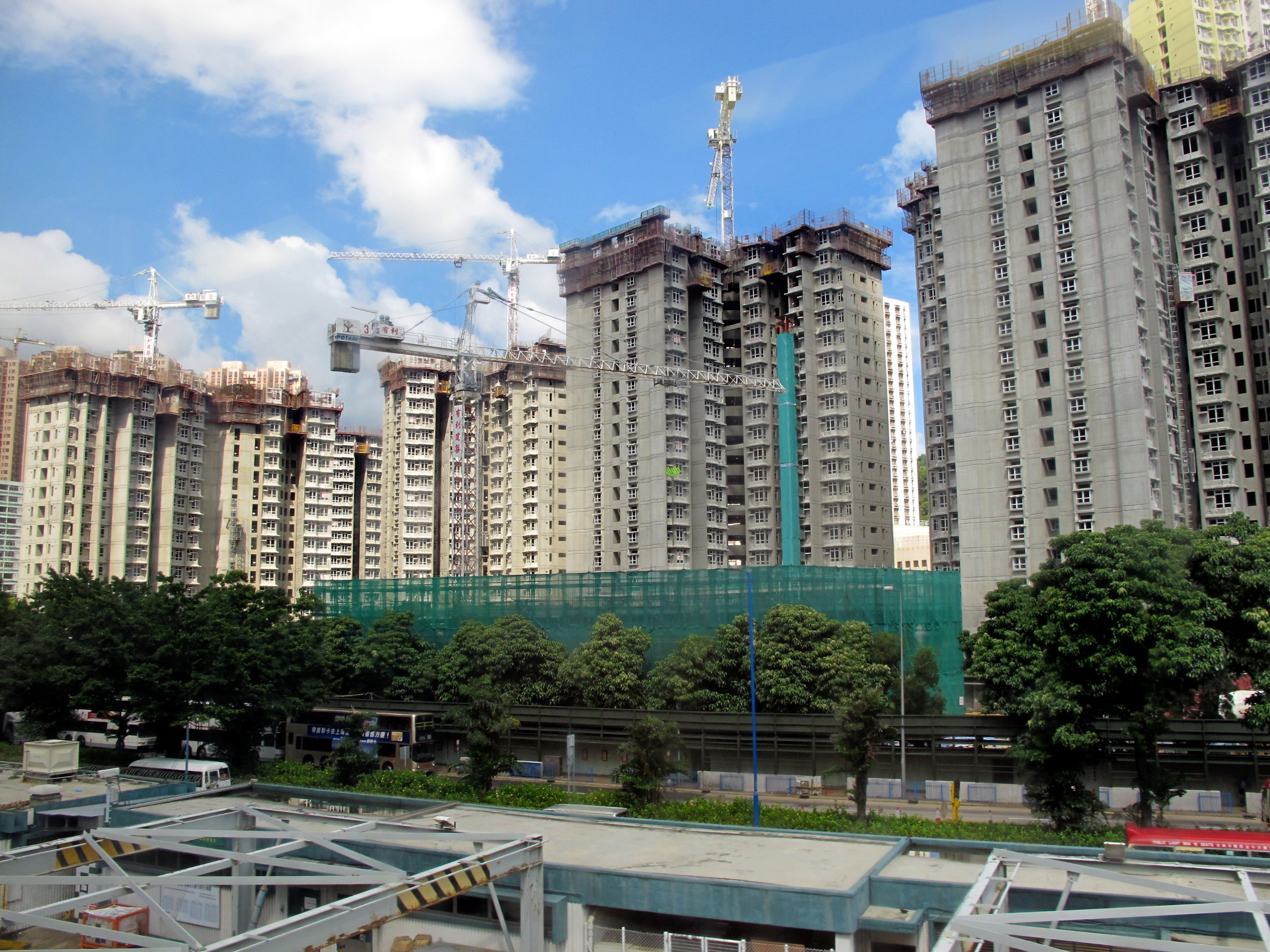
Reconstruction in progress in September 2010.

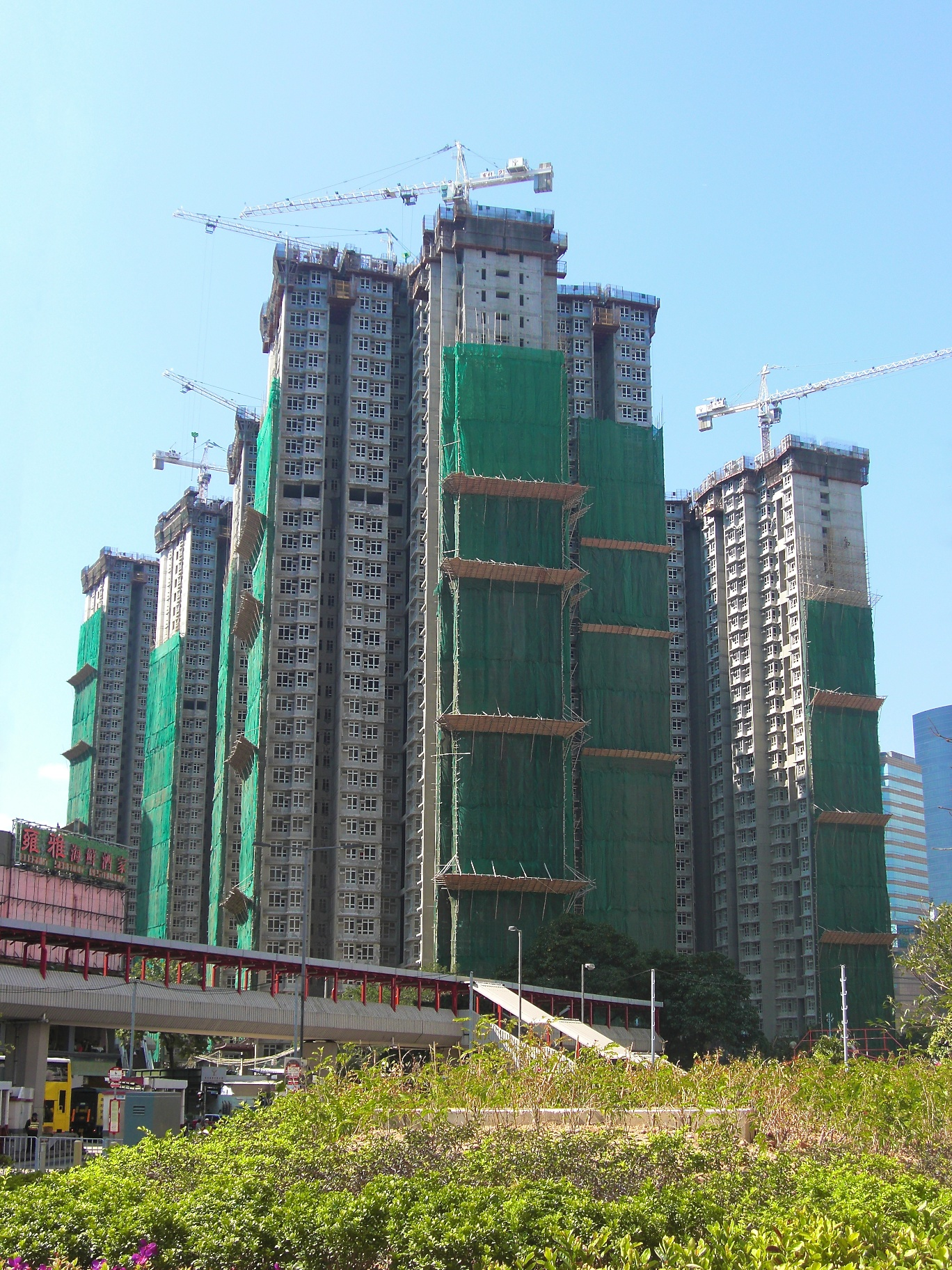
Reconstruction in progress in February 2011.

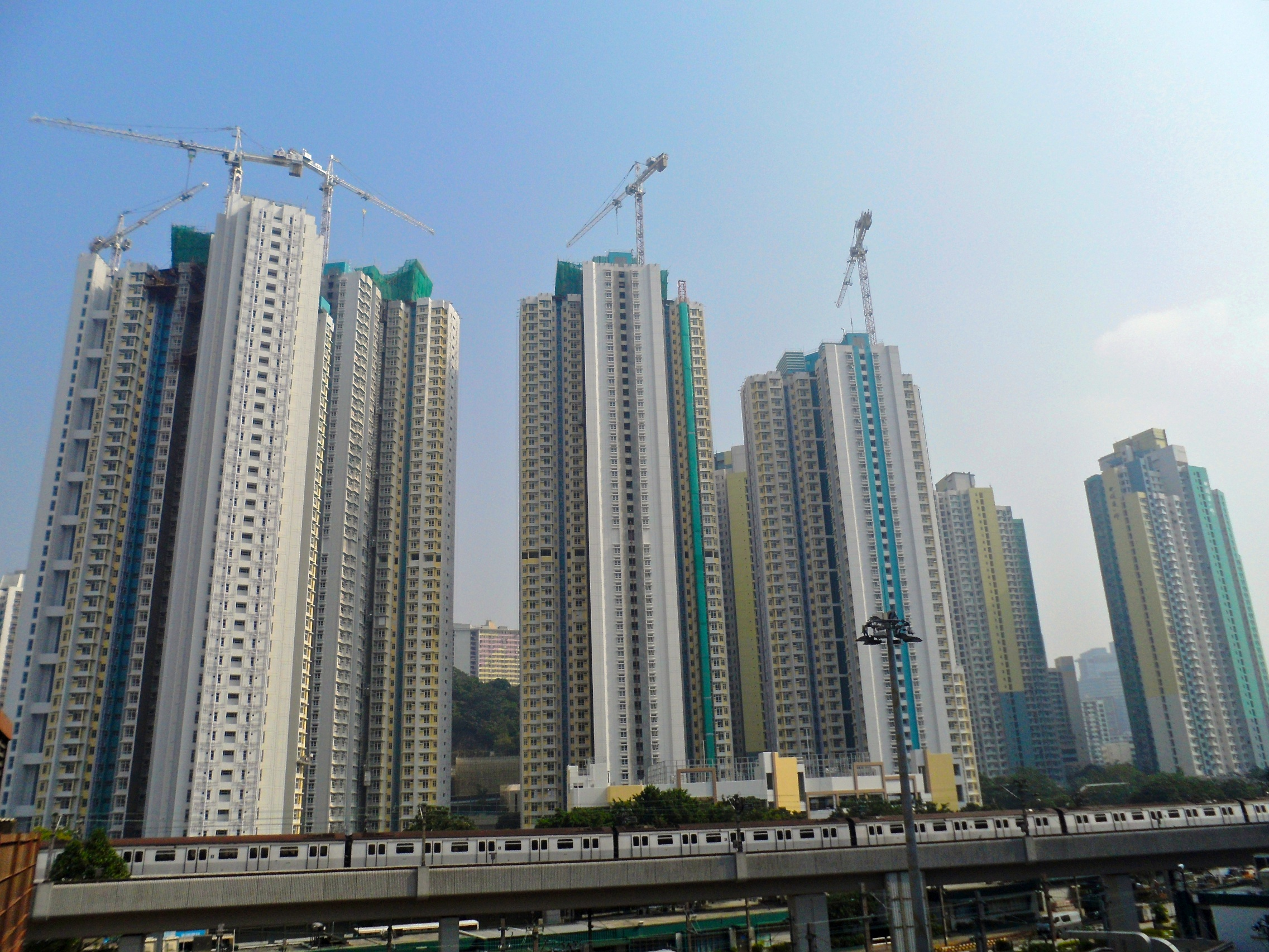
Reconstruction in progress in November 2011.

== Education ==
Lower Ngau Tau Kok Estate is in Primary One Admission (POA) School Net 46. Within the school net are multiple aided schools (operated independently but funded with government money); no government primary schools are in this net.

== Notable residents ==
Lee Wai Sze, Hong Kong track cyclist, Silver medalist in 2012 London Olympics.

== See also ==
- Upper Ngau Tau Kok Estate
- Bishop Paschang Memorial School
- Public housing estates in Ngau Tau Kok and Kowloon Bay
- Shek Kip Mei Estate, a resettlement estate demolished in 2006, except for one block, which has been listed as a "Grade I historic building"
- Public housing in Hong Kong
- List of public housing estates in Hong Kong
