= Amoy Gardens =

Housing estate in Jordan Valley, Hong Kong

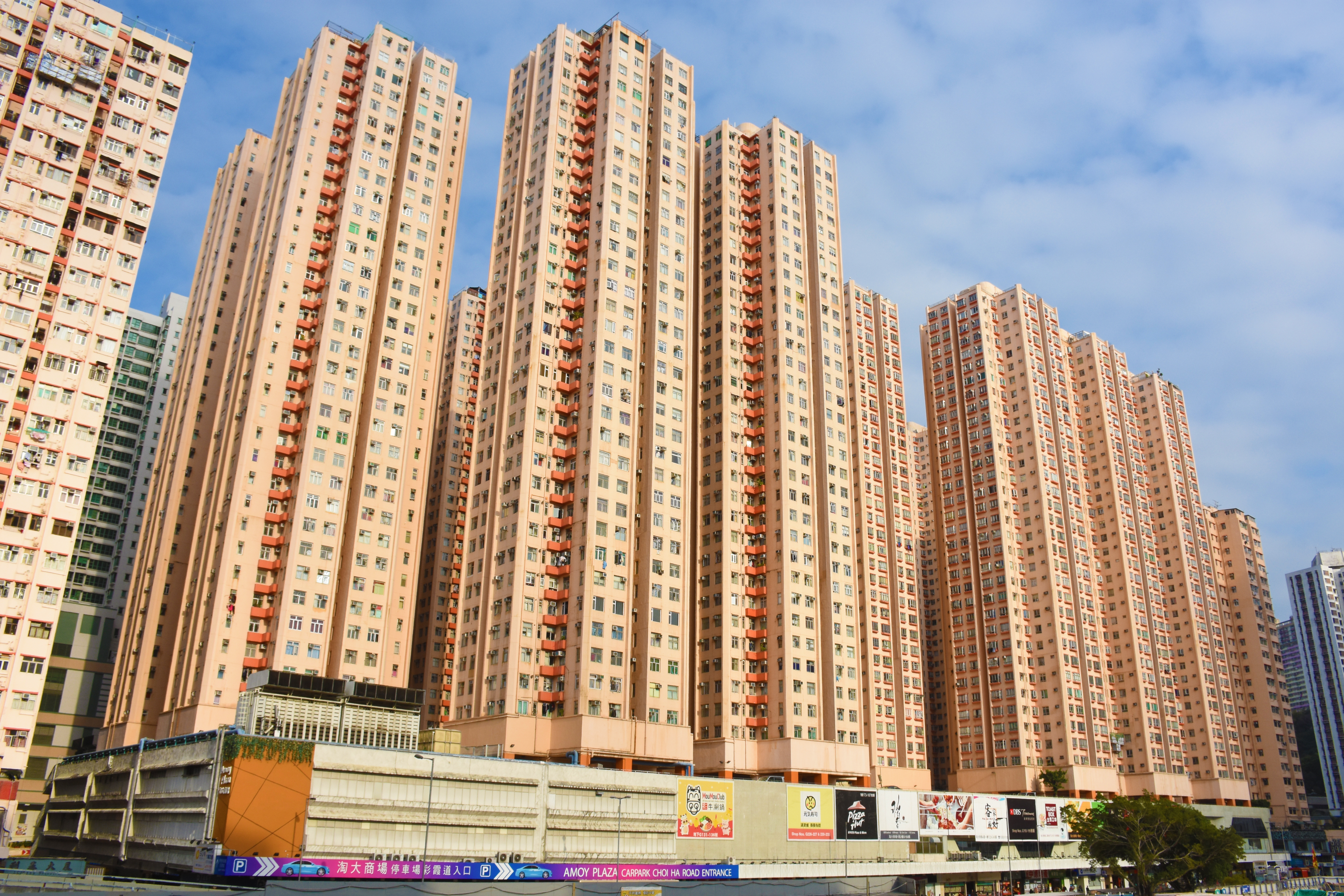
- Amoy Gardens in 2017
- Interactive map of Amoy Gardens

General information
- Location: Kowloon, Hong Kong
- Coordinates: 22.32445°N 114.21659°E
- Status: Completed
- Population: 10,721 (2016)
- No. of blocks: 19
- No. of units: 4,896

Construction
- Constructed: 1979–1987

Amoy Gardens
- Traditional Chinese: 淘大花園
- Simplified Chinese: 淘大花园
Transcriptions
Standard Mandarin
- Hanyu Pinyin: Táodà Huāyuán
Yue: Cantonese
- Jyutping: tou4 daai6 faa1 jyun4

Amoy Gardens (Chinese: 淘大花園; Jyutping: tou4 daai6 faa1 jyun4) is a private housing estate in the Jordan Valley area of Kowloon, Hong Kong, completed from 1981 to 1987. It was the most seriously affected location during the 2003 outbreak of Severe Acute Respiratory Syndrome (SARS), with over 300 people infected there.

== Features ==
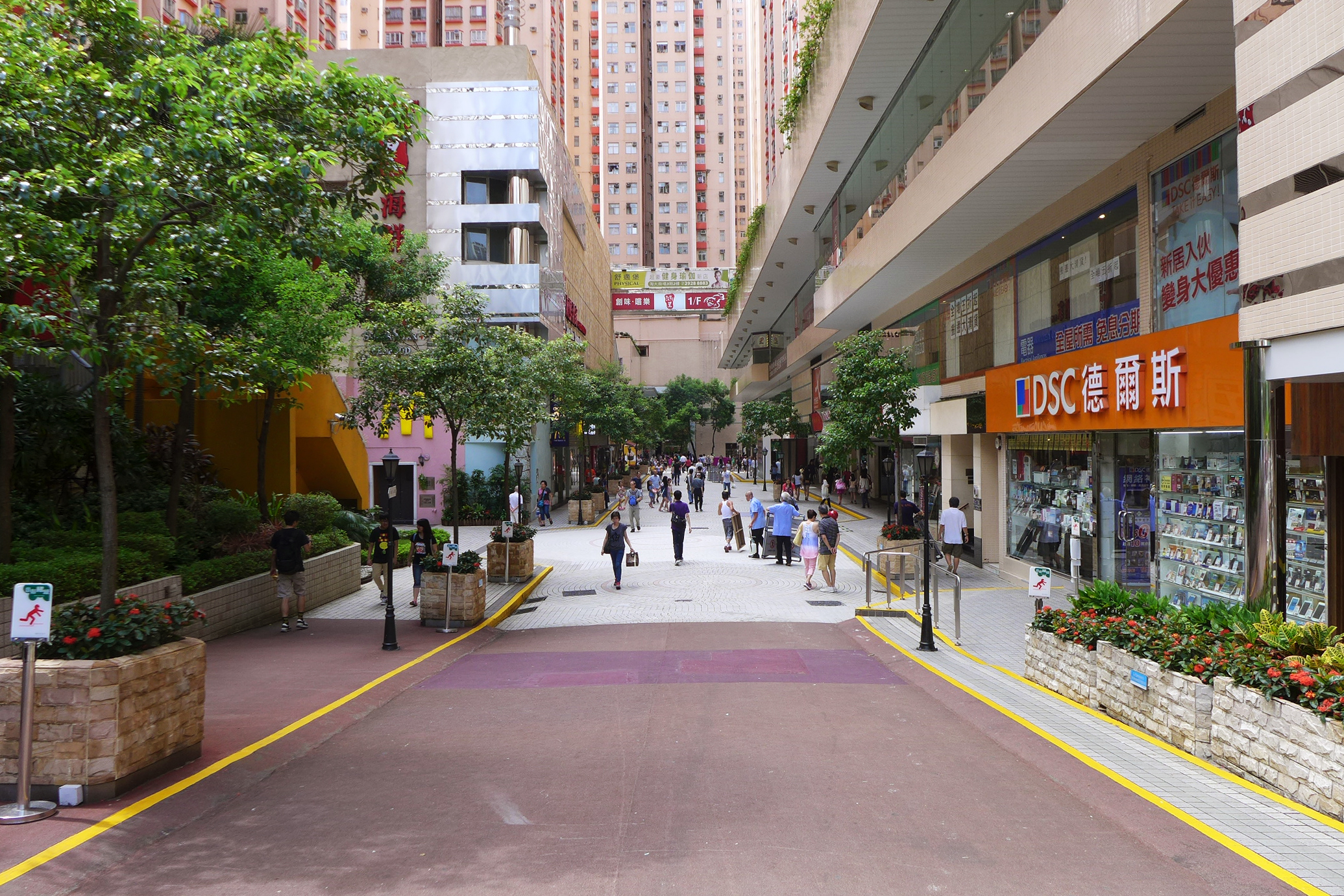
Amoy Plaza

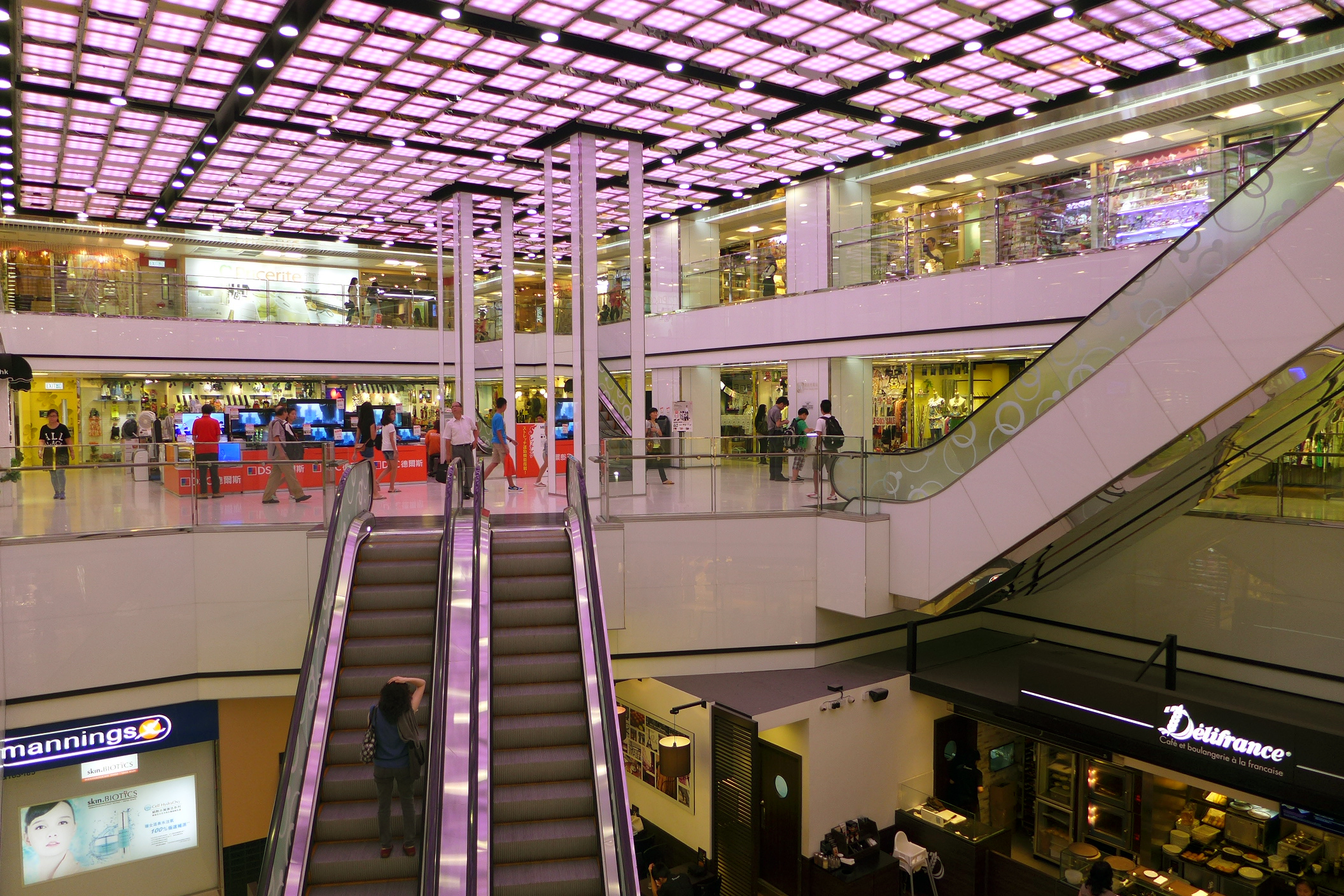
Amoy Plaza interior

Amoy Gardens comprises 19 blocks, lettered A to S, with heights ranging from 30 to 40 floors. The eight blocks A-H are 33 storeys/105 m high, and situated on a podium 14 m high, which houses a commercial centre. These eight blocks have eight flats per floor arranged in a cruciform shape. Each arm of the cruciform contains two apartments. There is a shopping arcade (Amoy Plaza) as well as a food square within the Amoy Gardens estate.

== History ==
=== Development ===
The site was purchased by Amoy Canning in the 1920s for use as a factory. Amoy put the site of approximately 222,560 square feet (20,677 m^{2}) up for auction in March 1977, intending to move their manufacturing operations elsewhere in stages. The auction failed as the reserve price was not reached. Subsequently, Hang Lung Development signed an agreement to purchase the site in April 1977 for about HK$200 million. Under the agreement, Amoy would take a share of the profits from the site's redevelopment.

The estate was built in four phases. The construction contract for the estate's first phase, comprising seven residential blocks (blocks A-G) and retail space, was awarded to Hong Kong contractor Shui On Construction on 18 October 1979. The first phase was completed in 1981, while the final phase was completed in 1987.

=== SARS outbreak ===
Toward the end of March 2003, an outbreak of SARS occurred among residents of Amoy Gardens. By 15 April 2003, there had been a total of 321 cases of SARS in the estate. A concentration of cases was recorded in block E, accounting for 41% of the cumulative total. Block C (15%), block B (13%) and block D (13%) recorded the second, third and fourth highest incidence of SARS infections. The other cases (18%) were scattered in 11 other blocks. Most of the initial 107 patients from Block E lived in flats that were vertically arranged.

All residents were subsequently moved to Lei Yue Mun and Lady MacLehose Holiday Village for isolation. In mid-2003, authorities found that the design of bathroom floor drains lacked a replenishment system to keep the water traps filled, allowing virus-laden aerosols to seep into bathrooms, exacerbated by the draw of bathroom exhaust fans. These were among the factors that contributed to the rapid spread of SARS in that complex. The estate was decontaminated and the residents were able to return. Later, the complex was retrofitted with an auxiliary floor drainage system that included fresh water interlocks to prevent regurgitation of sewer gases.

== Demographics ==
According to the 2016 by-census, Amoy Gardens had a population of 10,721. The median age was 37.7 and the majority of residents (95.6 per cent) were of Chinese ethnicity. The average household comprised 2.4 persons. The median monthly household income of all households was HK$34,000.

== Transportation ==
Amoy Gardens is served by the Kowloon Bay station of the MTR metro system. In addition, the estate is served by numerous bus routes.

== Education ==
Amoy Gardens is in Primary One Admission (POA) School Net 46. Within the school net are multiple aided schools (operated independently but funded with government money); no government primary schools are in this net.

== See also ==
- East Kowloon Cultural Centre – located opposite Amoy Gardens
- List of buildings and structures in Hong Kong
- Lower Ngau Tau Kok (II) Estate
