= Clean Air Network =

Hong Kong non-governmental organisation

- Formation: July 2009
- Type: NGO
- Location: Hong Kong
- Website: www.hongkongcan.org

Clean Air Network (CAN, traditional Chinese: 健康空氣行動; simplified Chinese: 健康空气行动) is an independent non-governmental organisation exclusively focused on the issue of air pollution in Hong Kong. CAN aims to educate the public about the health impacts of air pollution and to mobilise public support for cleaner air in Hong Kong.

== History ==
CAN was established in July 2009, following a Civic Exchange conference focused on the state of Hong Kong's air pollution in January of the same year.

In 2017, CAN focused primarily on tackling local roadside air pollution, along with emissions from marine vessels, power plants and regional sources. In recent years, CAN focuses to become the top environmental educational partner, and urges for accelerate Hong Kong's transition of franchised bus, public light bus and heavy–duty goods vehicles to zero–emission modes.

== Work ==
=== Anti-Idling Bill ===
The Anti-idling Ordinance has been a significant milestone in the regulation of Hong Kong's road side emissions. The bill, first brought to the public attention in June 2010, was intended to prevent motorists from keeping their engines on while not in motion. The anti-idling ban now offers a three-minute grace period every hour a vehicle is running and various other exemptions.

In June 2010, during the Legislative Council's hearing of public statements for and against the anti-idling bill, the organisation secured the appearance of two Hong Kong medical associations, the Hong Kong Society of Pediatrics and the Hong Kong Asthma Society, represented by Dr. Aaron Yu Chak-man and Dr. Alfred Tam Yat-cheung, respectively. Both doctors defended the bill and fielded questions from groups against the anti-idling ordinance. CAN also helped to bring students from Chinese International School, who implored lawmakers to protect their health instead of subordinating society's interests to narrow constituencies’ demands. CAN also backed the Secretary of the Environment, Edward Yau by accompanying him during his consultation with Hong Kong's transportation industry workers.

=== Environmental Impact Assessment ===
The Clean Air Network has worked towards encouraging the Panel of Environmental Affairs to review its environmental impact assessment Ordinance and to make amendments so that public health is considered during the assessment of new infrastructure projects. CAN wrote a letter to LegCo outlining the possible amendments to the Technical Memorandum. These changes suggested that the EIA should describe how the environment and community might be affected by the above change and what possible mitigation measures the party could use.

=== Social Media and Technology ===
Of particular significance is a public service announcement CAN released. The video stars popular celebrities Daniel Wu, Ana R., Simon Yin and Cara G, and is shot in the style of a 1980s-style infomercial. The PSA is a fake advertisement about canned oxygen brand and takes a humorous, satirical approach in order to provoke viewers to imagine pollution so bad that one has to purchase healthy air from a can in order to perform even everyday functions.

=== Air Quality Objectives ===
CAN has pressured the government to update and enforce its Air Quality Objectives on many instances. In January 2011, CAN, Friends of the Earth and other green groups filed an ombudsman complaint collectively in order to protest the government's failure to fulfill their promise to review and revise the Air Quality Objectives. The organisations requested that the government set a timetable to meet the objectives and explain to the public whether any progress has been made. Although following the complaint the government was not found guilty of maladministration, the ordeal was able to garner public attention towards the government's lack of action.

=== Community Outreach ===
In the spring of 2011, CAN joined up with Sotheby's and 40 international artists to hold a Clean Air Auction, the first of its kind and scale in Asia. Environmentally-themed artwork was on display in IFC's oval atrium in March and subsequently auctioned in April at Sotheby's Hong Kong Contemporary Asian Art Spring Auction at the Hong Kong Convention and Exhibition Center. The auction ended with the sale of 42 lots and raised a total of $2.2 million.

Additionally, CAN holds an annual event called the Airmazing Race, a scavenger hunt intended to raise awareness towards air pollution through the completion of various tasks.

== Activities ==
On 25 March 2019, CAN held a press conference in the Legislative Council building with other environmental group members of the Air Quality Concern Group and Legislative Council members, included Eddie Chu, Dennis Kwok, Jeffrey Tam, Kenneth Leung, Kwok Ka-ki, Tanya Chan and Ted Hui. In the press conference, the concern groups and the Legislative Councillors opposed the Government's proposal to significantly relax the restriction on the number of days on which exceeding the concentration limit of fine suspended particulates would be allowed, from nine days to 35 days per year, which would jeopardise public health. The groups urged the Government to withdraw the proposal immediately.

In 2019, CAN and other environmental groups in the "Air Quality Concern Group" commissioned the Hong Kong Public Opinion Research Institute to conduct a survey on the air quality objectives review. The said groups released the findings in a press conference on 1 August 2019 and criticised the Environmental Protection Department for going against public opinion when revising the air quality objectives. Those attending the press conference included Friends of the Earth (HK), Greenpeace, Legislative Councillor Kwok Ka-ki, and writer in environmental issue James Edward Ockenden.

On 13 August 2019, following the police's use of tear gas in the Kwai Fong MTR Station on 11 August, Ming Pao invited CAN to measure the concentration of fine suspended particulates in the station. Loong Tsz Wai, Senior Community Relations Manager at CAN, pointed out that although the measurement did not show a relationship between the use of tear gas and the concentration of the particulates, it showed the station was not well ventilated. The station was partly enclosed; for this reason the tear gas was not easily dispersed and fell on the ground when it cooled down and turned into powder. Loong expressed concerns on the decision of reopen the MTR station was made without adequate consideration.

On 22 August 2019, CAN released the findings of a survey titled "The Impact of Tear Gas on Hong Kong People's Health".

On 18 November 2019, CAN's Loong Tse Wai published an article titled "Does Tear Gas Affect Air Quality?" in the Hong Kong Economic Journal. He pointed out that the Government had underestimated the impact of tear gas towards air quality and humans. Loong, an alumnus of CUHK, in the article condemned on the police's use of tear gas on campus without restraint.

On 30 July 2020, Ming Pao Weekly published an article titled "Field Study: How Many Tear Gas Canisters We Can Bear in a Street". In the article, CAN's Loong Tsz Wai pointed out that the discussion should not be focussed on the spacious of the area but the impact of tear gas on residents. Loong said the reason for using tear gas in an open area was to reduce the impact on residents, passers-by and restaurants nearby, using tear gas in an area with a high density of buildings or population was unreasonable.

In January 2020, CAN held press conference to announce 2019 Annual Air Quality Review with key findings included level of ozone in Hong Kong reached 20 years record high. According to Ming Pao Daily News report, CAN analyzed 2019 air quality data from the Hong Kong Environmental Protection Department (EPD) and noted the level of PM2.5 and NO_{2} has shown a decreasing trend compared to 5 years previously, but level of ozone has shown an unstoppable increase in 2019 to reach the highest level (54 μg/m^{3}) since 1998. CAN mentioned the government seems not developing an effective strategy for combating the skyrocketing level of ozone, should investigate the reason why the level of ozone in Hong Kong and the surrounding region has been skyrocketed in recent years.

CAN, in April 2021, worked with community institutions launched "Citizen Clean Air Plan" (CAP 2013) with the aim to reconcile some of the disconnections observed in the past administrations (including disconnections in policymaking and science) by changing the system. The CAP2013 with reviews and recommendations and this was supported by various organization included he Hong Kong Medical Association, Hong Kong Thoracic Society, Hong Kong Lung Foundation, the CHEST Delegation Hong Kong and Macau Limited, Hong Kong Society of Paediatric Respirology and Allergy. Eight district councils (Central and Western, Eastern, Wan Chai, Kwun Tong, Wong Tai Sin, Sham Shui Po, Yau Tsim Mong, and Tuen Mun) has passed a resolution in support for a citizen clean air plan.

On 4 February 2023, CAN with James Edward Ockenden held a protest against the illegal operation of a concrete plant in Yau Tong. The concrete plant operating by China Concrete Company, and its application for a licence renewal of the plant was denied by the Environmental Protection Department (EPD) in January 2022. The High Court also rejected a legal bid from the company to challenge the government's decision last month. Despite this company was refused a licence renewal, the concrete plant on Yau Tong continued to operate.

On 6 February 2023, CAN and several other environmental activists groups criticized the government's handling of Lantau Tomorrow project.
