= Amoy Food =

Hong Kong food company

Amoy Food Limited
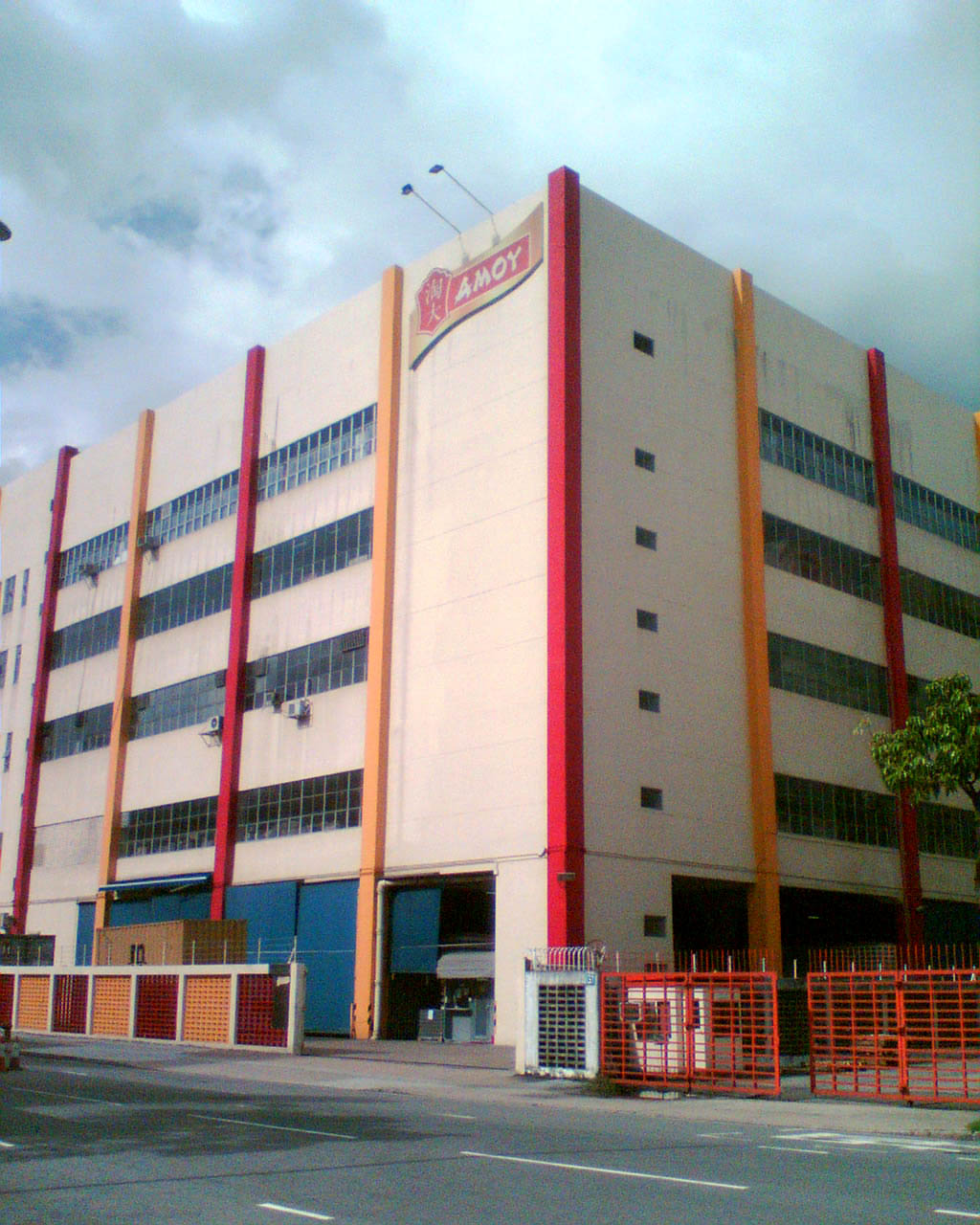
- An Amoy plant, Tai Po Industrial Estate, Hong Kong
- Native name: 淘化大同食品有限公司
- Company type: Subsidiary
- Industry: Food processing, Food industry
- Founded: 1908; 118 years ago
- Founder: 陳天恩 楊格非
- Headquarters: 11-15 Dai Fu Street, Tai Po Industrial Estate, Tai Po, New Territories
- Products: Soy sauce, Frozen foods
- Parent: CITIC Group

Chinese name
- Traditional Chinese: 淘化大同
Transcriptions
Yue: Cantonese
- Yale Romanization: Tòuh fa daaih tùhng
- Jyutping: Tou4 fa3 daai6 tung4
Southern Min
- Hokkien POJ: Tô-hòa Tāi-tông
- Website: amoy.com

Amoy Food Limited is a manufacturer of cooking sauces and condiments in Hong Kong. Its products, which now include foodstuffs such as frozen foods and instant foods for heating in a microwave oven, are sold around the world. It was acquired in 2018 by CITIC Capital, a subsidiary of the CITIC Group.

Its former factory site in Ngau Tau Kok was sold in the 1970s and has since been turned into an apartment complex called the Amoy Gardens.

== Etymology ==
Amoy (廈門) is an English romanisation of the Min Nan pronunciation of the name of the city in Fujian province, China known in Mandarin as Xiamen.

== History ==
In 1908, Tao Fa, the predecessor of the company, was founded in Xiamen for producing soy sauce and soy milk. In 1928, Amoy was set up in Hong Kong.

In a 1947 advertisement, the company was named as Amoy Canning Corporation, Ltd. (Chinese: 香港淘化大同公司; Cantonese Yale: Hēunggóng Tòufa Daaihtùng Gūngsī) with factory in Ngau Tau Kok and head office at Bonham Strand in Sheung Wan.

In 1977, Sime Darby group acquired 50% of Amoy Canning.

In 1980, Hang Lung Development acquired 63% of Amoy Canning Corp. (HK) Ltd

In 1983, fifty percent of Amoy Food was acquired by Pillsbury.

In 1987, a manufacturing plant was set up in Tai Po Industrial Estate in Tai Po.

In 1988, it was reported to be the largest soy sauce maker in the area, producing 6,000 tonnes a year.

In 1991, Amoy became wholly owned by the French dairy products company Danone.

On 12 January 2006, Danone sold the company to Ajinomoto of Japan.

In 2013, Amoy frozen food's factory in China was moved to Tai Po Industrial Estate in Hong Kong.

In 2018, Ajinomoto sold the company to CITIC Group of China.

In Europe, Amoy products are distributed by Kraft Heinz.

== See also ==
- Manufacturing in Hong Kong
- List of companies of Hong Kong
