= East Kowloon Cultural Centre =

Performance venue in Ngau Tau Kok, Hong Kong

Coordinates: 22.3242°N 114.2149°E

East Kowloon Cultural Centre 東九文化中心
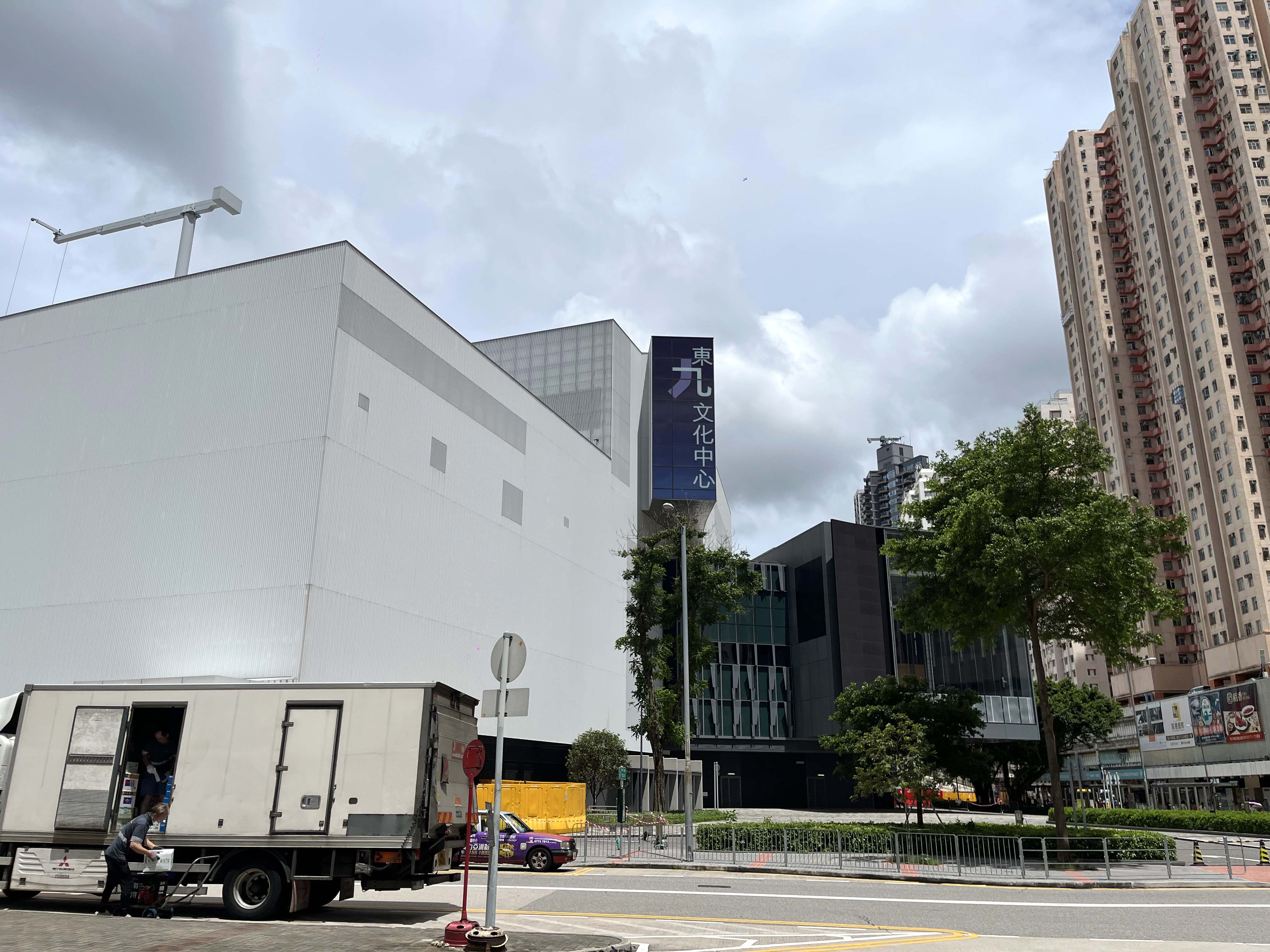
- Interactive map of East Kowloon Cultural Centre 東九文化中心
- Type: Cultural complex
- Public transit: Kowloon Bay station

Construction
- Groundbreaking: 2016
- Opened: October 2024
- Cost: HK$4.1 billion
- Architect: Architectural Services Department
- General contractor: Leighton Contractors

East Kowloon Cultural Centre
- Traditional Chinese: 東九文化中心
- Simplified Chinese: 东九文化中心
Transcriptions
Standard Mandarin
- Hanyu Pinyin: Dōng Jiǔ wénhuà Zhōngxīn
Yue: Cantonese
- Jyutping: dung1 gau2 man4 faa3 zung1 sam1

The East Kowloon Cultural Centre is an arts complex in Jordan Valley, Kowloon, Hong Kong. It is be located on part of the former site of Lower Ngau Tau Kok Estate, directly across Kwun Tong Road from Kowloon Bay station. It was built on a 2.16-hectare (5.3-acre) site at an estimated cost of $4.1 billion and opened in October 2024.

The centre houses five performance halls including a 1,200-seat multi-purpose hall and a 550-seat theatre, plus three smaller venues. It was designed by Rocco Yim and the Architectural Services Department.

== History ==
The Urban Council explored the provision of a regional cultural centre in East Kowloon as early as the mid-1980s. A site was chosen in Sai Tso Wan immediately south of the Kwun Tong Magistracy. The Kwun Tong District Board strongly advocated a 1000-seat auditorium but the Council doubted the prospective utilisation rate of such a facility. Instead, the Kwun Tong Bypass and an electric substation were built on the site.

Alongside new public housing, a civic centre was also included in the redevelopment plans for the former Lower Ngau Tau Kok Estate. This was endorsed by Kwun Tong District Council in November 2006.

Construction commenced in 2016, and the centre opened in October 2024. The contractor is Leighton Contractors (Asia) Limited.

== Facilities ==
- auditorium (1,200 seats)
- theatre (550 seats)
- three studios for music, dance and drama (120-250 seats each)
- large rehearsal room
- two small rehearsal rooms
