= Yau Chui (constituency) =

Hong Kong constituency

- 油翠
- Elected constituency for the Kwun Tong District Council
- Boundary of Yau Chui in Kwun Tong District
- District: Kwun Tong
- Legislative Council constituency: Kowloon East
- Population: 17,969 (2019)
- Electorate: 8,504 (2019)

Current constituency
- Created: 2011
- Number of members: One
- Member: Sunny Pong Chi-sang (FPHE)

Yau Cheung (Chinese: 油翠), previously Chui Cheung is one of the 40 constituencies in the Kwun Tong District of Hong Kong which was created in 2011.

Covering Yau Chui Court, part of Yau Lai Estate, Yau Mei Court and Yau Tong Centre in Yau Tong, the constituency has an estimated population of 17,969.

== Councillors represented ==
Election	Member	Party
2011	Yvonne Tse Suk-chun	Independent
2019	Sunny Pong Chi-sang	FPHE

== Election results ==
=== 2010s ===
Kwun Tong District Council Election, 2019: Yau Chui
Party	Candidate	Votes	%	±%
FPHE	Sunny Pong Chi-sang	2,857	46.82	
Nonpartisan	Aaron Chung Sui-kwan	2,572	42.15	
Nonpartisan	Chan Fu-king	605	9.91	
Nonpartisan	Leung Ka-shing	68	1.11	
Majority		285	4.67	
Turnout		6,120	71.97	
FPHE gain from Independent		Swing		
