= Domain (Hong Kong shopping centre) =

Shopping centre in Yau Tong, Hong Kong

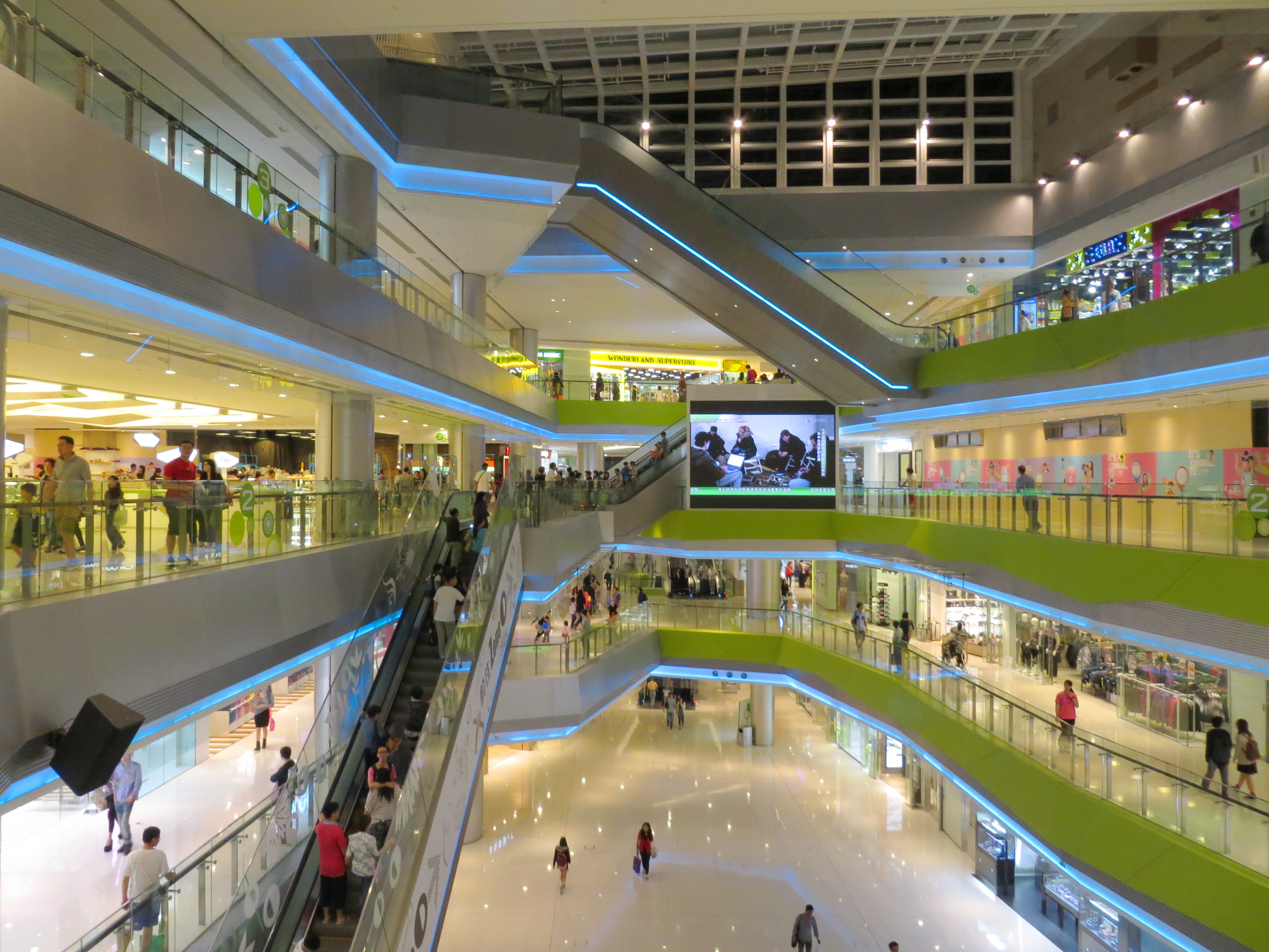
- Location: Kowloon, Hong Kong
- Coordinates: 22.2963°N 114.2385°E
- Address: 38 Ko Chiu Road, Yau Tong
- Opened: 29 September 2012; 14 years ago
- Developer: Hong Kong Housing Authority
- Owner: Hong Kong Housing Authority
- Num. of stores: 150
- Floor area: 45,000 sq ft (4,200 m^{2})

Domain
- Chinese: 大本型
Transcriptions
Standard Mandarin
- Hanyu Pinyin: Dà Běn Xíng
Yue: Cantonese
- Jyutping: daai6 bun2 jing4

Domain (Chinese: 大本型) is a shopping centre located next to Yau Tong station in Yau Tong, Kwun Tong District, Kowloon, Hong Kong. The shopping centre is serving about 80,000 people in Yau Tong Estate, Yau Lai Estate, Yau Chui Court, Yau Mei Court and Lei Yue Mun Estate. It is the largest one owned by Hong Kong Housing Authority after most of its shopping centre assets were sold to Link REIT in 2005.

== Description ==
Domain has a total gross floor area of about 45,000 square metres. It has eight floors with total lettable area of 23,000 square metres. The four-level retail space can accommodate some 150 shops of different varieties. It also includes a community hall and a public transport interchange for buses, minibuses and cross-border coaches.

== History ==
Known in the planning stages as "Shopping Centre at Yau Tong Estate Redevelopment Phase 4", the complex cost about HK$1.5 billion to construct. The construction contract was awarded by the Housing Authority to China State Construction Engineering (HK) in November 2009. The shopping centre opened as "Domain" on 29 September 2012.

== See also ==
- Lei Yue Mun Plaza
