= This Town Needs =

Concert venue in Hong Kong

- TTN
- Address: 6 Shung Shun Street, Yau Tong
- Capacity: 400
- Type: Music venue
- Acreage: 9000 sq.ft.

Construction
- Opened: February 2018; 8 years ago
- Closed: February 2020; 6 years ago

Website
- https://www.thistownneeds.com/

This Town Needs was a concert venue located in a commercial space on the first floor of Ocean One, Yau Tong, Hong Kong, opened in February 2018. It has an area of 18,000 square feet, and has a maximum capacity of 400 persons. Citing monetary reasons, the venue has shut down since February 2020.

== Background ==
This Town Needs was founded out of defunct live house Hidden Agenda. The name This Town Needs was a reference to British rock band This Town Needs Guns, who were arrested for performing at Hidden Agenda in 2017.

The venue held a liquor license and a place of public entertainment license, unlike its predecessor Hidden Agenda, which did not operate legally as an entertainment venue.

This Town Needs announced its closure in February 2020, with its final concert being held on 27 February featuring six local bands. Amidst the COVID-19 pandemic, the event managed to sell out quickly, with early-bird and door tickets both selling out hours before the event. Over 600 people attended the farewell show, marking it as one of the most attended events of This Town Needs.

== Notable performances ==
The venue has hosted bands and artists from various genres around the world.

Some notable past performers include Metz, Intervals, Snail Mail, Polyphia, While She Sleeps, Ne Obliviscaris, The Marías, and As I Lay Dying.

== Services and facilities ==
The venue was home to local music festivals This Town Needs Noize and Detuned Radio Festival, which curated local talent and showcased up-and-coming bands and artists such as Maniac, Instinct of Sight, Tyson Yoshi, Matt Force, Strange Lives, Luna is a Bep, Franklin Telescope, and more.

In addition to being a concert venue, This Town Needs provided event space for talks, exhibitions, presentations, and screenings.

The venue also offered various alcoholic and non-alcoholic beverages to patrons with its fully licensed bar, featuring its own house special craft beer.
