= Ocean One =

Ocean One may refer to:

- Ocean One (Atlantic City), a pier that had operated as a shopping mall in Atlantic City, New Jersey.
- Ocean One (Hong Kong), mixed commercial–residential property in Yau Tong, Hong Kong
- Ocean One (Panama City), residential building in Costa del Este, Panama City, Panama
- Ocean 1 Tower, proposed skyscraper in Pattaya, Thailand
