= Ko Chiu Road Estate =

Public housing estate in Hong Kong

Coordinates: 22.29703°N 114.24019°E

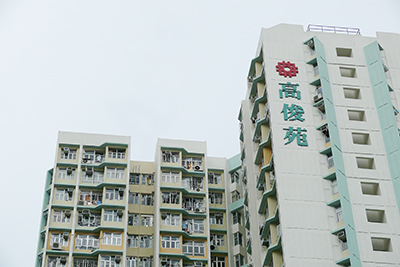
Ko Chun Court - Ko Chiu Road Phase 2 in June 2008

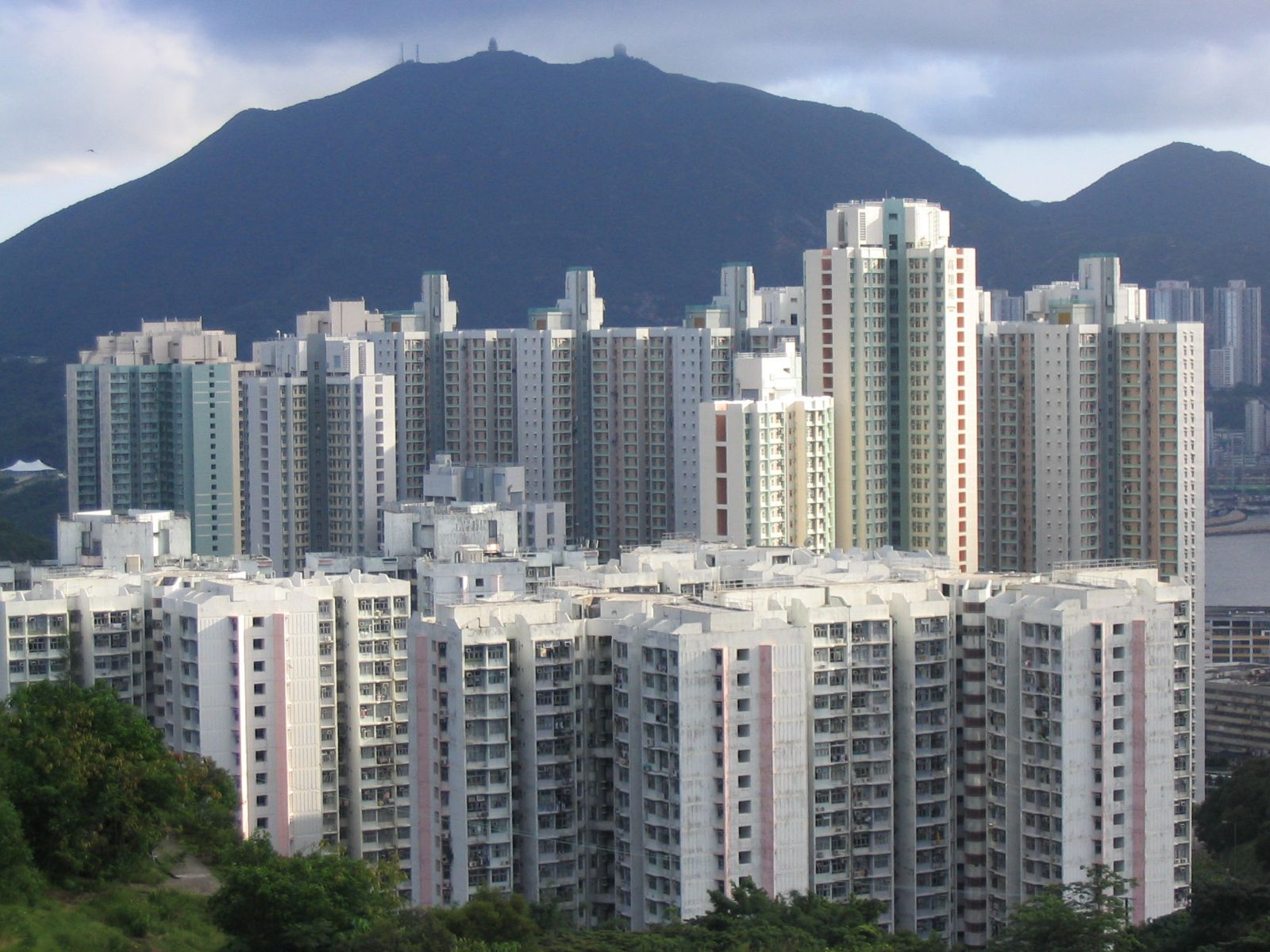
Ko Cheung Court - Ko Chiu Road Phase 3 in October 2005

Ko Chiu Road Estate (Chinese: 高超道邨) was a public housing estate in Ko Chiu Road, the upper hill of Yau Tong, Kwun Tong District, Kowloon, Hong Kong.

In 1964, the British Hong Kong Government announced that the estate would be named Yau Tong Bay Government Low Cost Estate (Chinese: 油塘灣政府廉租屋邨) (later Ko Chiu Road Government Low Cost Estate, Chinese: 高超道政府廉租屋邨). It consisted of 11 blocks, built between 1971 and 1973. In 1973, the estate was renamed as Ko Chiu Road Estate.

The estate started redevelopment in the 1990s. The redevelopment plan was divided into 5 phases to construct Ko Yee Estate (Phase 1), Ko Chun Court (Phase 2) and Ko Cheung Court (Phase 3).

== See also ==
- Public housing estates in Yau Tong
- Yau Tong Estate
