= Ocean One (Hong Kong) =

Skyscraper in Hong Kong

Coordinates: 22°17′34″N 114°14′16″E

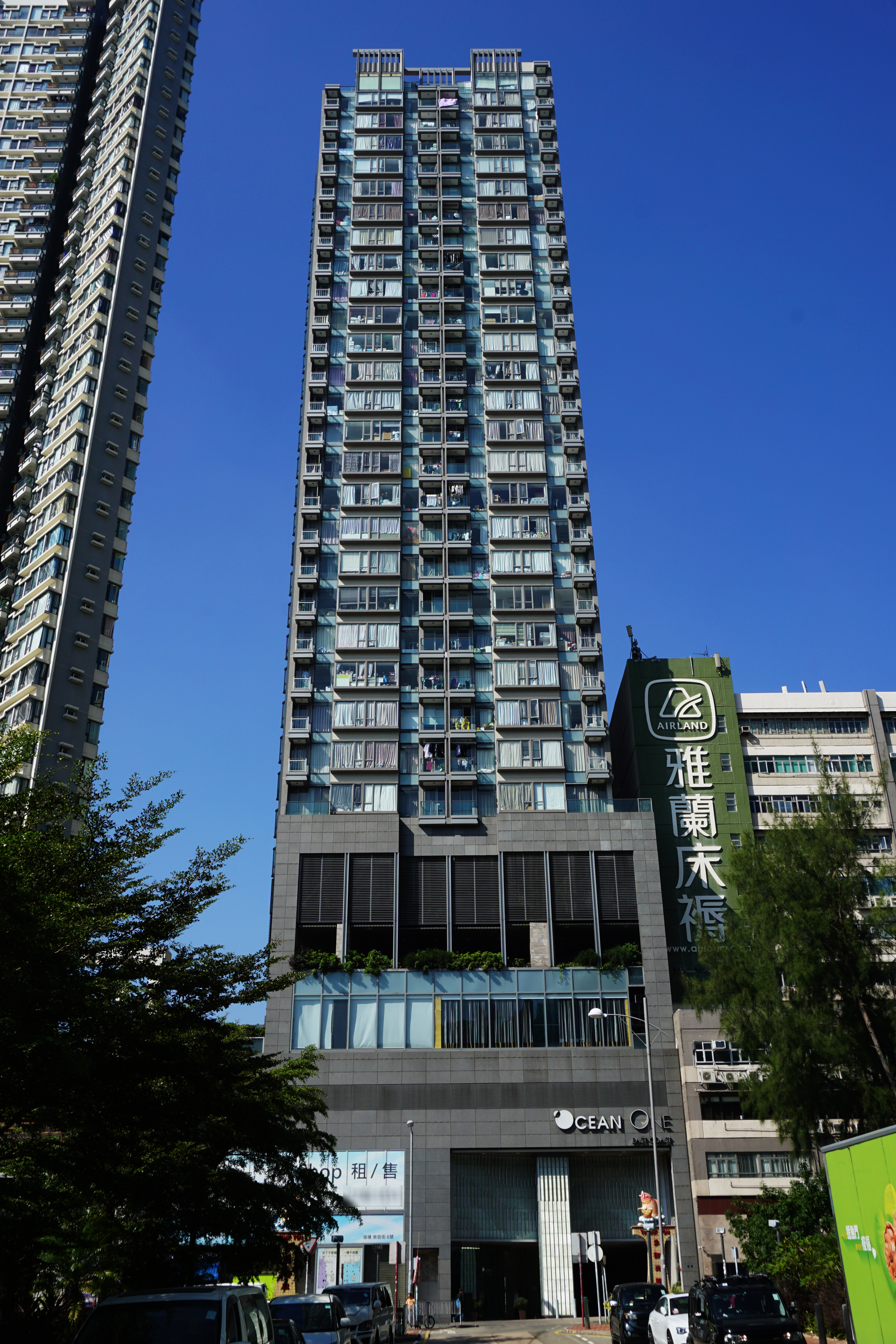
Ocean One in December 2016

Ocean One is a mixed commercial–residential property in Yau Tong, Hong Kong, completed in January 2013. It is located in an industrial area near Lei Yue Mun, approximately 10 minutes' walking distance from Yau Tong MTR station. The building contains a total of 124 residential units.

== History ==
The building was developed by Lai Sun Development, and its apartments were first offered for sale in October 2012 at an average price per square foot of HK$10,326. Apple Daily criticised the unreasonably high price compared to the prices of units at Canaryside and The Spectacle, two nearby residential buildings, which at the time averaged HK$7,000 per square foot.

Ocean One opened a show flat for viewing in September 2012, one month before flats were first offered for sale. Two flats were sold on the first day. Lai Sun halted sales in June 2013 citing errors in its sales brochure, which needed to be rectified to comply with new government regulations on sales of new apartment units. At that point, only 14 of the 124 flats had been sold, despite increasing discounts.

=== Secret photography controversy ===
During the six-month period between September 2012 and March 2013, 63 prospective buyers visiting the development were secretly photographed while using the toilet inside the show flat, until a woman discovered that she was being photographed without consent. Lee Yeung-kai, a manager at Lai Sun Development, admitted to the unauthorised photography and to 29 charges of access to computer with criminal or dishonest intent at trial in December 2013.

=== Misleading advertisement controversy ===
From May 2013 through May 2014, Lai Sun Development placed advertisements and created sales brochures for Ocean One which stated that the property was being sold at a 10% discount, though this discount was not available to all buyers. In October 2016, the Sales of First-hand Residential Properties Authority ruled that the advertisement was misleading because it did not specify that the discount only applied to purchases made by cash or immediate hire purchase.

== Commercial use ==
This Town Needs, a concert venue, was located in a commercial space on the first floor of Ocean One. The venue started hosting concerts in February 2018, but closed its doors in February 2020 amid the coronavirus outbreak.
