= Ko Yee Estate =

Public housing estate in Yau Tong, Hong Kong

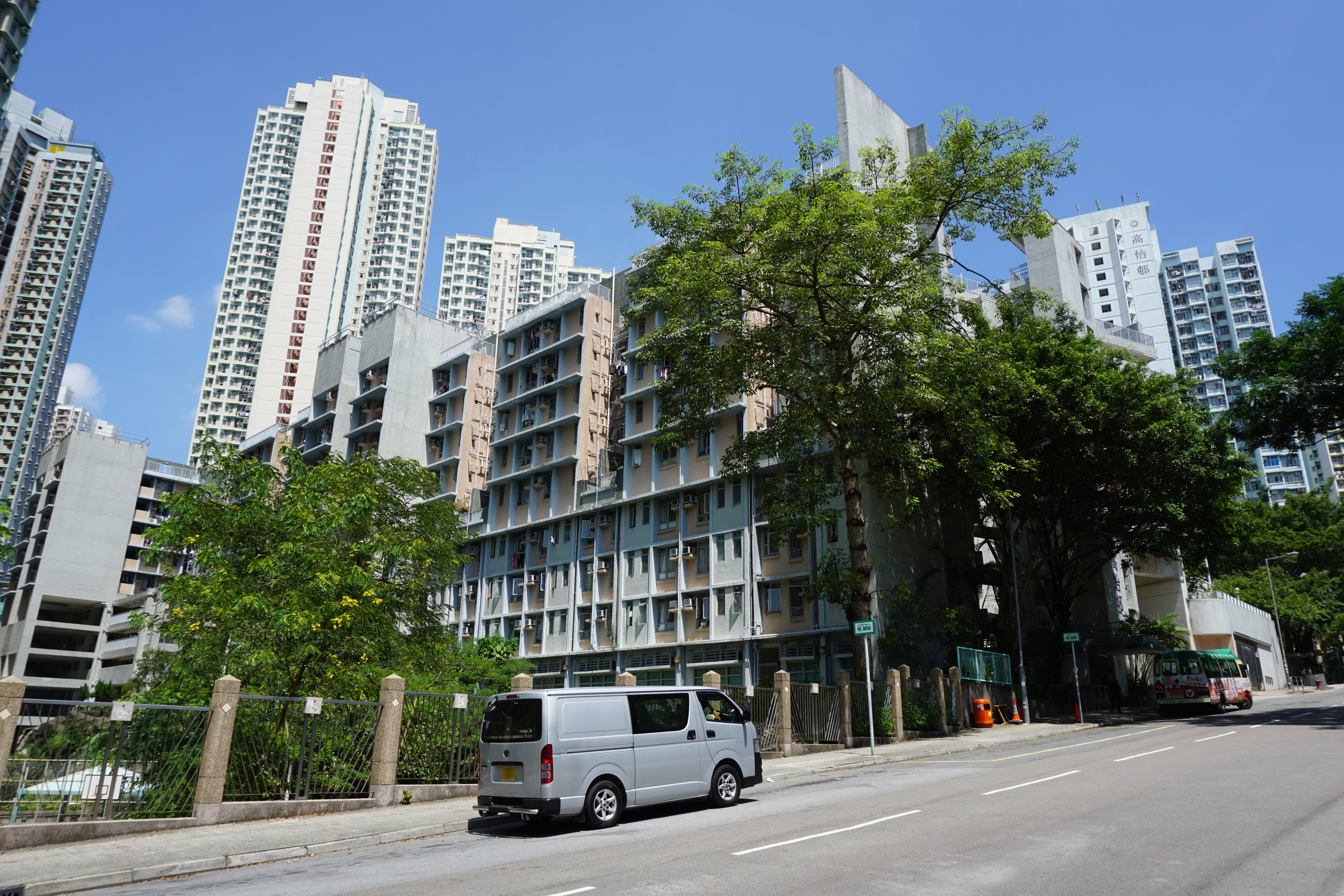
- Ko Yee Estate
- Interactive map of Ko Yee Estate

General information
- Location: 28 Ko Chiu Road, Yau Tong; Kowloon, Hong Kong
- Coordinates: 22.2973399°N 114.2413816°E
- Status: Completed
- Category: Public rental housing
- Population: 3,326 (2016)
- No. of blocks: 8
- No. of units: 1,278

Construction
- Constructed: 1994; 32 years ago
- Authority: Hong Kong Housing Authority

Ko Yee Estate (Chinese: 高怡邨) is a public housing estate in Yau Tong, Kowloon, Hong Kong. It is built as a part of the demolished Ko Chiu Road Estate. The estate comprises four blocks offering 1,300 units completed between 1994 and 2000.

== Background ==
The estate was formerly known as blocks 3 to 6 of Ko Chiu Road Estate, it was completed in 1972 and the demolition project started in 1991. The blocks were only 19 years old at the time of demolition. Four new houses were rebuilt as part of the demolished Ko Chiu Road Estate.

== Houses ==
Name	Chinese name	Building type	Completed
Ko Chi House	高志樓	Harmony 1	1994
Ko Yuen House	高遠樓	Harmony 1	1994
Ko Shing House	高盛樓	Small Household Block	2000
Ko Yuet House	高悅樓	Small Household Block	2000

== Demographics ==
According to the 2016 by-census, Ko Yee Estate had a population of 3,326. The median age was 46.4 and the majority of residents (99.1 per cent) were of Chinese ethnicity. The average household size was 2.8 people. The median monthly household income of all households (i.e. including both economically active and inactive households) was HK$23,360.

== Politics ==
Ko Yee Estate is located in Yau Tong East constituency of the Kwun Tong District Council. It is currently represented by Ricky Kung Chun-ki, who was elected in the 2019 elections.

== See also ==
- Public housing estates in Yau Tong
