= Strange Lives (EP) =

2018 EP by Strange Lives

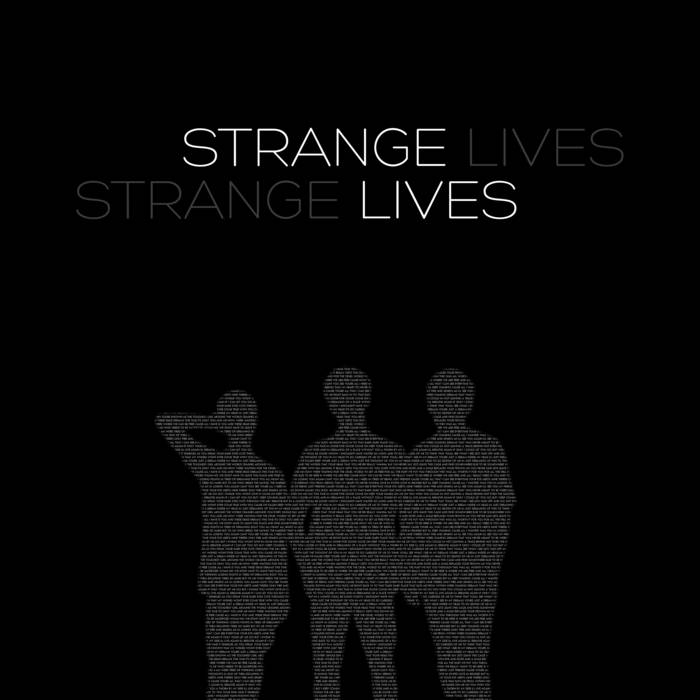

EP by Strange Lives
- Released: October 26, 2018
- Recorded: 2018
- Genres: Alternative rock, indie rock
- Length: 19:54
- Label: Self-released
- Producer: Elliott Wan

Singles from Strange Lives
- 1. "Losing You Again" Released: August 26, 2018; 2. "A Dream Away" Released: Oct 4, 2018

Strange Lives is the first EP by Hong Kong indie rock trio Strange Lives. It was released on October 26, 2018.

== Recording and release ==
The EP was recorded during the summer of 2018 in vocalist Elliott Wan's home. Production on this EP was also done by Wan, combining his indie influences with various genres such as pop punk, hard rock, and synthpop.

The album spawned singles "Losing You Again" and "A Dream Away", released August 24 and October 4 on the same year respectively.

== Critical reception ==
Critical reception of the EP was positive upon its release. In a positive review for SCMP Young Post, Chris Gillett described the album as "[a] promising debut show[ing] us they have the songwriting potential to make it big", and gave the album 4 stars out of 5. Gillett describes "Colors" as "instantly reminiscent of many indie rock bands of the mid-2000s. The understated post-punk bass lines, guitar riffs and soft melodic vocals from Elliot Wan feel like Snow Patrol meets The Fray, but with a little more grit, along with some interesting wordplay."

Simon Donald Jones from The Underground HK, praised the production of the album, saying that "with seemingly limited time and experience, this trio of HK indie rockers have crafted a self-titled EP that really is very, very good," singling out opening track "Colors" as an example. "The beautifully uplifting chorus reminds me of the 00s UK rock band Elliot Minor, who as it happens were incredibly young when they first found popularity and share their name with lead singer Elliot Wan." Adding on, he praises the whispered spoken word middle eight, and compares it with something that American rock band Thirty Seconds to Mars would do. Furthermore, Jones comments that "Strange Lives seem to know what their sound is and to me there’s cohesion in their sonic voice. At times you might find their lyrical content immature – teenage jealousy and infatuation – but these are emotions we can experience at any age. This a band for everybody. Not just teenagers." He concludes that "sometimes age and experience don’t matter when something is good. And Strange Lives are good. It’s about time Hong Kong produced some world beaters and these guys have just the right tools to maybe be it."

NewEars Music described the album's musical style as 'teeming with brit-rock', and praised the group for actively using synthesizers in addition to basic 3-piece instrumentation during the production of the EP.

Professional ratings
Review scores
Source	Rating
SCMP Young Post	4/5 stars

== Track listing ==
All lyrics are written by Elliott Wan; all music is composed by Strange Lives.

No.	Title	Length
1.	"Colors"	4:23
2.	"A Dream Away"	4:28
3.	"This Time"	4:01
4.	"Losing You Again"	3:18
5.	"Back to You"	3:44
Total length:		19:54

== Personnel ==
Credits retrieved from liner notes and MusicBrainz.

Strange Lives

- Elliott Wan – lead vocals, guitar, bass, synths, drums (tracks 4), production, artwork
- Ethan Tang - drums (tracks 1, 3, 5)
- Ethan Yim - drums (track 2)

Additional personnel

- Martin Merenyi – mixing (tracks 1, 2)
- Joseph Chudyk – mixing (tracks 3, 5)
- John Benedict Pereira – mixing (track 4)
- Maor Barazani – mastering
- Jonathan Sim – Drum engineer, additional percussion (tracks 2)
