= Yau Mei Court and Yau Chui Court =

Home Ownership Scheme housing estate in Hong Kong

Coordinates: 22.297485°N 114.239117°E

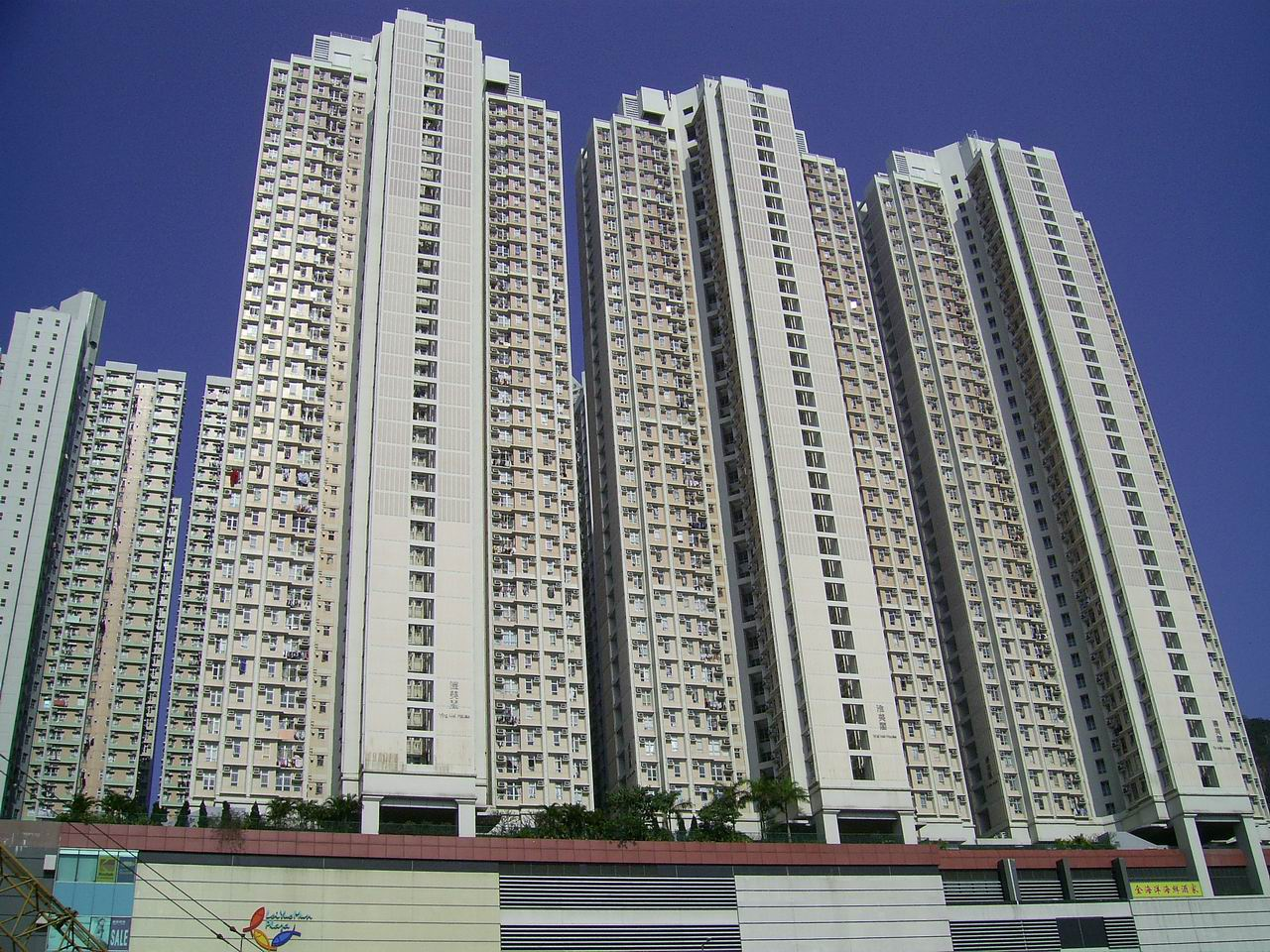
Yau Mei Court

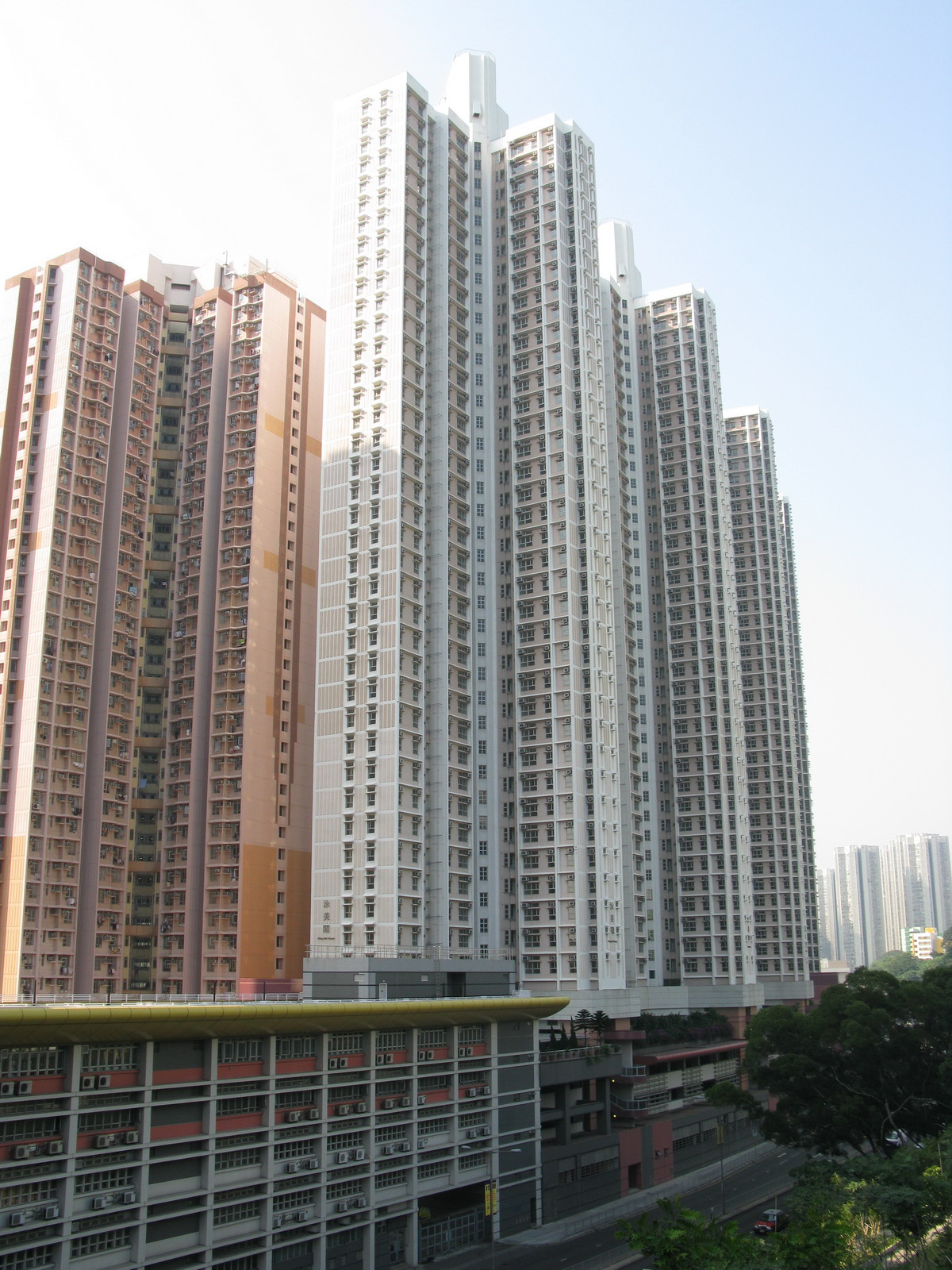
Yau Chui Court

Yau Mei Court (Chinese: 油美苑) is a Home Ownership Scheme court and government quarters in Yau Tong, Kwun Tong District, Kowloon, Hong Kong, located along Lei Yue Mun Road next to MTR Yau Tong station.

Yau Mei Court belongs to Yau Tong Estate Redevelopment Phase 3 and was completed in 2002. In 2002, Block A (Ching Mei House) was converted to public rental housing after the Hong Kong Housing Authority decided to suspend HOS sales to the public. In 2005, seven court blocks were also converted to government quarters.

The remaining four blocks together were renamed Yau Chui Court (Chinese: 油翠苑). In 2009, one of the blocks, Block E, was sold to the public.

== Houses ==
Name	Type	Usage	Completion	Occupation
Block A, Ching Mei House	New Cruciform Block (Ver.1999)	Rental housing	2002	2002
Block B, Yuk Mei House	New Cruciform Block (Ver.1999)	HOS	2002	2009
Block C, Yeung Mei House	New Cruciform Block (Ver.1999)	HOS	2002	2009
Block D, Yat Mei House	New Cruciform Block (Ver.1999)	HOS	2002	2009
Block E, Wing Mei House	New Cruciform Block (Ver.1999)	HOS	2002	2009
Block F, Chak Mei House	New Cruciform Block (Ver.1999)	Government quarters	2002	2005
Block G, Yun Mei House	New Cruciform Block (Ver.1999)	Government quarters	2002	2005
Block H, Shuk Mei House	New Cruciform Block (Ver.1999)	Government quarters	2002	2005
Block I, Ho Mei House	New Cruciform Block (Ver.1999)	Government quarters	2002	2005
Block J, Ying Mei House	New Cruciform Block (Ver.1999)	Government quarters	2002	2005
Block K, Wai Mei House	New Cruciform Block (Ver.1999)	Government quarters	2002	2005
Block L, To Mei House	New Cruciform Block (Ver.1999)	Government quarters	2002	2005

== See also ==
- Yau Tong Estate
- Public housing estates in Yau Tong
- Lei Yue Mun Plaza
