= Strange Lives =

Indie rock band

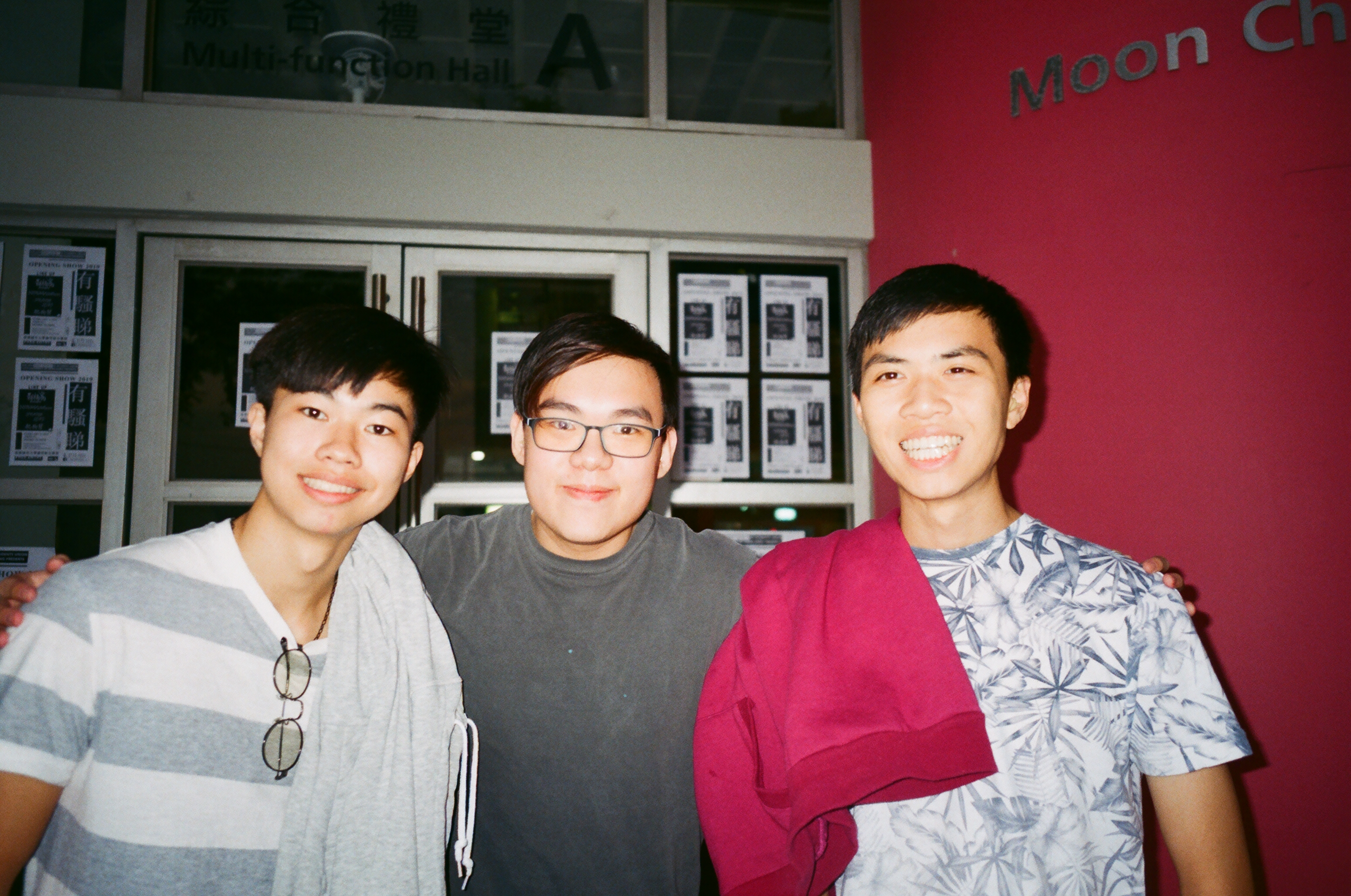
- Strange Lives in February 2019. From left to right: drummer Ethan Yim, frontman Elliott Wan, and bassist Ethan Tang

Background information
- Origin: Hong Kong
- Genres: Indie rock, pop rock, alternative rock
- Years active: 2018–2021
- Members: Elliott Wan; Ethan Tang; Ethan Yim
- Website: www.strangelivesband.com

Strange Lives was an indie rock band from Hong Kong, formed in 2018, consisting of Elliott Wan (lead vocals, guitars, keyboards), Ethan Tang (bass, backing vocals), and Ethan Yim (drums, percussion).

== Background ==
Originally a solo project by frontman Elliott Wan, the band formed when bassist Ethan Tang and drummer Ethan Yim were added to the line up in February 2018. They finished writing and recording their debut self-titled EP October 2018, and went on to play at different local festivals and events such as This Town Needs Noize 3 and Lion Rocks Music Fest in support of their EP release.

"Right Now" was released February 26, 2019, along with an accompanying music video.

A studio cover of Billie Eilish's 'bad guy' was released May 26 of the same year.

The band opened for Russian post-punk band Motorama (band) in June 2019.

In June 2020, the band announced a new EP, and released single "Pretty Cool" on July 3 with an accompanying animated video.

Today's No Different EP was released July 31, 2020, accompanied with a virtual album release show Live From Home, released digitally on October 2, 2020.

Strange Lives have drawn comparisons in their sound with various alternative British bands such as Snow Patrol, Kaiser Chiefs, and Arctic Monkeys.

== Discography ==
Extended plays

- Strange Lives EP (2018)
- Today's No Different EP (2020)
- Live from Home (2020)
- SL3 EP (2021)

Singles

- "Losing You Again" (2018)
- "A Dream Away" (2018)
- "Right Now" (2019)
- "Pretty Cool" (2020)
- "(Love Won't) Break My Fall (2020)

== Members ==
- Elliott Wan - lead vocals, guitars, synthesizers
- Ethan Tang - bass
- Ethan Yim - drums
