= Public housing estates in Yau Tong =

Public housing in Yau Tong, Hong Kong

The following is an overview of public housing estates in Yau Tong, Kwun Tong, Kowloon, Hong Kong, including Home Ownership Scheme (HOS), Private Sector Participation Scheme (PSPS), and Tenants Purchase Scheme (TPS) estates.

== Overview ==
Name		Type	Inaug.	No Blocks	No Units	Notes
Ko Cheung Court	高翔苑	Public/GQ	2004	5	1,800	
Ko Chun Court	高俊苑	HOS	1995	5	1,616	
Ko Yee Estate	高怡邨	Public	1994	4	1,278	
Lei Yue Mun Estate	鯉魚門邨	Public	2002	3	2,397	
Yau Lai Estate	油麗邨	Public	2005	6	2,550	
Yau Mei Court and Yau Chui Court	油美苑及油翠苑	HOS/GQ	2002	11	3,872	
Yau Tong Centre	油塘中心	PSPS	1981	9	506	
Yau Tong Estate	油塘邨	Public	2000	5	3,596	

== Ko Cheung Court ==
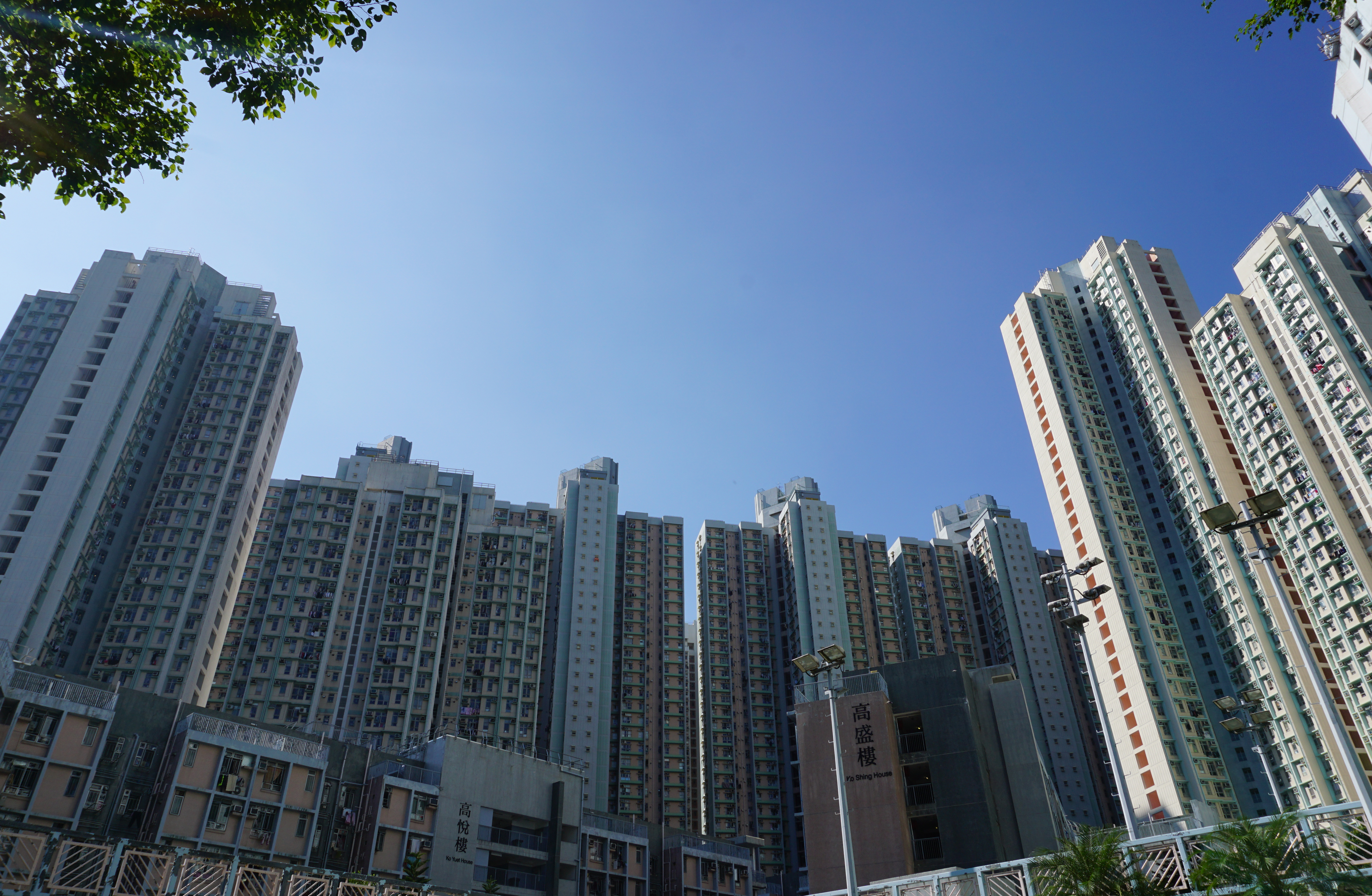
Ko Cheung Court

Ko Cheung Court (Chinese: 高翔苑) consists of nine blocks built in 2004.

Developed in the Ko Chiu Road Redevelopment Phase 5, the estate was planned to be an HOS estate. However, five blocks were converted to public rental housing and another four blocks were converted to government quarters before occupation.

=== Houses ===
Name	Type	Usage	Completion
Ko Hang House	New Cruciform Block (Ver.1999)	Rental housing	2004
Ko Ki House	New Cruciform Block (Ver.1999)	Rental housing	2004
Ko Lun House	New Cruciform Block (Ver.1999)	Rental housing	2004
Ko On House	New Cruciform Block (Ver.1999)	Rental housing	2004
Ko Sui House	New Cruciform Block (Ver.1999)	Rental housing	2004
Ko Fei House	New Harmony 1	Government quarters	2004
Ko Ching House	New Harmony 1	Government quarters	2004
Ko Fung House	New Harmony 2	Government quarters	2004
Ko Hong House	New Harmony 2	Government quarters	2004

== Ko Chun Court ==
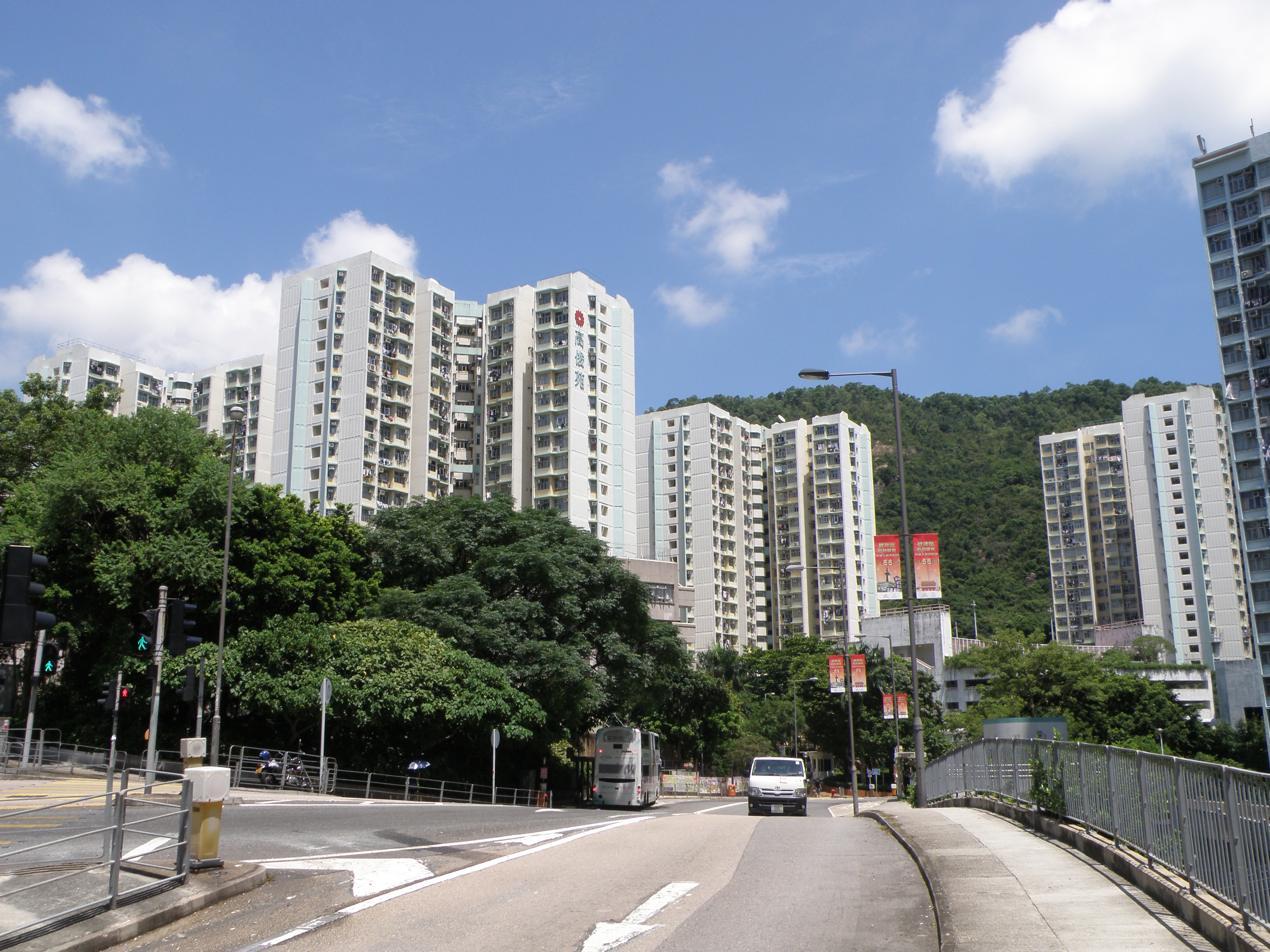
Ko Chun Court

Ko Chun Court (Chinese: 高俊苑) is an HOS court in Yau Tong, and was built as a part of the demolished Ko Chiu Road Estate. It consists of five blocks built in 1995.

=== Houses ===
Name	Type	Completion
Chun Wui House	Harmony 1A	1995
Chun Ying House	Harmony 1A	1995
Chun Moon House	Harmony 1A	1995
Chun Yat House	Harmony 1A	1995
Chun Mau House	Harmony 1A	1995

== Ko Yee Estate ==
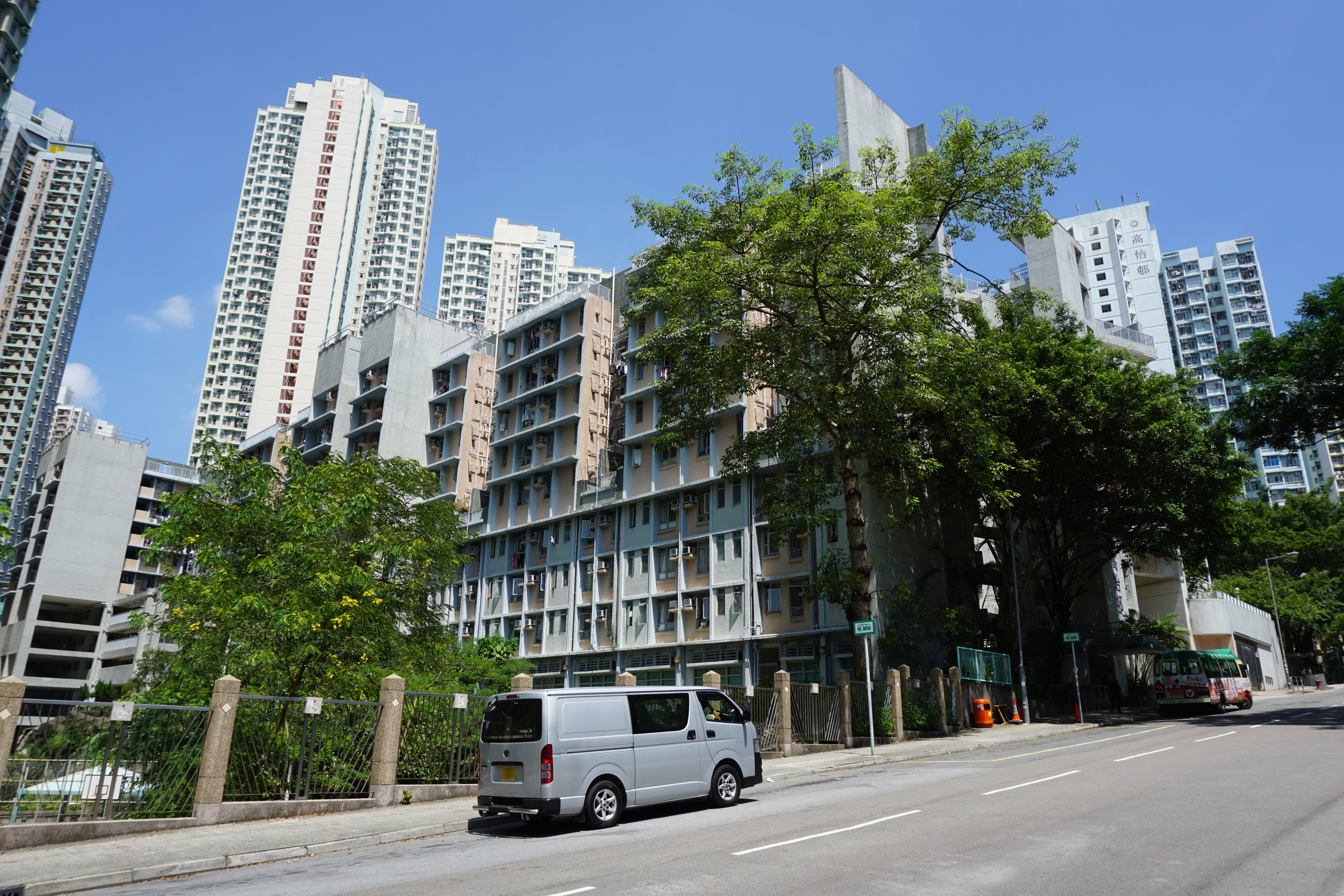
Ko Yee Estate

Ko Yee Estate (Chinese: 高怡邨) is built as a part of the demolished Ko Chiu Road Estate. The estate comprises four blocks offering 1,300 units.

=== Houses ===
Name	Type	Completion
Ko Chi House	Harmony 1	1994
Ko Yuen House	Harmony 1	1994
Ko Shing House	Small Household Block	2000
Ko Yuet House	Small Household Block	2000

== Lei Yue Mun Estate ==
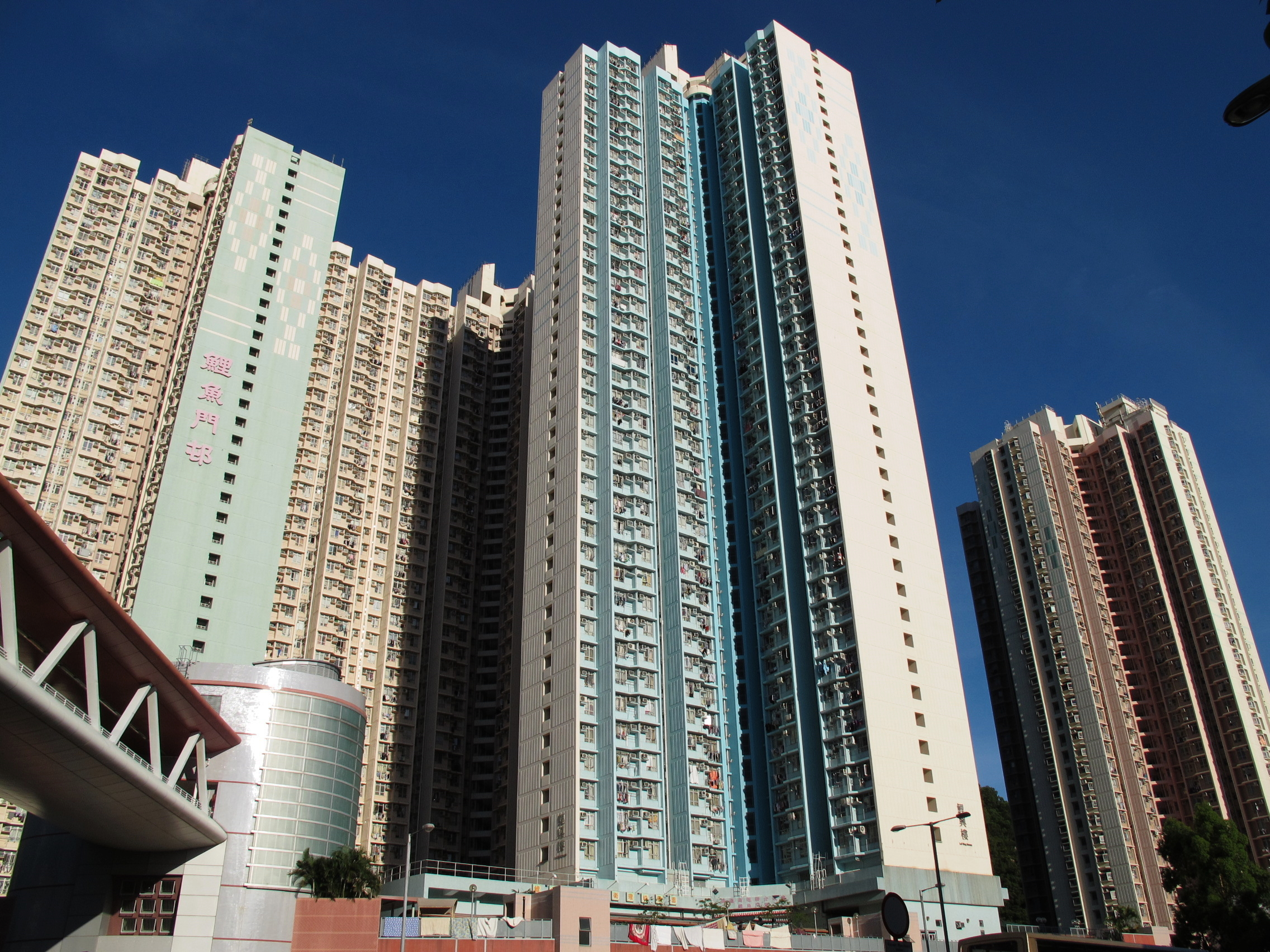
Lei Sang, Lei Ye, Lei Hing and Lei Lung House (from left to right)

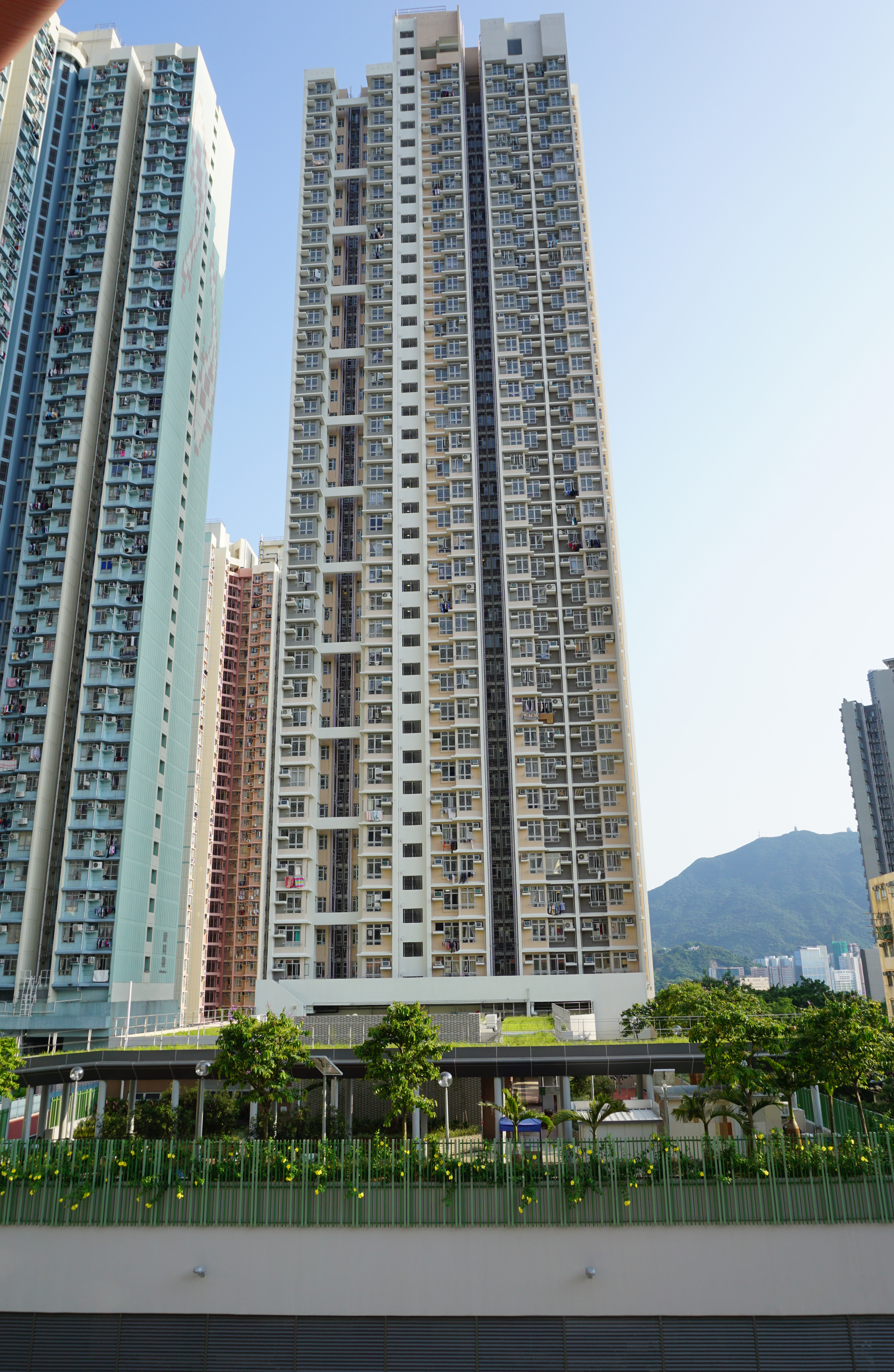
Lei Wong House

Lei Yue Mun Estate (Chinese: 鯉魚門邨) consists of five residential blocks built in 2001, 2002, 2007 and 2016.

=== Houses ===
Name	Type	Completion
Lei Sang House	Harmony 1	2001
Lei Ye House	Harmony 1	2001
Lei Hing House	Harmony 1	2002
Lei Lung House	Harmony 1	2007
Lei Wong House	Non-Standard Domestic Block	2016

== Yau Mei Court and Yau Chui Court ==
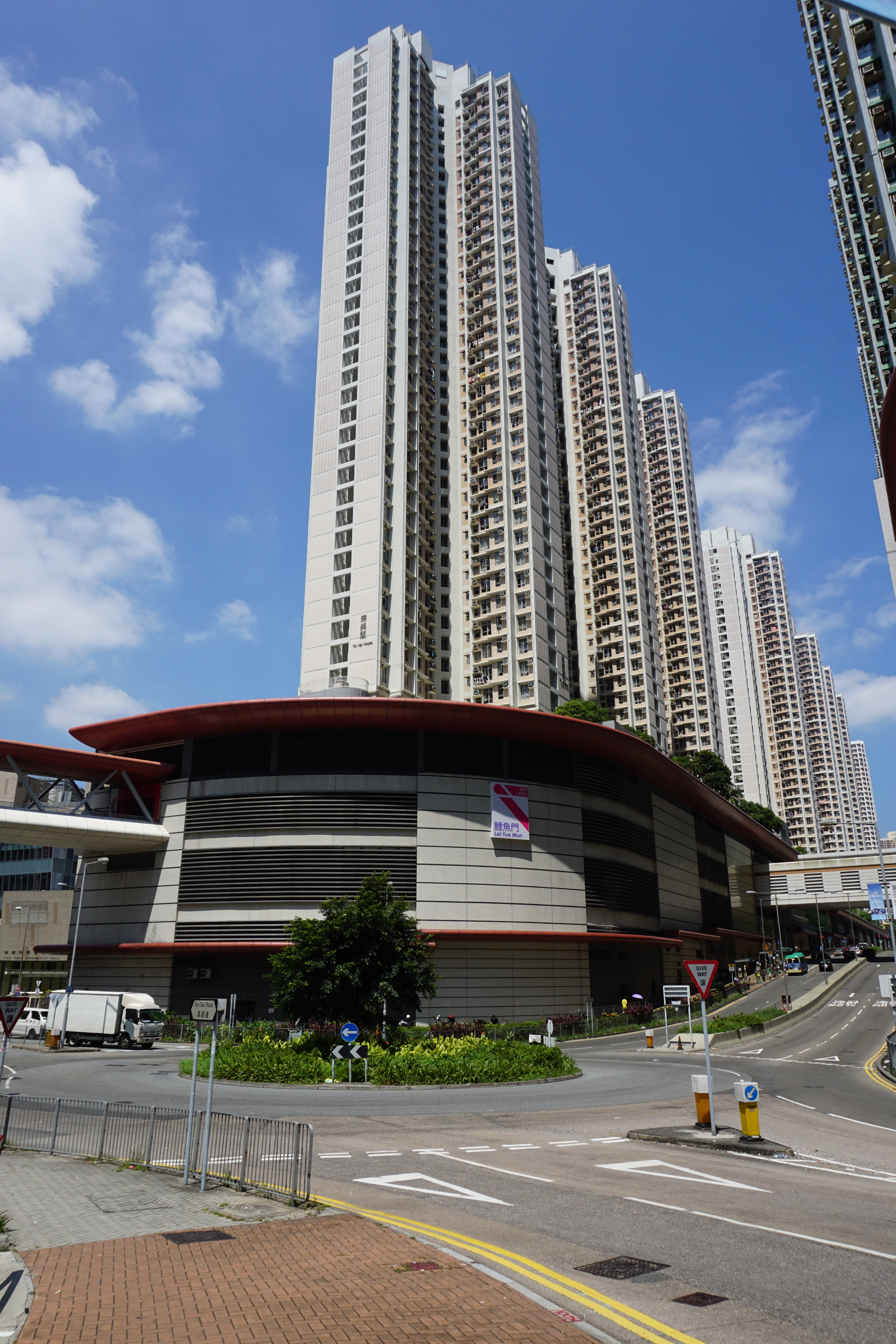
Yau Mei Court

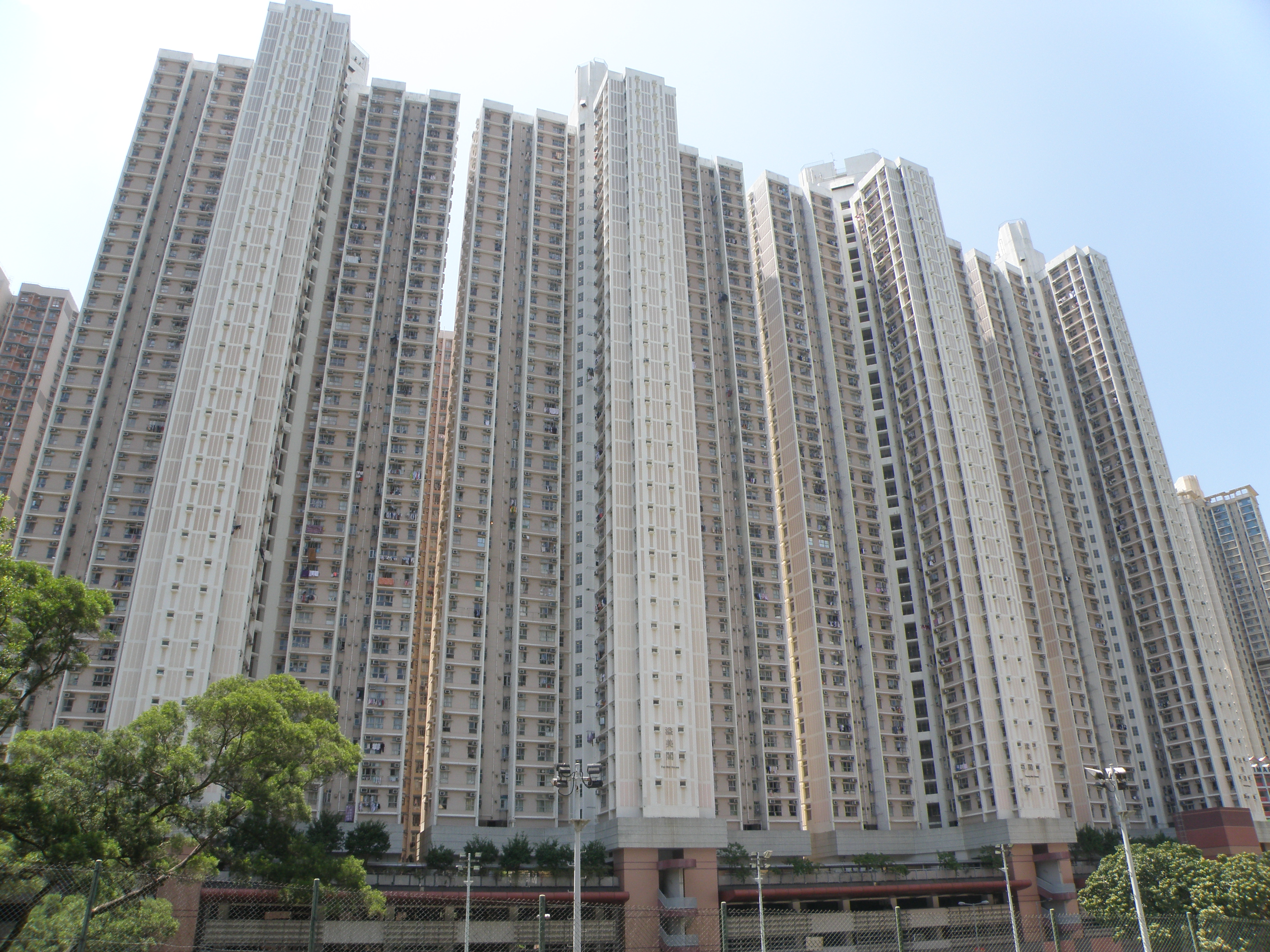
Yau Chui Court

Yau Mei Court (Chinese: 油美苑) and Yau Chui Court (Chinese: 油翠苑) are HOS courts and government quarters in Yau Tong, located along Lei Yue Mun Road next to Yau Tong MTR station.

== Yau Tong Centre ==
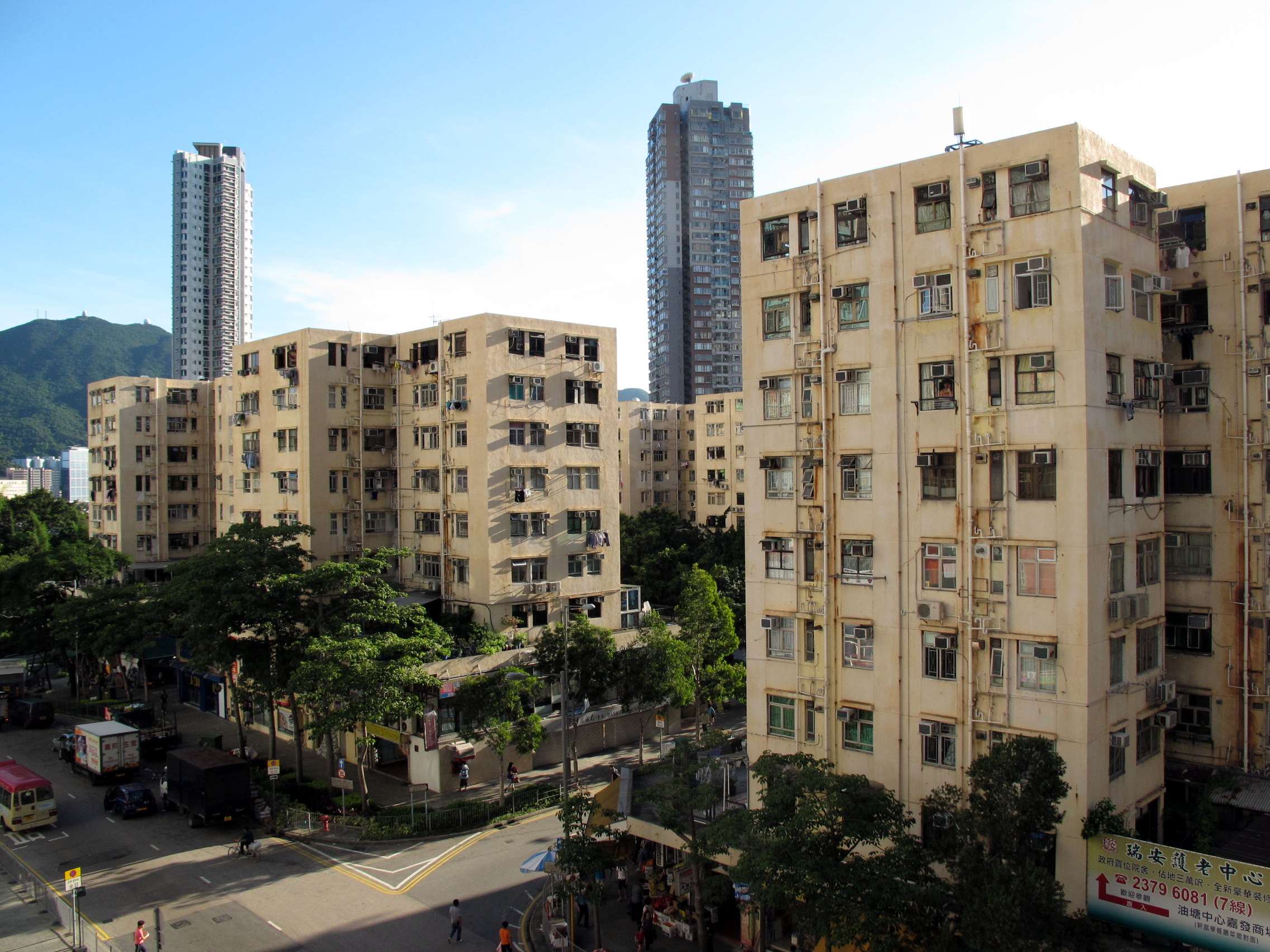
Yau Tong Centre

Yau Tong Centre (Chinese: 油塘中心) is a HOS and TPS court in Yau Tong, near Yau Tong MTR station, Yau Tong Bus Terminus, Lei Yue Mun Estate and Yau Tong Industrial Area. It consists of nine blocks built in 1981.

=== Houses ===
Name	Type	Completion
Tower 1	Private Sector Participation Scheme	1981
Tower 2	Private Sector Participation Scheme	1981
Tower 3	Private Sector Participation Scheme	1981
Tower 4	Private Sector Participation Scheme	1981
Tower 5	Private Sector Participation Scheme	1981
Tower 6	Private Sector Participation Scheme	1981
Tower 7	Private Sector Participation Scheme	1981
Tower 8	Private Sector Participation Scheme	1981
Tower 9	Private Sector Participation Scheme	1981

== Yau Tong Estate ==
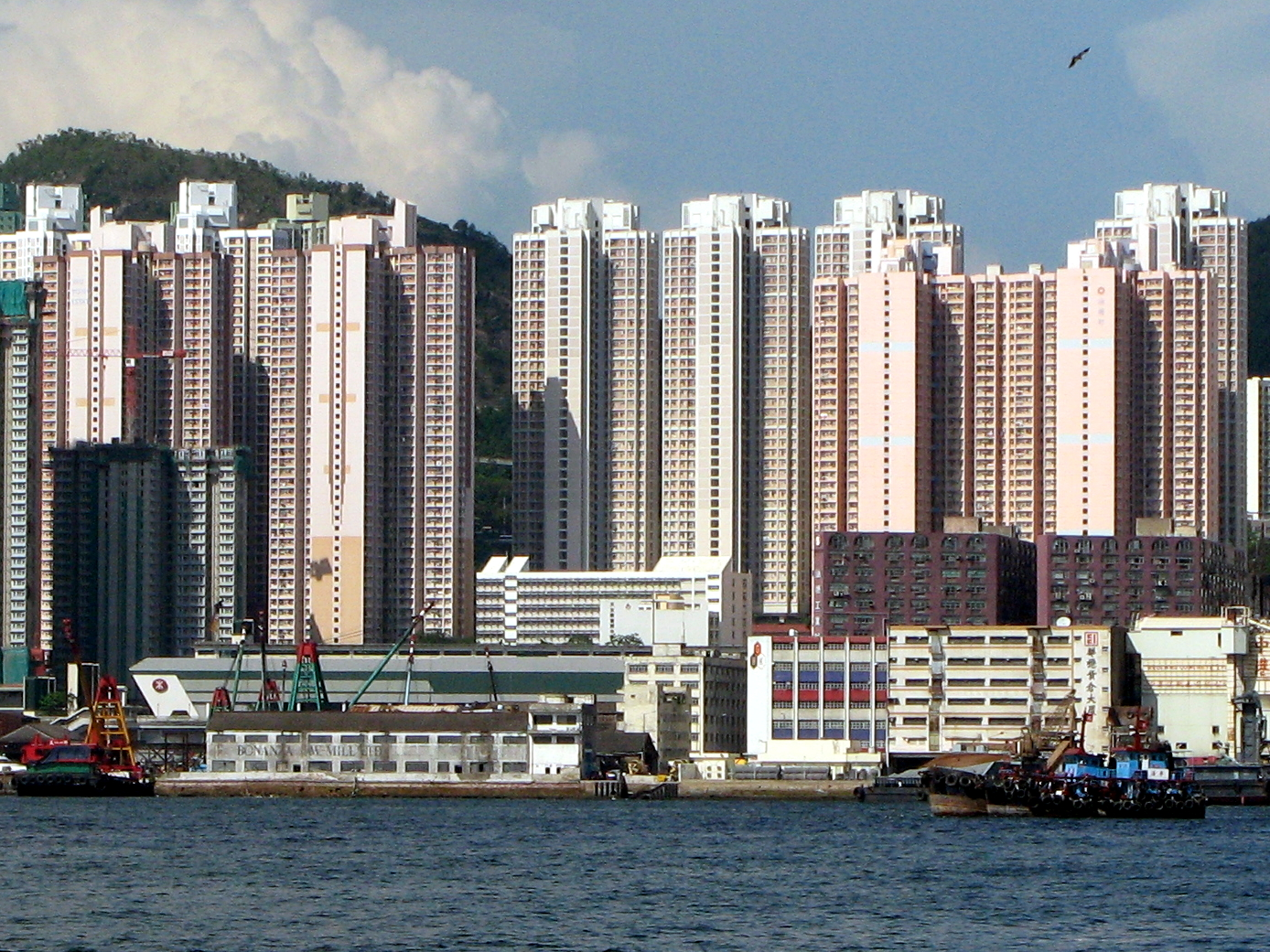
Yau Tong Estate

Yau Tong Estate (Chinese: 油塘邨) was a resettlement estate but it is now redeveloped.

== Yau Lai Estate ==
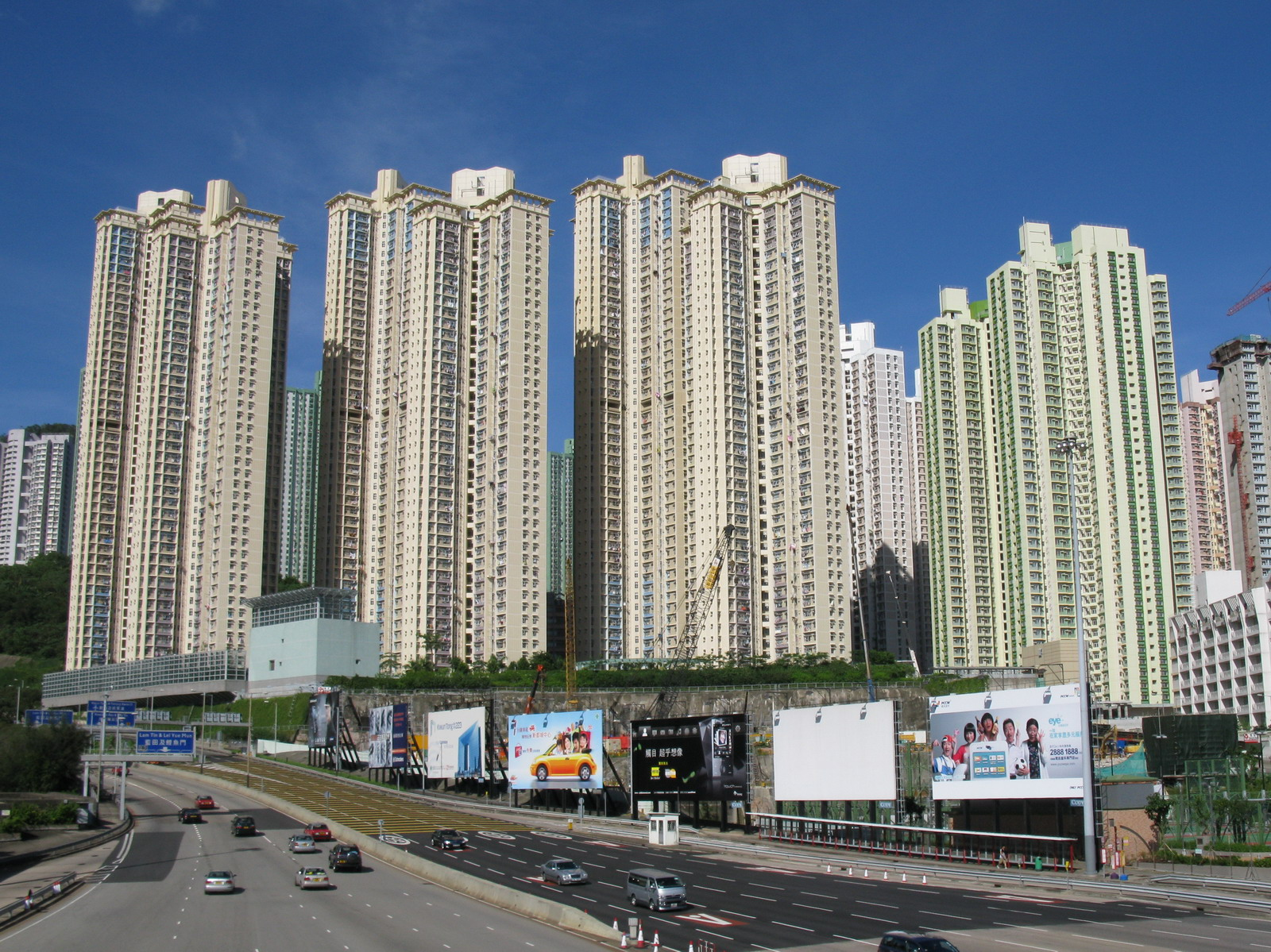
Yau Lai Estate

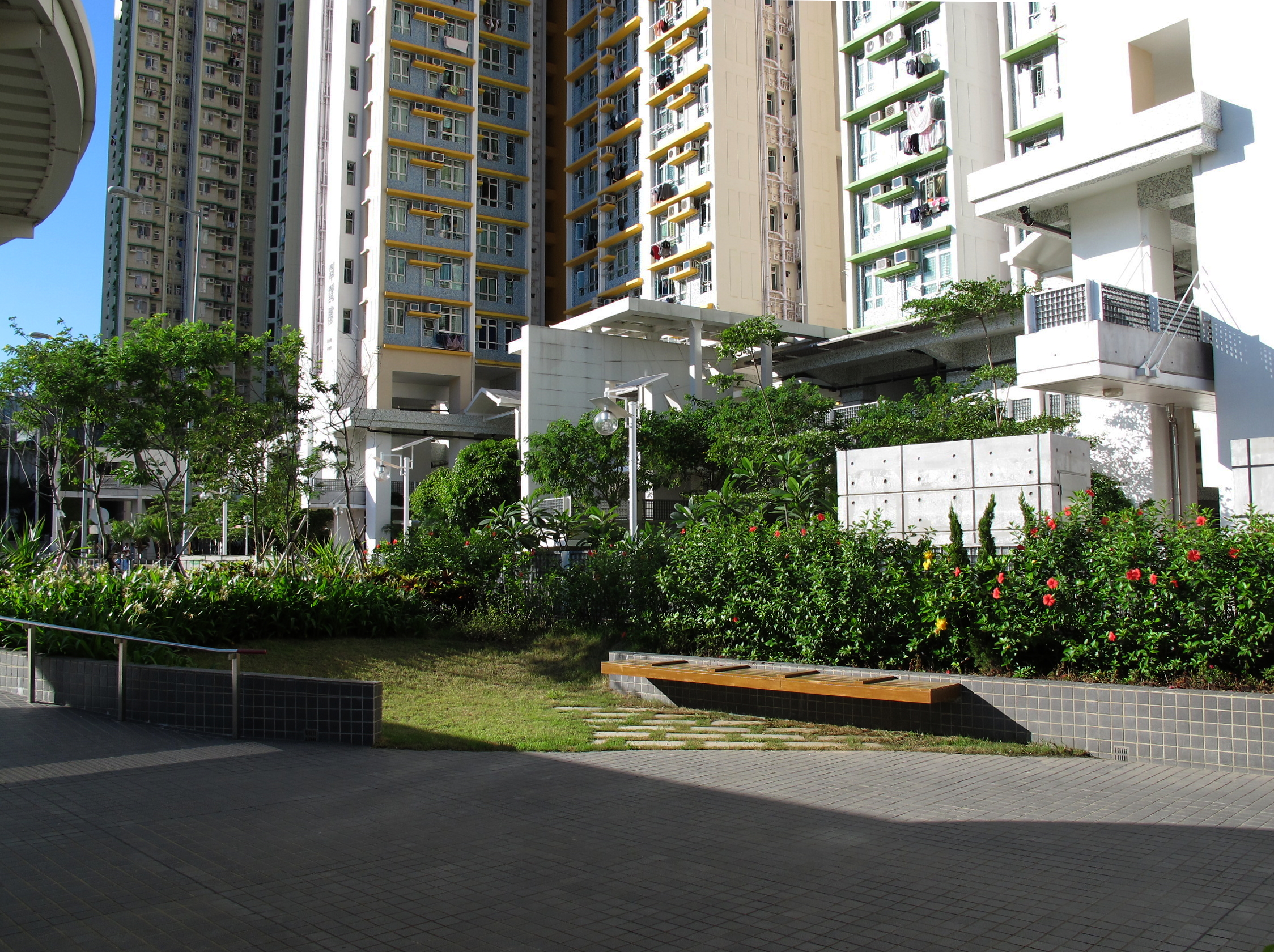
Yau Lai Estate Phase 4 Landscape Garden

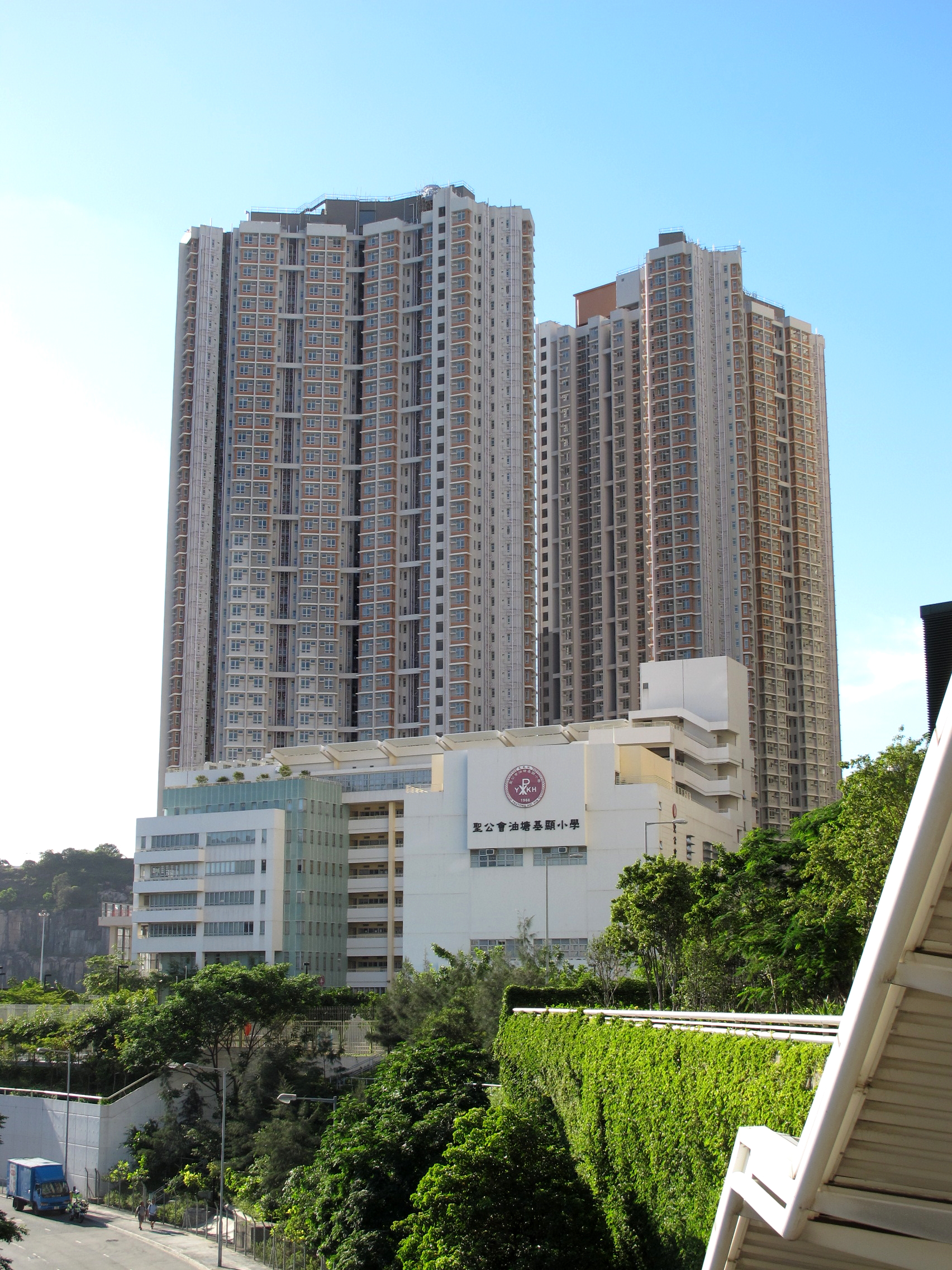
Yau Lai Estate Phase 5

Yau Lai Estate (Chinese: 油麗邨) is a public housing estate located near Eastern Harbour Crossing and Yau Tong MTR station. The estate was developed in four phases. Formerly an HOS estate, Phase 1 consists of six residential blocks completed in 2005. Phase 3 consists of 2 blocks completed in 2008. Phase 4 consists of 3 blocks completed in 2009. Phase 5 and 6 consist of 2 blocks completed in 2011. Phase 7 consist of 2 blocks completed in 2019.

=== Houses ===
Name	Type	Completion
Bik Lai House	New Cruciform Block (Ver.1999)	2005
Chi Lai House	New Cruciform Block (Ver.1999)	2005
Nga Lai House	New Cruciform Block (Ver.1999)	2005
Sau Lai House	New Cruciform Block (Ver.1999)	2005
Yat Lai House	New Cruciform Block (Ver.1999)	2005
Yi Lai House	New Cruciform Block (Ver.1999)	2005
Ying Lai House	New Harmony 1	2008
Fung Lai House	New Harmony 1	2008
Hong Lai House	Non-standard (Cruciform Block)	2009
Tsui Lai House	Non-standard (Cruciform Block)	2009
Yan Lai House	Non-standard (Cruciform Block)	2009
Cheuk Lai House	Non-standard (Y-Shaped)	2011
Yung Lai House	Non-standard (Y-Shaped)	2011
Sun Lai House	Non-standard (W-Shaped)	2019
