= Yau Tong station =

MTR interchange station in Kowloon, Hong Kong

Yau Tong 油塘
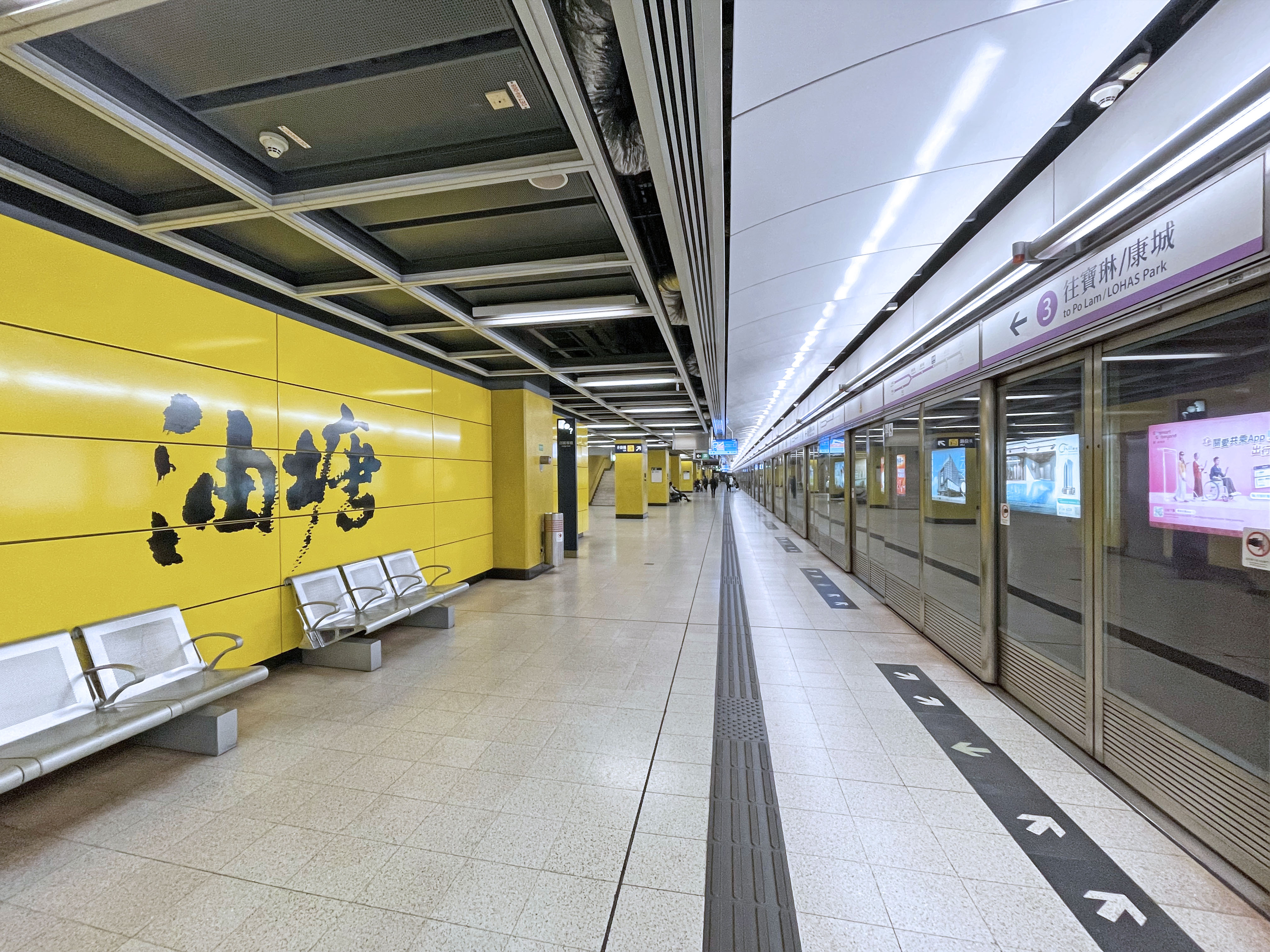
- Platform 3 of Yau Tong station in November 2022

Chinese name
- Chinese: 油塘
- Jyutping: jau^{4} tong^{4}
- Hanyu Pinyin: Yóutáng
- Literal meaning: Oil Pond
Transcriptions
Standard Mandarin
- Hanyu Pinyin: Yóutáng
Yue: Cantonese
- Yale Romanization: Yàutòng
- IPA: [jɐw˩tʰɔŋ˩]
- Jyutping: jau^{4} tong^{4}

General information
- Location: Cha Kwo Ling Road, Yau Tong; Kwun Tong District, Hong Kong
- Coordinates: 22°17′52″N 114°14′14″E
- System: MTR rapid transit station
- Owner: MTR Corporation
- Operator: MTR Corporation
- Lines: Kwun Tong line; Tseung Kwan O line
- Platforms: 4 (2 island platforms)
- Tracks: 4
- Connections: Bus, minibus

Construction
- Structure type: At-grade/Underground
- Platform levels: 2
- Accessible: Yes

Other information
- Station code: YAT

History
- Opened: 4 August 2002; 24 years ago

Services
Preceding station	MTR	Following station
Lam Tin towards Whampoa	Kwun Tong line	Tiu Keng Leng Terminus
Quarry Bay towards North Point	Tseung Kwan O line	Tiu Keng Leng towards Po Lam or LOHAS Park
Transfer at Yau Tong East
Lam Tin North towards Choi Hung East	East Kowloon line transfer at Yau Tong East	Terminus
Track layout
U2 (upper level)
U1 (lower level)
Location
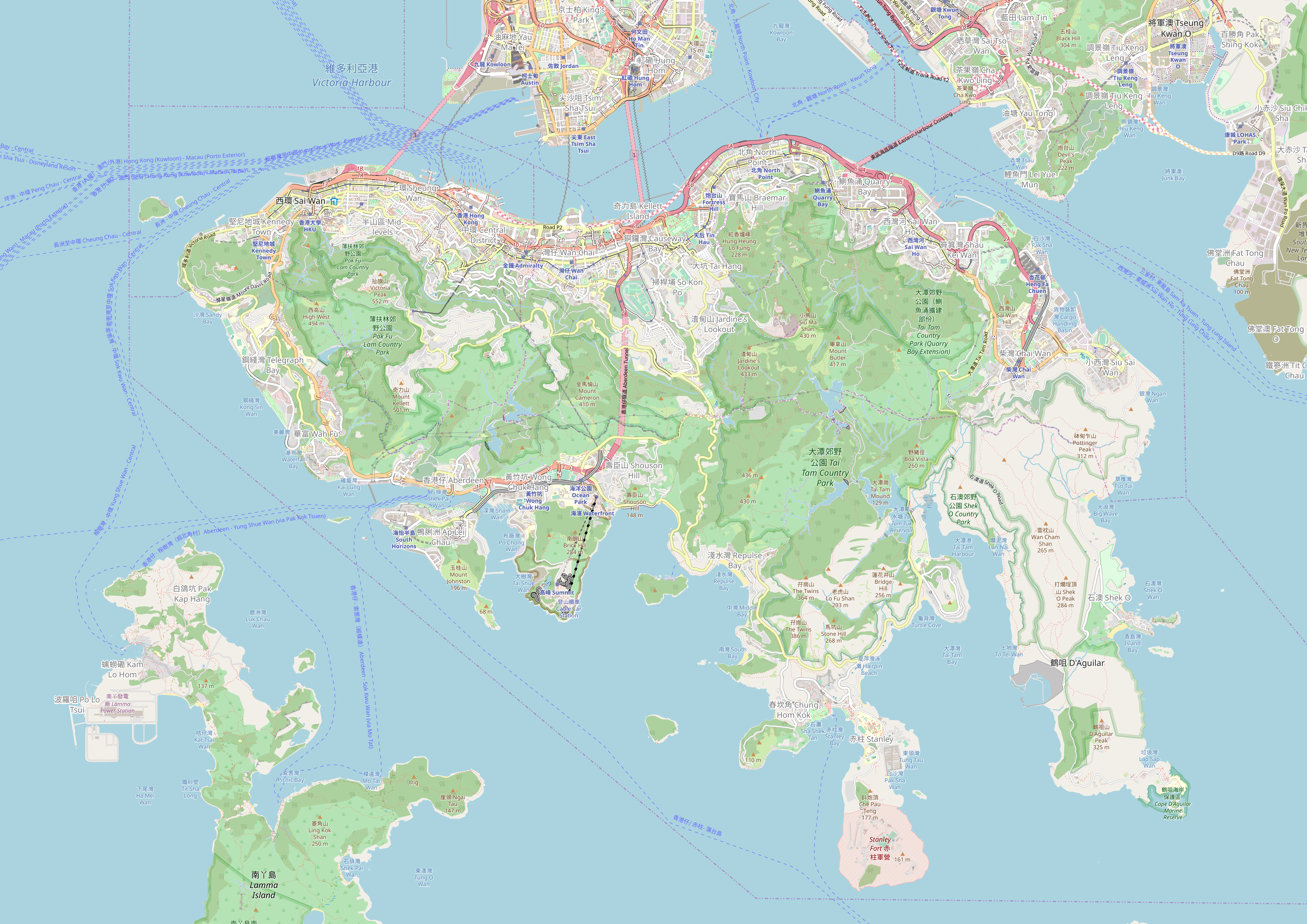
- Location within MTR Location within Hong Kong Island

Yau Tong (Chinese: 油塘; Jyutping: jau^{4} tong^{4}; Cantonese Yale: Yàutòng) is a station on the Hong Kong MTR Kwun Tong line and the Tseung Kwan O line. It is the only station of the Tseung Kwan O line located in Kowloon. The livery of the station is golden yellow.

The train platforms are constructed above ground level, which are sealed from the outside with concrete walls to prevent the noise of trains disturbing the nearby residents of Yau Tong Estate.

== History ==
Yau Tong station was originally built as a part of the MTR Tseung Kwan O extension to make a cross-platform interchange between Kwun Tong line and the newly built Tseung Kwan O line, and to provide nearby residents in Lei Yue Mun and Sze Shan (Chinese: 四山; lit. 'Mount Four') convenient access to the MTR system. The construction project was awarded to Kumagai Gumi and was valued at HK$457 million.

There was discussions over whether the interchange should be built in a new station by redirecting the original route, or by utilising existing stations such as Lam Tin or Kwun Tong. Ultimately the interchanges were built in two new stations, Yau Tong and Tiu Keng Leng. This resulted in certain routings needing to change trains twice when crossing the Victoria Harbour.

The station opened on 4 August 2002. The new station extended travel times between Lam Tin and Quarry Bay by four minutes.

The station was built without public toilets, like most other MTR stations at the time. New toilets and a babycare room were commissioned at the station on 29 May 2019.

== Station layout ==
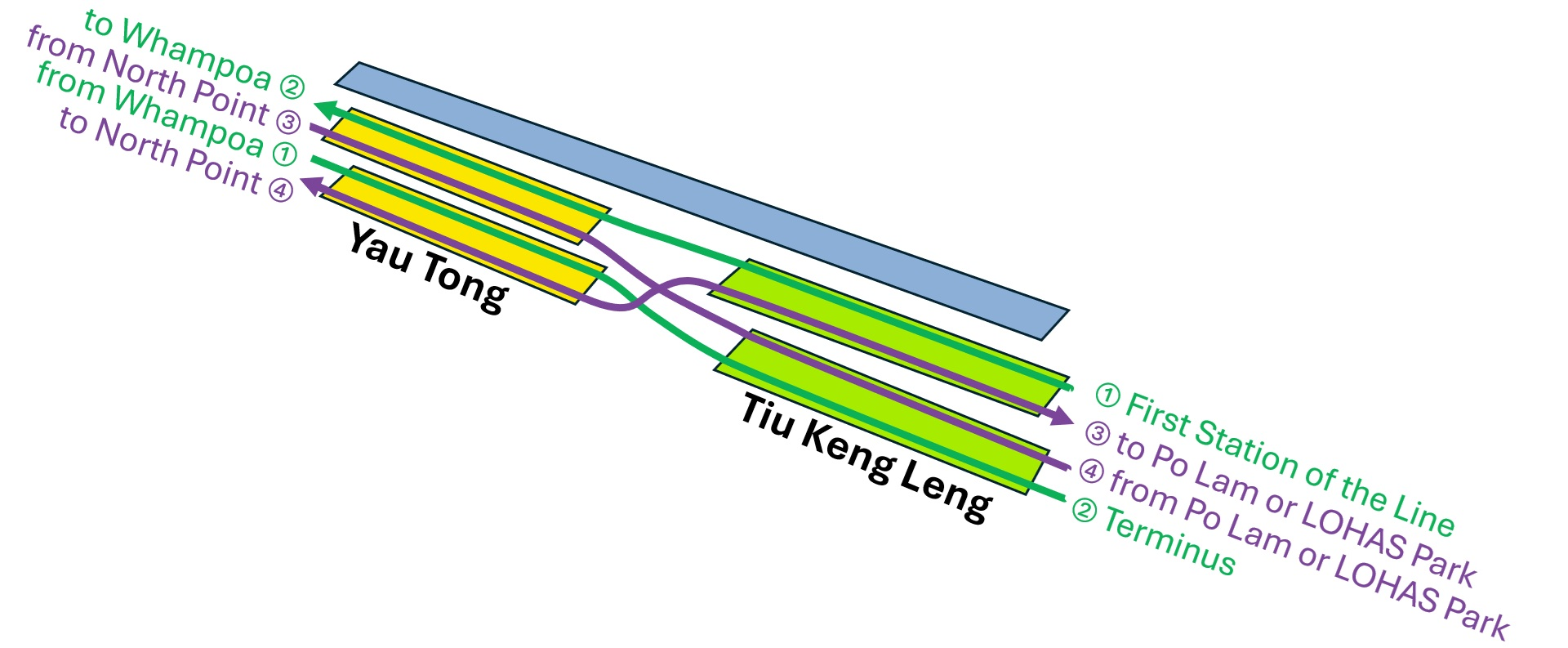
Three-level interchange at Tiu Keng Leng and Yau Tong stations

The multiple cross-platform-interchange system between Tiu Keng Leng and Yau Tong stations

Yau Tong station has three main levels: the concourse, the upper platforms, and the lower platforms.

The upper platform level consists of Platforms 2 and 3. Passengers crossing the harbour on the Tseung Kwan O line towards the Kowloon side can cross over to Platform 2 to change to the Kwun Tong line to get to most destinations in East Kowloon.

The lower platform level contains Platforms 1 and 4. Passengers travelling on the Kwun Tong line travelling towards Tiu Keng Leng can cross over to Platform 4 to change to the Tseung Kwan O line to cross the harbour to North Point.

U4; Concourse	Concourse	Exits, footbridge to Yau Tong Estate/Lei Yue Mun Plaza
U4; Concourse	Concourse	Customer Service, MTR Shops
U4; Concourse	Concourse	Vending machines, ATMs
U2; Upper platforms	Platform 2	← Kwun Tong line towards Whampoa (Lam Tin)
U2; Upper platforms	Island platform, doors will open on the left
U2; Upper platforms	Platform 3	Tseung Kwan O line towards Po Lam or LOHAS Park (Tiu Keng Leng) →
U1; Lower platforms	Platform 1	Kwun Tong line towards Tiu Keng Leng (Terminus) →
U1; Lower platforms	Island platform, doors will open on the right
U1; Lower platforms	Platform 4	← Tseung Kwan O line towards North Point (Quarry Bay)
G	Exits	Exit A2, B2

=== Entrances and exits ===
- A1: Yau Tong Estate, Domain, Lei Yue Mun Plaza, Lei Yue Mun Estate, Tseung Kwan O Chinese Permanent Cemetery, public transport interchange
- A2: Lei Yue Mun Municipal Services Building, Jockey Club Lei Yue Mun Plus
- B1: Yau Lai Estate, St. Antonius Primary School
- B2: Cha Kwo Ling Road
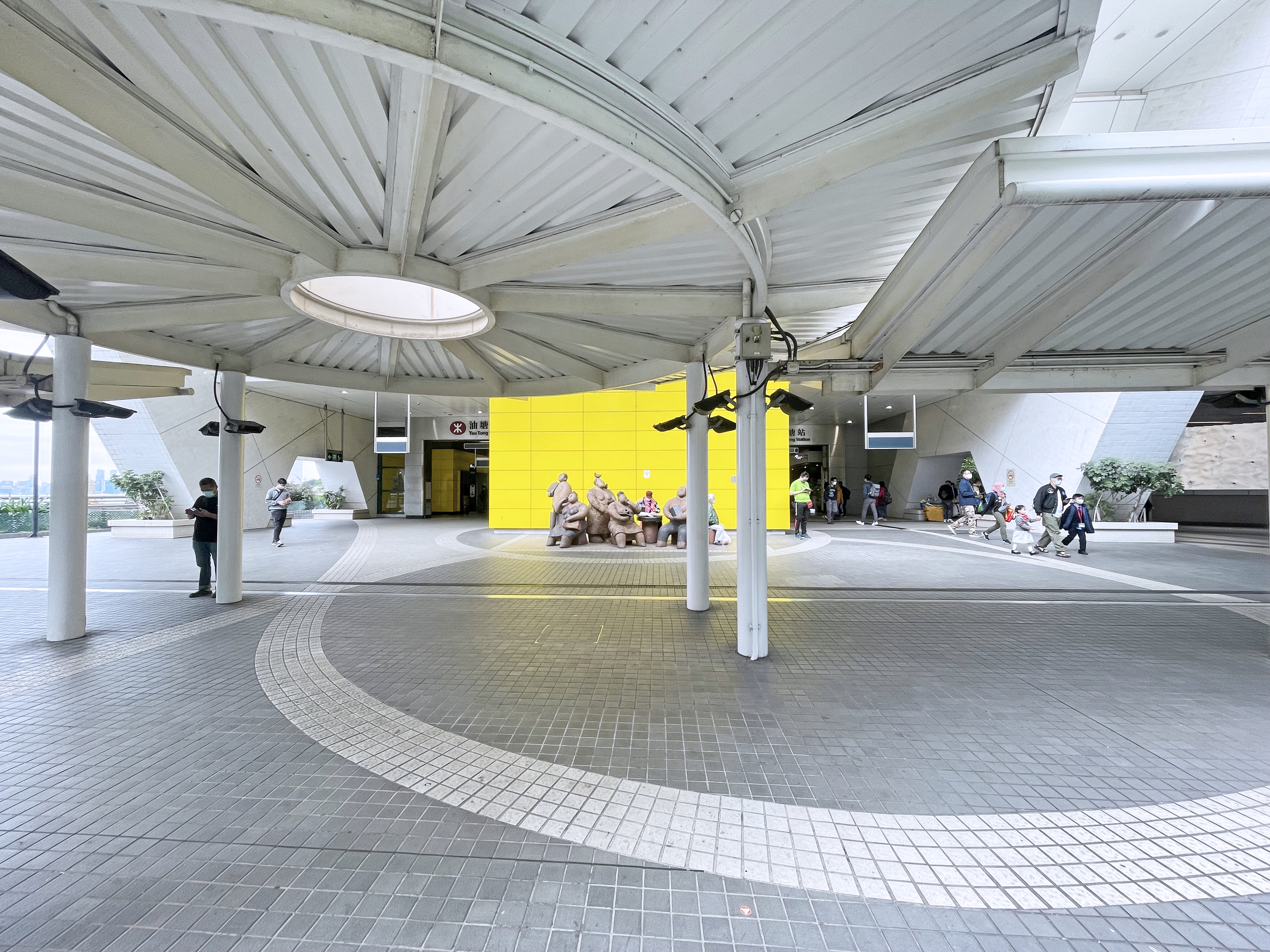
Exits A1 and A2

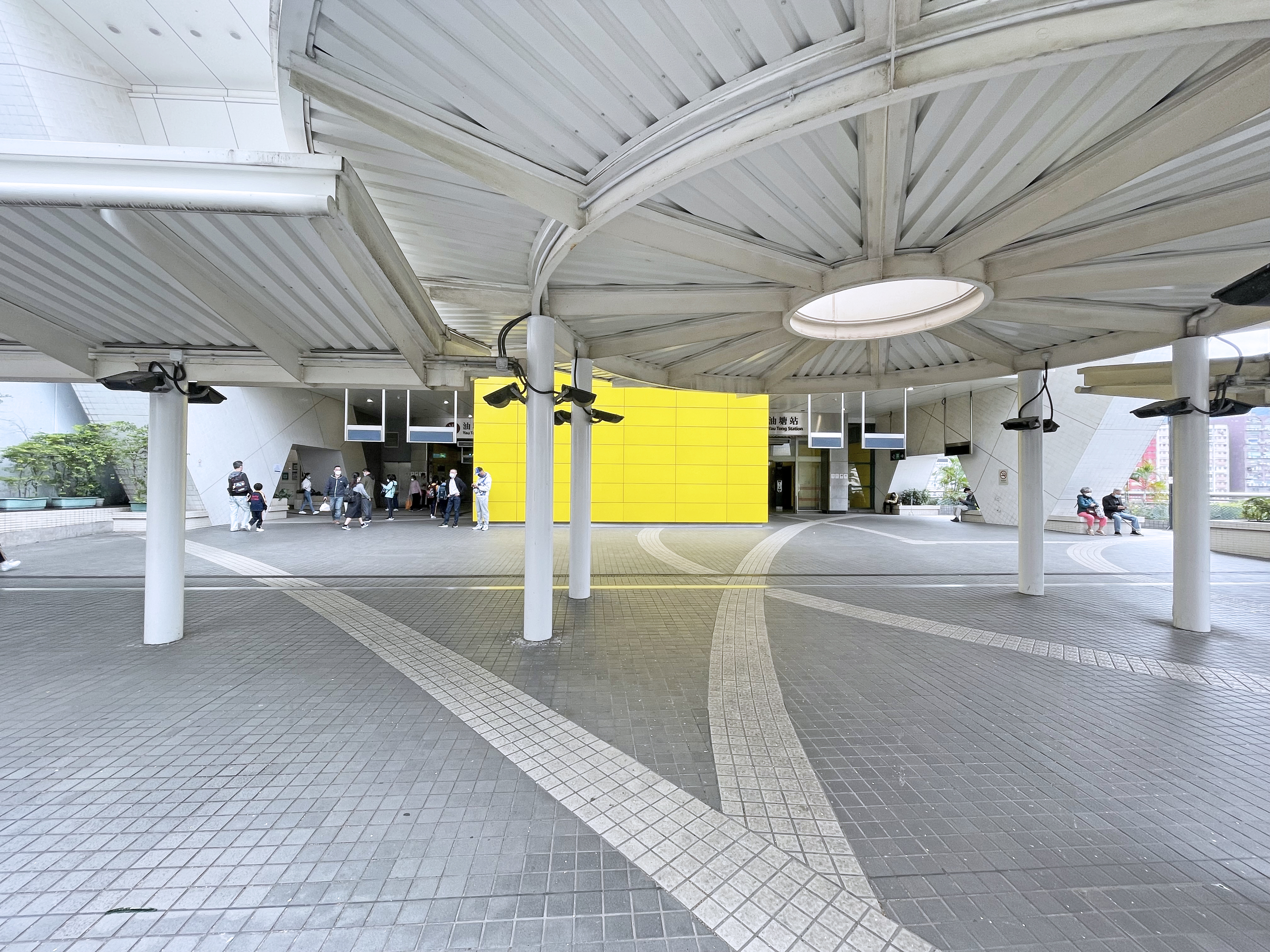
Exit B1 and B2

== Nearby facilities ==
A new shopping centre, Domain, opened on in 2012. It was the second shopping mall in Yau Tong. The first one was Lei Yue Mun Plaza, which opened in 2001.

On 2 July 2012, Yau Tong Public Transport Interchange was opened; bus and public light bus routes serving the previous Yau Tong Station Temporary Bus Terminus were moved to the new location. The transport interchange can be accessed via exit A2.
