= Yau Tong Estate =

Public housing estate in Yau Tong, Hong Kong

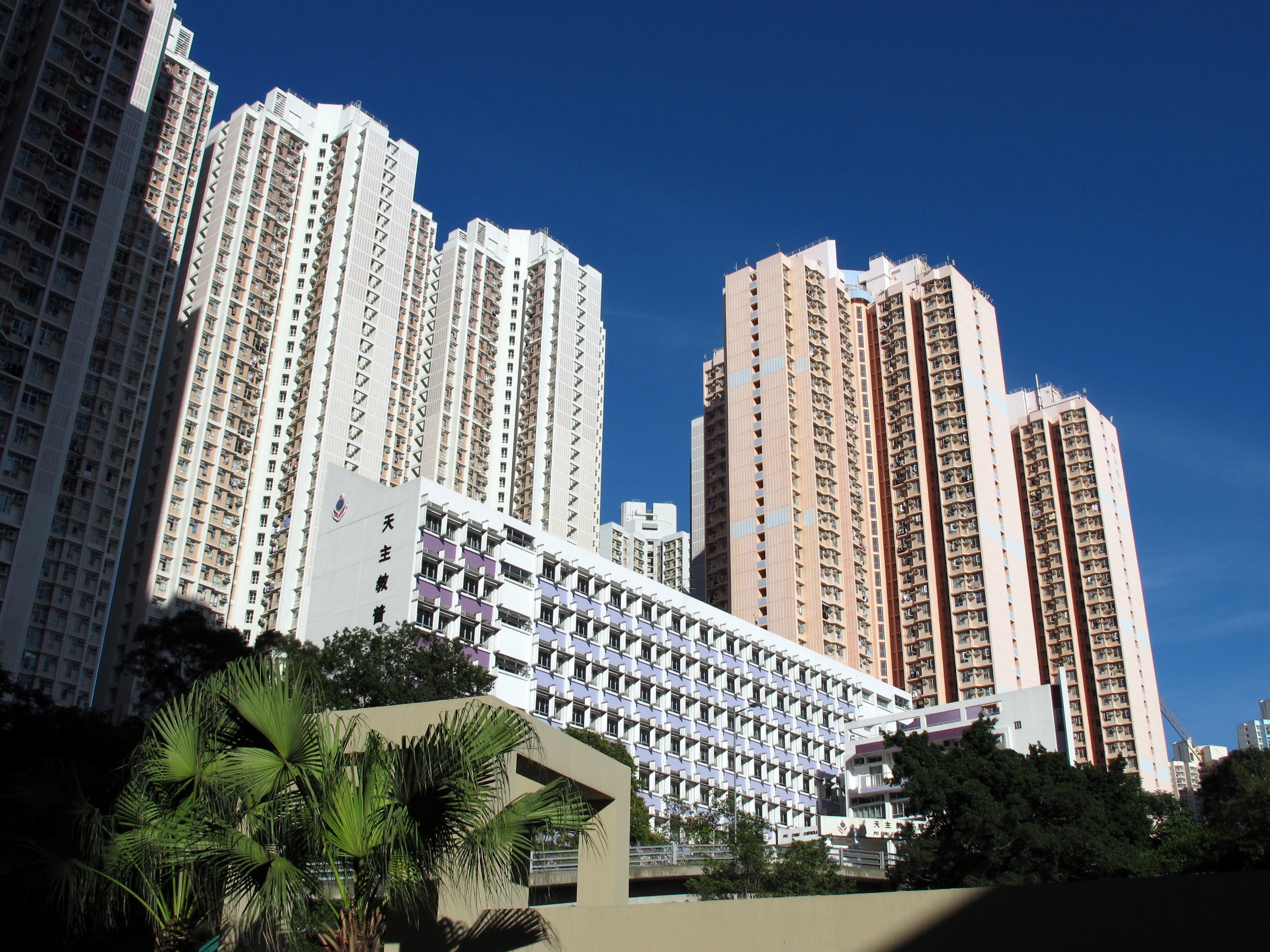
- Yau Tong Estate
- Interactive map of Yau Tong Estate

General information
- Location: Yau Tong, Kwun Tong, Kowloon, Hong Kong
- Coordinates: 22.2998°N 114.2377°E
- Status: Completed
- Category: Public rental housing
- Area: 175–578 ft^{2}
- Population: 10,100
- No. of blocks: 5
- No. of units: 3,600

Construction
- Constructed: 2000; 26 years ago, 2002; 24 years ago
- Authority: Hong Kong Housing Authority

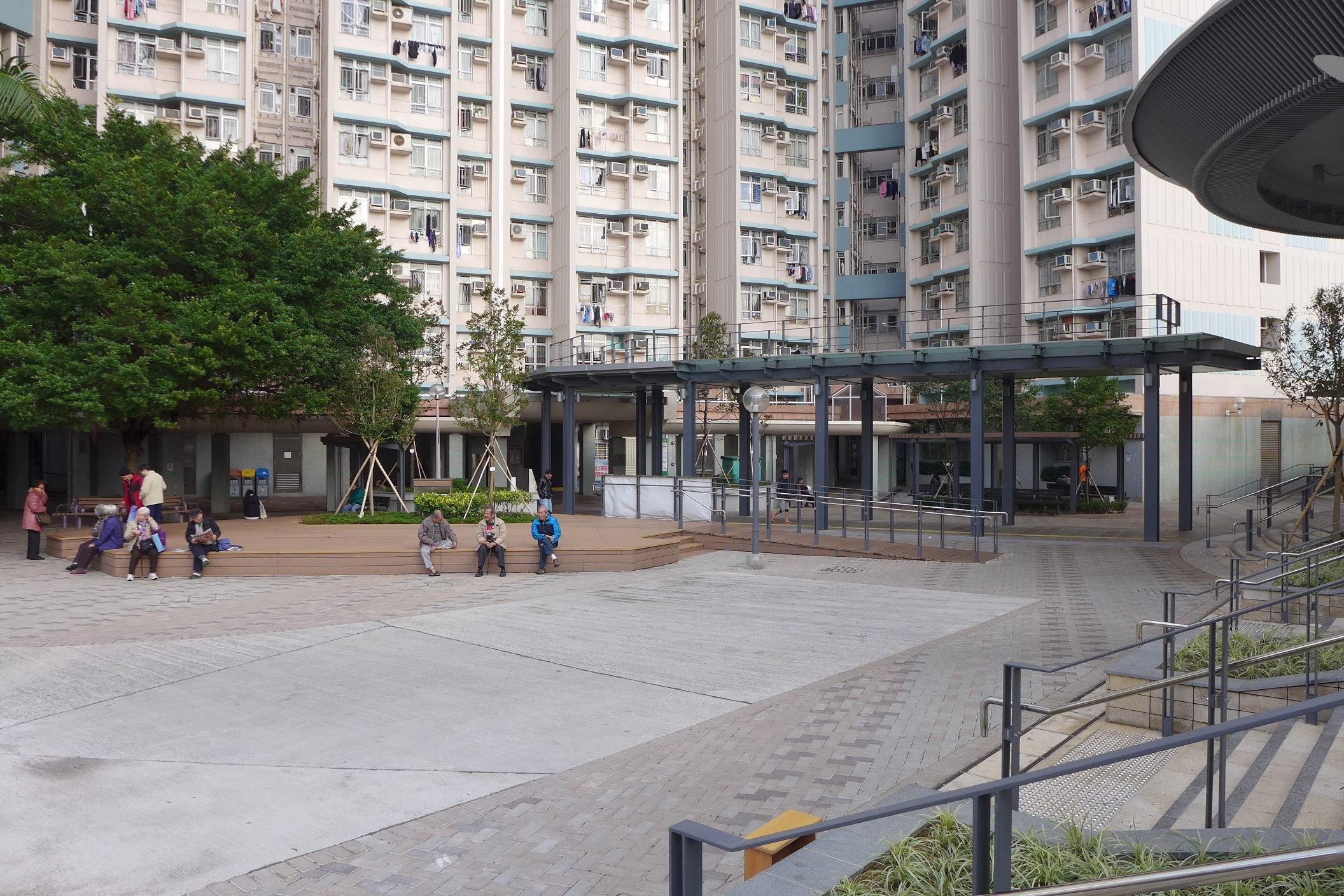
Yau Tong Estate Entry Plaza

Yau Tong Estate (Chinese: 油塘邨) is a public housing estate in Yau Tong, Kwun Tong, Kowloon, Hong Kong, located near Yau Tong station of the MTR.

== Background ==
Yau Tong Estate was a resettlement estate with 23 blocks built in 1964, 1965 and 1971 respectively, all of which were demolished in the 1990s. The estate was originally redeveloped in phases. However, the airport relocation and MTR Tseung Kwan O line construction caused delays in the redevelopment project. In the end, nearly all blocks were demolished at one time in the late 1990s, rather than by phases.

After redevelopment, four blocks were built in 2000 and 2002 respectively. In 2002, Ching Mei House (Block A) of Yau Mei Court was converted from Home Ownership Scheme to rental housing, and renamed Mei Tong House.

== Houses ==
Name	Type	Completion	Stories	Units per floor	Units
Fu Tong House	Harmony 1	2000	37	20	740
Kwai Tong House	Harmony 1	2000	37	20	740
Wing Tong House	Harmony 1	2002	40	20	800
Wah Tong House	Harmony 1	2002	40	24	960
Mei Tong House	New Cruciform Block (Ver.1999)	2002	40	10	400

== See also ==
- Yau Mei Court and Yau Chui Court
- Public housing estates in Yau Tong
