= Yau Tong =

Area of Hong Kong

Coordinates: 22°17′51″N 114°14′19″E

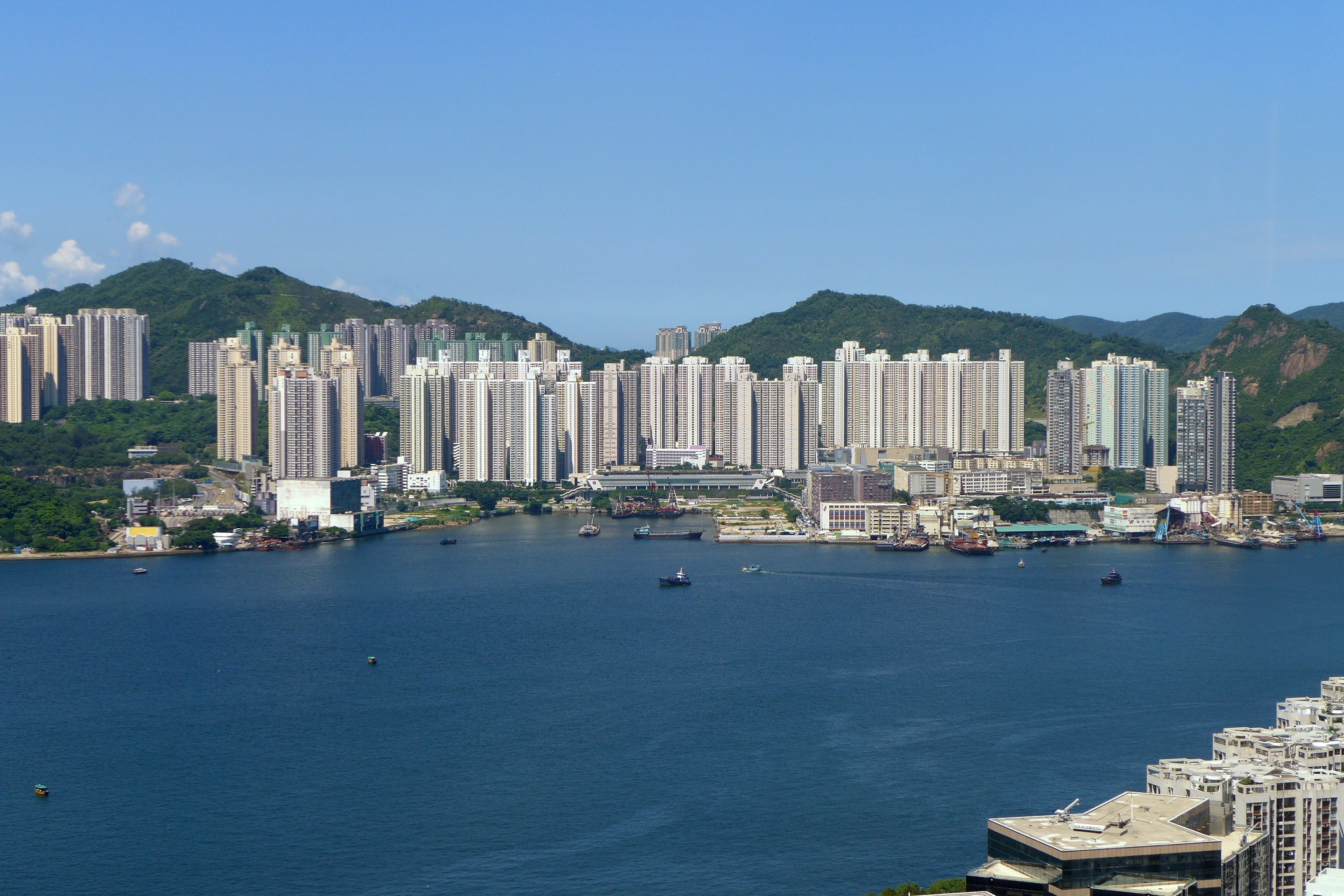
Yau Tong viewed from Hong Kong Island. Taken in July 2014.

Yau Tong (Chinese: 油塘; Jyutping: jau4 tong4; pinyin: Yóutáng) is an area of Hong Kong, located in the southeastern end of Kowloon, between Lei Yue Mun and Lam Tin, at the east shore of Victoria Harbour, west of Tseung Kwan O. Administratively, it is part of Kwun Tong District, the most densely populated district in Hong Kong.

The northern part of Yau Tong is mainly residential, consisting of public housing, while the sea-facing location in the south is mainly used for industrial development. The southern area has been planned by the government as a private residential area, but there are still sporadic industrial buildings.

Yau Tong is served by the MTR station Yau Tong station. This station is on the eastern end of the Kwun Tong line and the Tseung Kwan O line, and therefore serves as an interchange point for travelling to and from Kowloon and Hong Kong Island.

== Etymology ==
The name "Yau Tong" literally means "oil pond" in Cantonese. It was once known as 游塘, a homophone, which simply meant "pond". The English transliteration was first recorded in 1924 on a map on Devil's Peak by the government's military department.

In the Hong Kong Annual Report of 1963, two different names were used on two separate maps. The two names were "Ma Yau Tong" and "Yau Tong"; Ma Yau Tong was written on the reclamation bay, while Yau Tong was used on the zoning boundary. However, the text in the book only mentions Yau Tong, saying that the local area is only used for ship repairing and shipbuilding purposes. Because of its near-shore water storage, the government sold land to wood mills. These are special cases of political planning at that time.

The origin of "Ma Yau Tong" is disputed. One possible origin is "馬游塘", meaning "horse pond", named after a village of the same name on Lam Tin Mountain; However, the two places are not close.

== History ==
Yau Tong was largely undeveloped before 1940, and was considered a rural or suburban area. In the 1950s, an oil depot was built in Cha Kwo Ling, north of Yau Tong. In the 1960s, Yau Tong was zoned as a public housing estate along the Lei Yue Mun Road by the Hong Kong government. In 1964, a number of public housing estates such as Yau Tong Estate and Ko Chiu Road Estate were built. There was an industrial zone along the coast.

The Eastern Harbour Crossing was opened in 1989, while Yau Tong station itself opened on 4 August 2002, along with the Tseung Kwan O line in which it is included on the same date. The increase of transport and rail links improved the connectivity of Yau Tong with Kowloon, Hong Kong Island, and the rest of Hong Kong.

== Shopping ==
Yau Tong has several shopping centres. Lei Yue Mun Plaza was opened in 2001 on Lei Yue Mun Road. It is located near the MTR station. Subsequently, two more shopping centres have opened. Yau Lai Shopping Centre (油麗商場) is connected to Exit B of Yau Tong station and mainly serves residents of Yau Lai Estate.

=== Lei Yue Mun Plaza ===
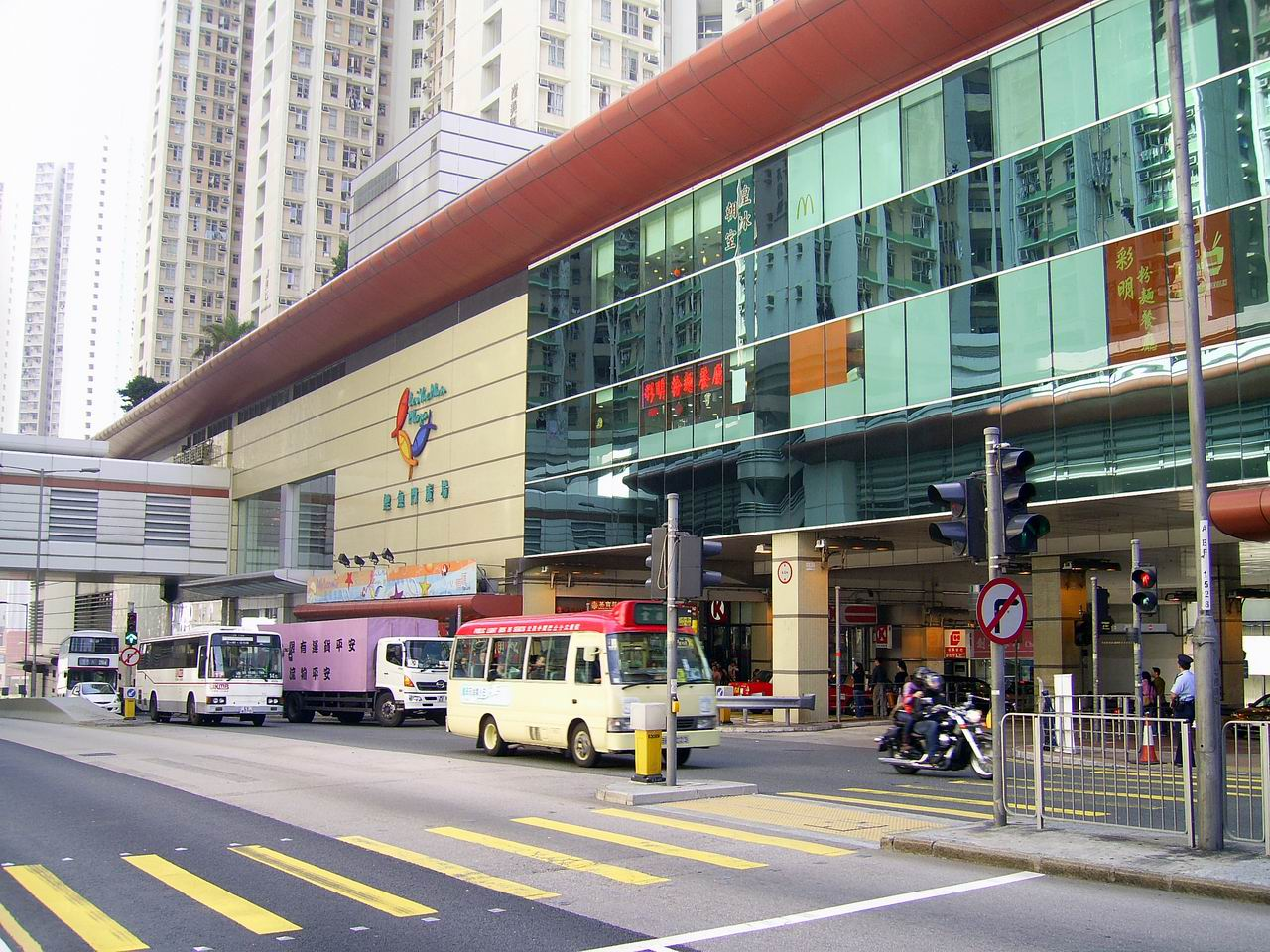
The mall seen from Lei Yue Mun Road in March 2008

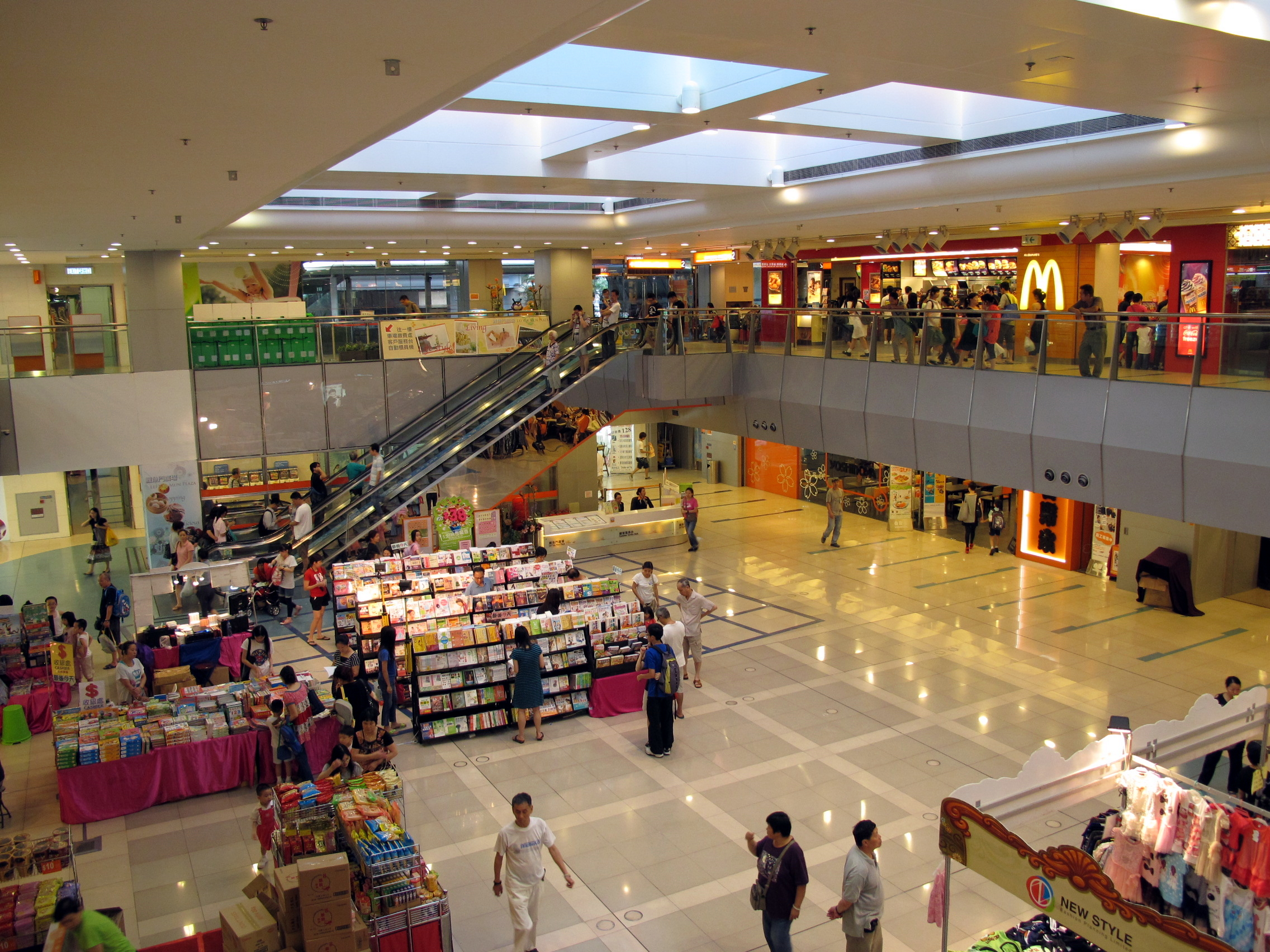
Lei Yue Mun Plaza atrium in June 2011.

Lei Yue Mun Plaza (Chinese: 鯉魚門廣場) is a shopping centre in Yau Tong, on the southeastern side of Kwun Tong District, Kowloon, Hong Kong. Its name comes from the nearby Lei Yue Mun channel and the surrounding area in Yau Tong, also called 'Lei Yue Mun'.

At the time of its completion, Lei Yue Mun Plaza was the largest mall by floor space in Yau Tong. Lei Yue Mun Plaza is connected physically to Domain through a series of bridges, allowing visitors to traverse between them easily. The mall is located above exit A1 of Yau Tong station on the Kwun Tong line of the MTR, and is easily accessible from there.

==== History ====
Lei Yue Mun Plaza was developed as part of a masterplan around the development of the fifth phase of Yau Tong Estate. The development of Lei Yue Mun Plaza was managed by the Hong Kong Housing Authority. The shopping centre was originally planned to be developed in two phases. However, the property rights to the first phase were given to the Link Real Estate Investment Trust. The plaza opened in 2001. The Housing Authority retained rights to the second phase of the project, in what would later become Domain.

Disney's Magical Moments, co-produced by the Walt Disney Company (Asia Pacific) Limited and the Hong Kong Housing Authority ran from 21 December 2002 to 5 January 2003. The event was the largest function held by the HKHA to this date, networking 131 of the HKHA's shopping centres. Four shopping malls were decorated with large sets and models that served as stages for Disney characters: Stanley Plaza, Tsz Wan Shan Shopping Centre, Lok Fu Shopping Centre and Lei Yue Mun Plaza.

==== Design ====
The plaza consists of three floors, including the ground floor. The main exhibition venues are located in the 1st floor, above the ground floor. The plaza has a floor area of around 5,600 square meters. A market for fresh food is available on the ground floor.

Bridges on both the first and second floors allow connections to neighbouring Domain. More bridges from the first floor connect to nearby housing estates.

===== Logo =====
The logo for the mall consists of three fish, referencing the fishing industry practiced in Lei Yue Mun, and the names of the shopping centre in Chinese and English.

==== Tenants ====
In 2016, 57% of the shops in Lei Yue Mun Plaza were chain stores.

=== Domain ===
Domain, opened on 29 September 2012, is connected to Exit A of Yau Tong station, and is the largest one owned by Hong Kong Housing Authority. It serves about 80,000 people in the area.

== Future development ==
The Town Planning Board intends to phase out industrial operations and optimize the waterfront for public enjoyment. Several factory buildings in Yau Tong Bay have been demolished.

== Public housing estates ==
- Yau Tong Estate
- Yau Mei Court
- Lei Yue Mun Estate
- Yau Lai Estate
- Ko Yee Estate
- Ko Cheung Court

== Features ==
Section 3 of The Wilson Trail begins at Yau Tong near Devil's Peak. It is possible to access the fort on the Peak on foot from the Wilson Trail.

== Education ==
Yau Tong is in Primary One Admission (POA) School Net 48. Within the school net are multiple aided schools (operated independently but funded with government money) and Kwun Tong Government Primary School.

== Transportation ==
=== Main road network ===
- Lei Yue Mun Road
- Cha Kwo Ling Road
- Ko Chiu Road
- Eastern Harbour Crossing

== Nearby districts ==
- Ma Yau Tong
- Kwun Tong District
- Lam Tin
- Lei Yue Mun
- Cha Kwo Ling
- Tiu Keng Leng

== See also ==
- Junk Bay
- Kowloon
- Kwun Tong District
- Yau Tong station
- Yau Mei Court and Yau Chui Court
