= Revitalisation of industrial buildings in Hong Kong =

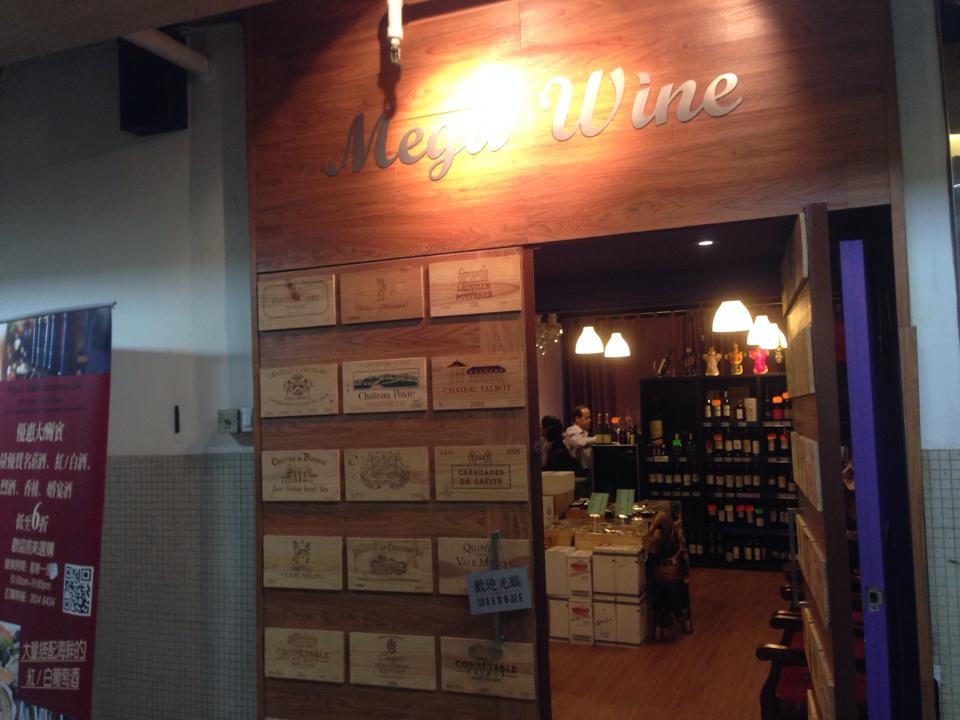
Wine shop in an industrial building in Kwun Tong.

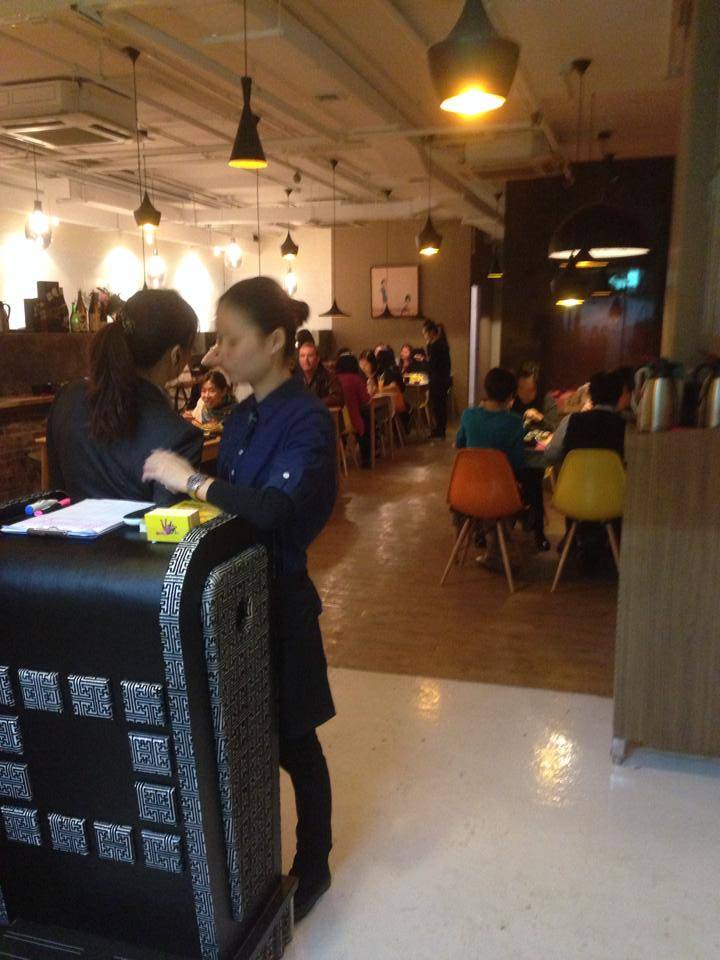
Japanese restaurant

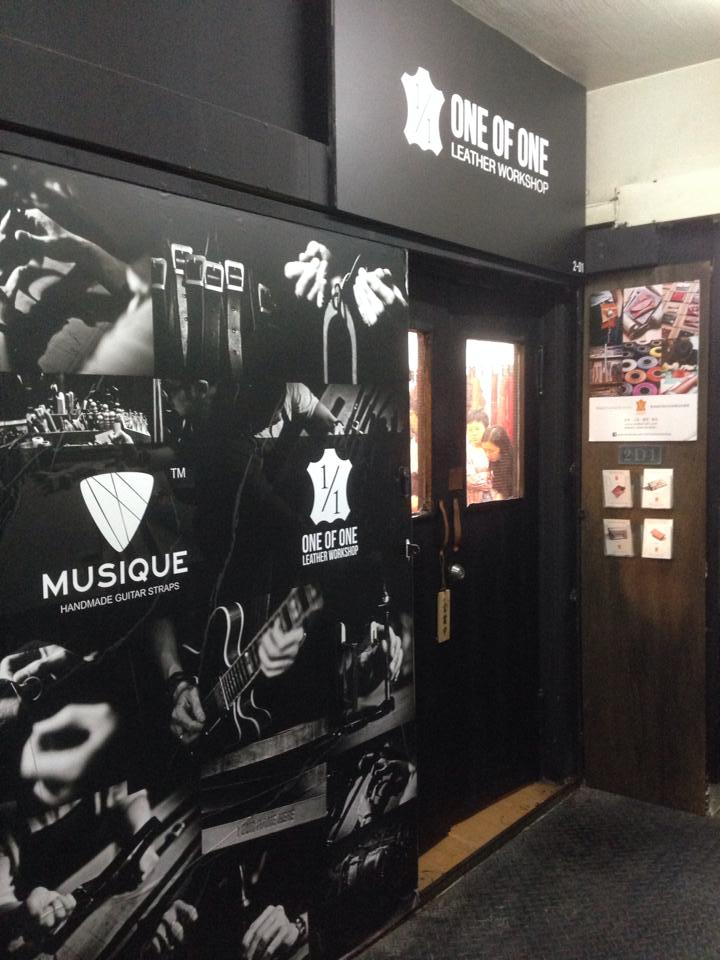
Leather Workshop in an industrial building in Kwun Tong.

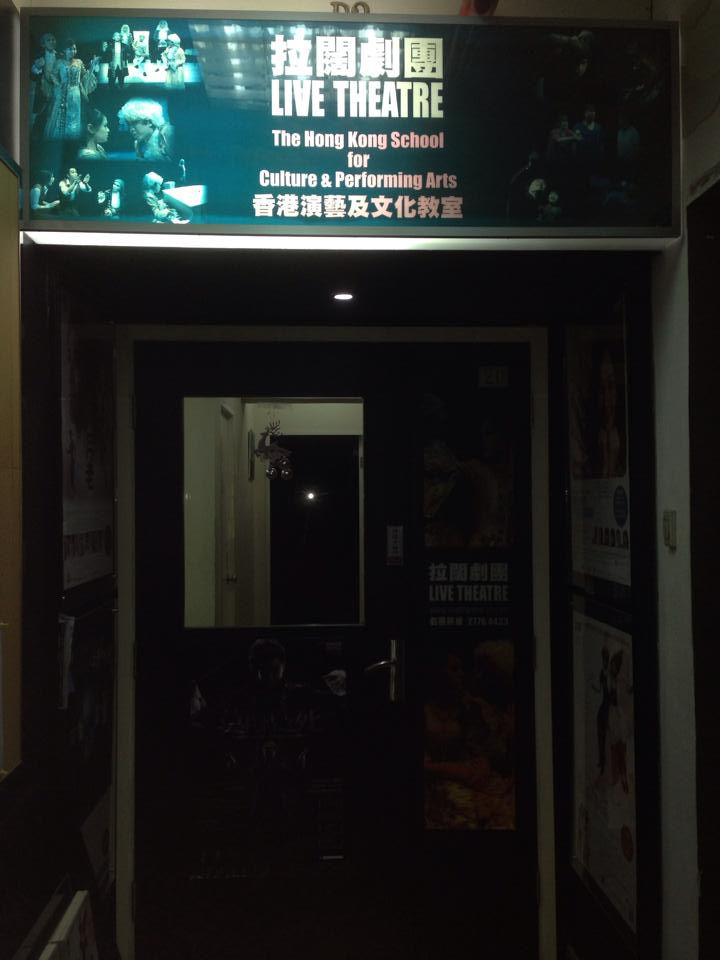
Performing Arts Theatre

The scheme of revitalisation of industrial buildings was announced by the Government of Hong Kong in the 2009-2010 Policy address of Hong Kong. The aims of the scheme is to provide more floor spaces for suitable uses in order to meet Hong Kong’s changing social and economical needs. It aims to redevelop unused and affordable industrial buildings into space for new businesses, especially for the "six pillar industries". (Note: Regarding the "six pillar industries", from Developing the Infrastructure for Economic Growth: Hong Kong enjoys clear advantages, namely, education services, medical services, testing and certification, innovation and technology, cultural and creative industries, and environmental industries.)

The scheme was implemented since April 1, 2010. There was a mid-term review of the scheme in September 2011. Afterwards, the deadline for submission of applications was extended from March 31, 2013 to March 31, 2016.

== Objectives ==
The project has three main measures:

- Lower the ownership application threshold for compulsory sale for redevelopment from 90% to 80%.
- Give owners options to pay for the assessed land premium by financing at a fixed rate of 2% over five years.
- Create a tailor-made lease modification which provides land premium based on their most suitable use.

The government continues to provide art space at favorable industrial premises. From 2010 to 2013, 13 applications for redevelopment and 49 for wholesale conversion have been approved and it has supplied about 680,000 square meters of non-industrial use area.

== Background ==
The revitalisation of industrial buildings has been in progress in areas under the urban renewal project. For instance, Kwun Tong, Sham Shui Po and Kwai Chung . There are several reasons, leading to the change of landuse and the start of the scheme. These include the evolving economy, the rental prices and prices of purchasing offices had tremendously increased in the past decades, leading to the winding down of traditional manufacturing industries. Under numerous circumstances, especially because of the economic factors as mentioned, many factories were relocated to Mainland China. As a result, many industrial buildings have become vacant or under-utilised. The vacancy rate of industrial buildings was 6.7% in December 2007 indicating that there was a waste of valuable land resources in the area. In order to solve this problem and better utilize resources, a re-allocation of resources was needed. Thus, the Lands Department implemented the conversion of industrial buildings to other uses. Different kinds of businesses have been set up in these buildings and has become prosperous. Since these buildings are geographically and economically favourable to different businesses. This made the conversion more efficient and created job opportunities. Revitalisation of industrial buildings is obviously cost-effective and beneficial to owners and labours in Hong Kong.

== Implementation process ==
In September 2014, there were in total 100 approved applications under the revitalization measures. There are two kinds of applications in this scheme, namely wholesale conversion and redevelopment. The applications of redevelopment are mainly located in Kwun Tong, Kwai Chung, Cheung Sha Wan, Yau Tong and Wong Chuk Hang while the first two places are at the same time for wholesale conversion. The uses for the industrial buildings have become more diversified.

== Types of businesses ==
Industrial buildings are located broadly throughout Hong Kong and there are varying concentrations of types of businesses. They can be mainly classified within the following commercial sectors: food, entertainment, sports and arts. The following are some examples of clustering:

- Kwun Tong: movie post-production offices and music studios
- San Po Kong: performing arts stages
- Chai Wan: photo studios
- Fo Tan: visual arts studios

Other types of businesses include sports (e.g. skiing, snowboard, baseball, softball and football facilities), creative arts workshops (e.g. leather workshop, painting, sculpture, music), restaurants and farms (e.g. aquatic farm and hydroponics plantation).

=== Food ===
Since the rent has gone up sharply in Hong Kong, many restaurants have started to operate their own businesses in the industrial buildings, especially underground restaurants, which is a kind of home catering that features unique recipes. These particular kind of restaurants mainly promote tranquility eating environments, which are suited to the isolated environment of the industrial buildings. Cooking classes are also held in these enormous spaces. In addition, in order to meet these current trends, the industrial buildings attract a lot of organic food laboratories and resellers. The large-scale environment is ample for the business owners to obtain large machines to breed seafood and plant organic vegetables.

=== Entertainment ===
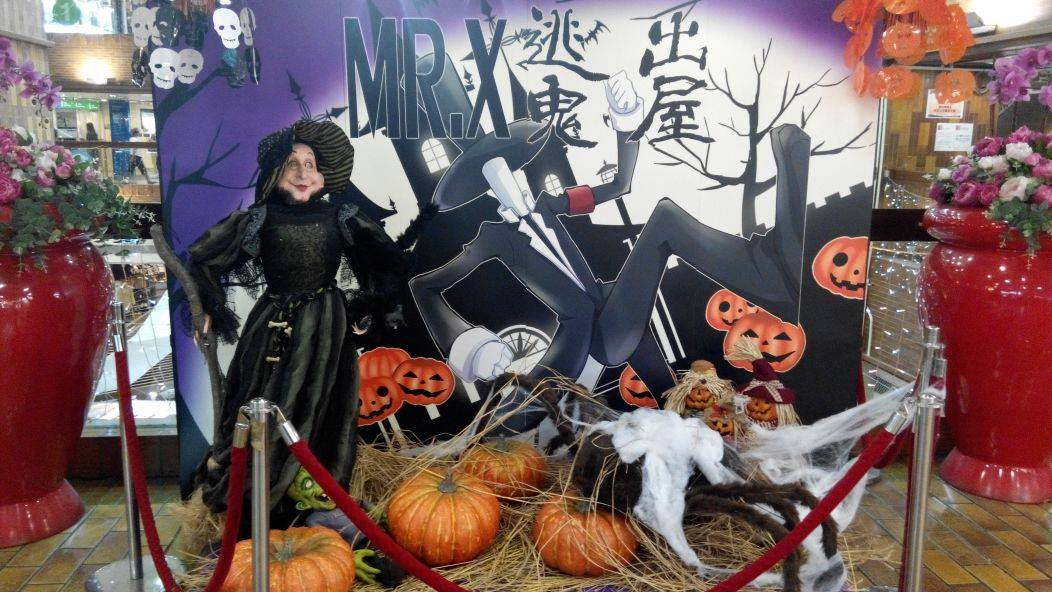
Escaping games found in Hung Hom

For babies and toddlers, there are customized playgrounds for play. Birthday parties are frequently held with educational games catering for infants. For teenagers, ghost houses and escaping games are slightly offbeat venues for gatherings. For adults, wine cellars are also a place for people to pursue the quality of life. People can taste wines and even DIY own wines.

=== Sports ===
Sports activities can commonly be found inside revitalised industrial buildings in Hong Kong, examples include: golf, archery and martial arts. Fitness centres have gained favourable reception by Hong Kong people as well. Unlike some existing sports clubs, sports activities in revitalised industrial buildings are mass-oriented. Customers can enjoy the fun of doing sports at the same time with a relatively lower cost. This interests not only sports lovers but also families that bring their kids to take part in leisure activities.

=== Arts ===
Despite the fact that Hong Kong is often referred to as a ‘Cultural Desert’, the development of art is thriving in revitalised industrial buildings. Art studios, workshops and music studios became ‘must-have’ items in those buildings. Painting sessions and free art-jamming are offered to people who wanted to escape their busy life and be immersed in tranquility. On the other hand, workshops for leather-making or other hand-made products are provided so that people can showcase their creativity. From the musical perspective, customers can have opportunities to create music and jam, and enjoy band performances. For example, there are live houses in Kwun Tong industrial area that provides performance venue for local singers and bands.

== Limitations ==
=== Security ===
After the launch of the revitalization scheme, owners can apply to the Lands Department for changing its usage of his premises. The department has insufficient monitoring of these industrial buildings after the approval. Different varieties of businesses like holiday inns, arts studios and sport centres are developed making the department hard to control. Some owners develop businesses via this administrative loophole, running cubicles, casinos and mahjong clubs, creating many security problems for the building. Triad societies and gang activities may immerse in these buildings and may affect public order . Some cubicles have poor fire control facilities and have the potential to cause injuries and death when a fire breakout.

=== Low incentive for owners ===
Many owners of industrial buildings are reluctant to carry out revitalization. Firstly, due to the location and environment of the premises, for instance, no windows or sunlight hinders the transformation of buildings for other business purposes such as inns and hotels. Secondly, owners have to bear the huge cost for revitalization, so they may illegally to choose to make unauthorized changes to their industrial buildings for commercial use to save cost. Thirdly, the scope of the new businesses is limited, as it is hard for people to know the existence of the shops and thus requires a large advertising cost, which hinders the expansion of the businesses. Therefore, many owners prefer to leave buildings vacant rather than taking costly and time-consuming action for revitalization.

== Impact ==
=== Positive impact ===
Providing land for various land uses

Considering that land space in Hong Kong is scarce in relation to its population, continuous development is needed to keep up with growth. To manage the need for commercial and residential space, old industrial buildings are being converted into offices, residential areas, hotels and other uses. This is also especially useful for cultural and creative industries that may require large commercial space. The Jockey Club Creative Arts Centre (JCCAC) is an example. The building renovated for JCCAC was a factory estate in Shek Kip Mei, which has been abandoned since the 1990s. It was converted into an arts centre for cultural development, and it has work space for more than 100 artists and arts groups. Additionally, it is cheaper and fast to renovate old buildings is faster than constructing new ones.

Minimising construction waste and costs

Revitalizing old industrial buildings prevents demolition, minimizing construction waste and land pollution.

=== Negative impact ===
Increase in rental fee

The Policy of Revitalizing industrial buildings resulted in an increase in rental fees, increasing the rateable value 2% in 2012 and 7% in 2013. A survey conducted in 2010 by the Hong Kong Arts Development Council (HKADC) showed that over 60% of industrial buildings users had problems as a result of rental increases. The average increase was 14%. According to the recent survey proposed by HKADC, among 800 arts groups renting space in industrial buildings, 61.5% stated that they were facing an increase in rental fee, which poses a financial threat to arts groups who have unstable income. Their rental fee, including cost of installing air conditioners and other equipment, accounts, for the largest part of their expenses. Some arts groups or arts practitioners choose to relocate from the old industrial buildings as a result.

Limitations on current Land Use Policy

In accordance with the Hong Kong Development Bureau town planning laws, cultural and creative industries (e.g. information technology, design and media production office, audio-visual recording studio, etc.) are allowed in these two zones. Nonetheless, Ms Leung Po Shan, the spokesperson of the Factory Artists Concern Group (FAC) stated that drama groups were not allowed to rent in factories.

== See also ==
- Public factory estates in Hong Kong
- Manufacturing in Hong Kong
- Adaptive reuse
- Heritage conservation in Hong Kong
