= Jordan Valley Factory Estate =

Former industrial buildings in Hong Kong

Coordinates: 22.323053°N 114.216742°E

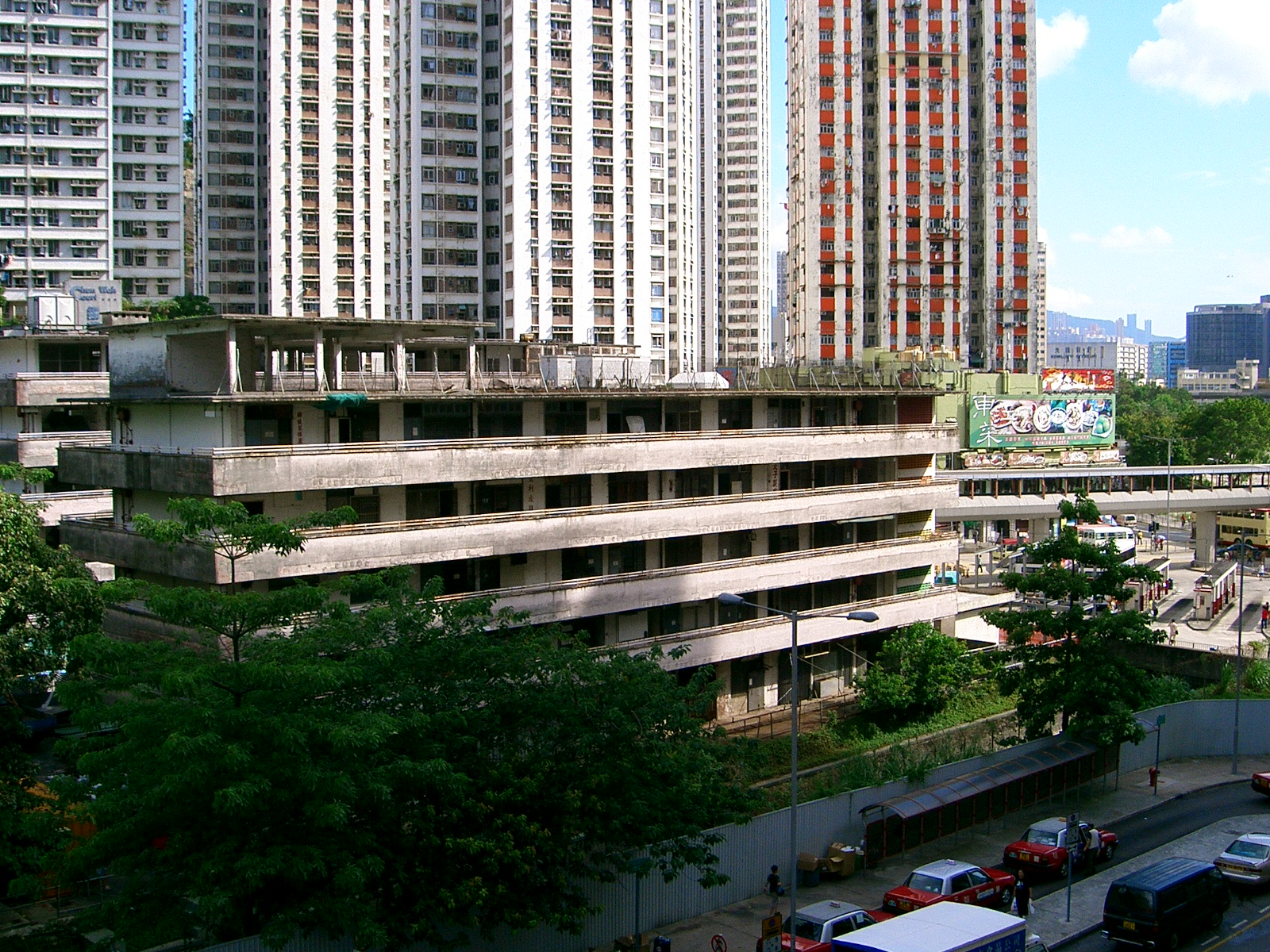
Jordan Valley Factory Estate in 2005

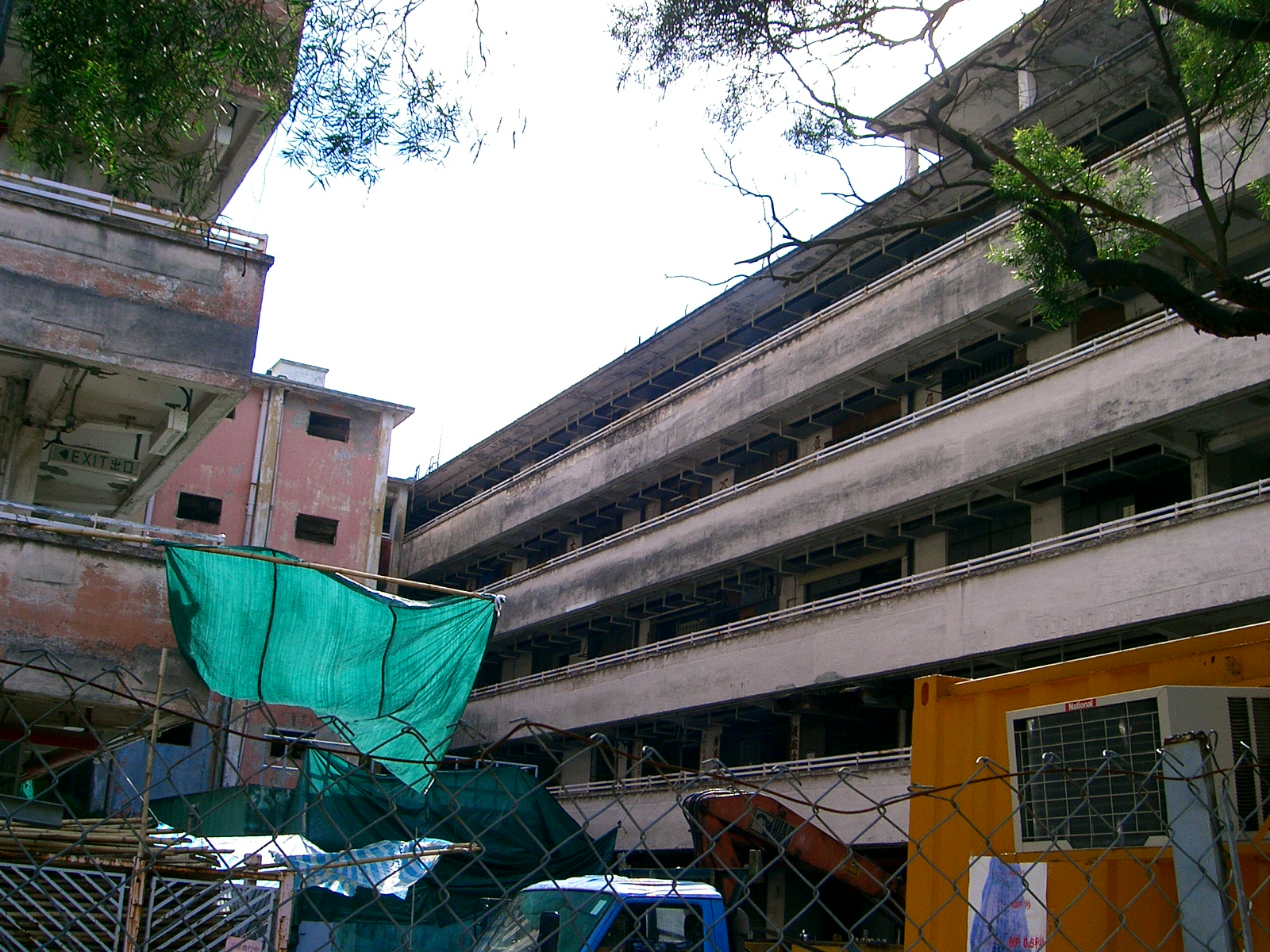
Jordan Valley Factory Estate in 2005

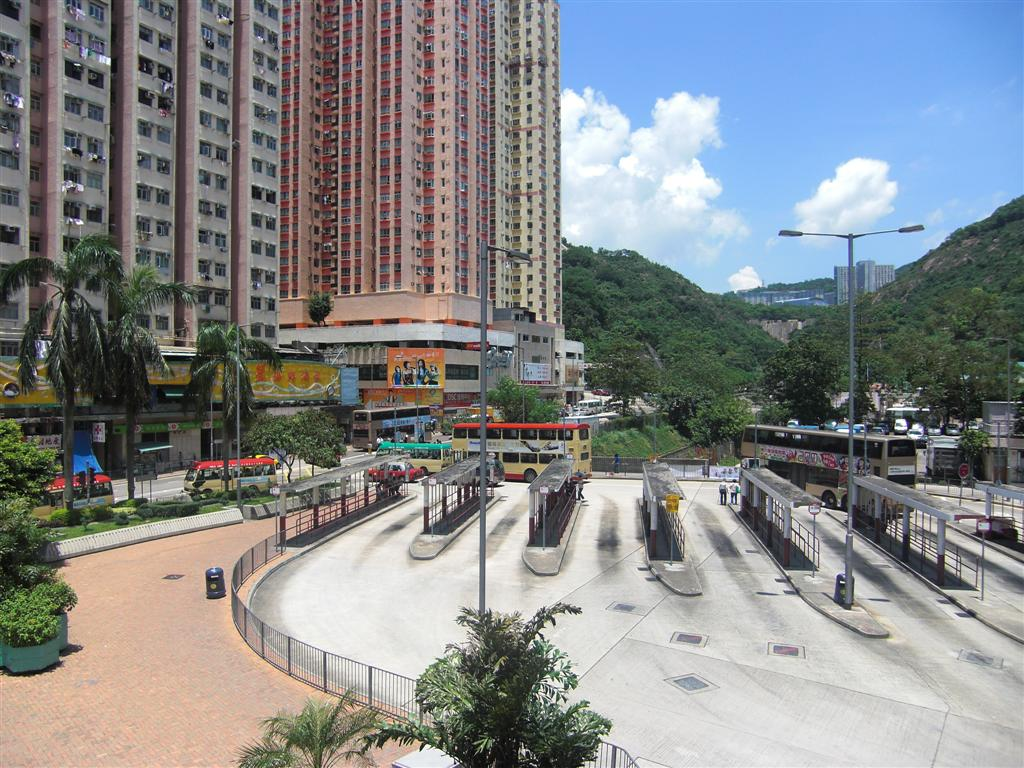
Ngau Tau Kok Bus Terminus

Jordan Valley Factory Estate (Chinese: 佐敦谷工廠大廈) was a factory estate in Jordan Valley, Ngau Tau Kok, Kowloon, Hong Kong, owned and managed by the Hong Kong Housing Authority. It was built in 1959. In 1983, its west wing was demolished to construct the new Ngau Tau Kok Bus Terminus. The remaining buildings were cleared in 2004 and demolished in 2005.

== See also ==
- Manufacturing in Hong Kong
- Public factory estates in Hong Kong
