= Lee Sing-man =

Chinese paper-tearing artist

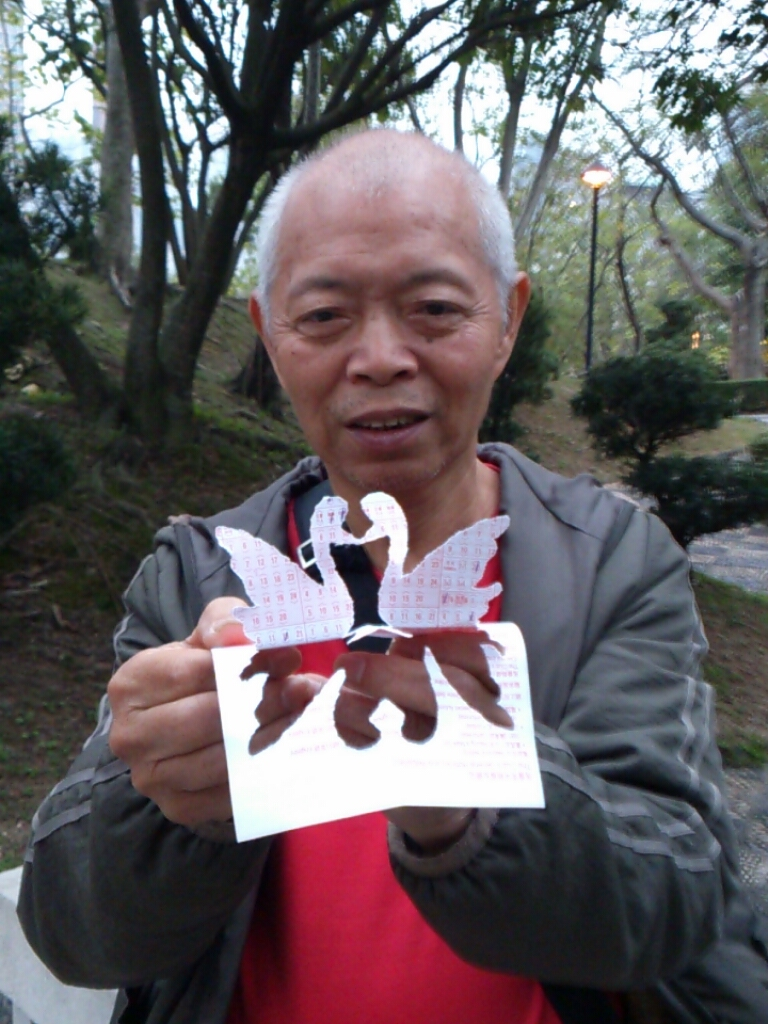
- "Uncle Man" with his art
- Born: 1944 (age 81–82) (Note: According to his Hong Kong ID (HKID) card, his year of birth is 1946.); Guangdong, China
- Other name: Uncle Man

Chinese name
- Traditional Chinese: 李昇敏
- Yale Romanization: Léih Sīngmáhn
- Jyutping: Lei5 Sing1man5

Lee Sing-man (born ~1944), commonly known as "Uncle Man", is a paper-tearing artist in Hong Kong.

He was once a volunteer in Kowloon Walled City Park, creating his works there, before he was invited to demonstrate in Tsim Sha Tsui and became commonly known.

== Biography ==
=== Early life and education ===
Lee Sing-Man was born in 1944 in Guangdong, China, where he attended primary school. During his early education, he faced difficulties with concentration. When he was around fourteen years old, in 1958, he moved to Hong Kong and continued his studies in secondary school. To gain admission to secondary school, he was required to pass an entrance exam, which he failed five times before succeeding on his sixth attempt. Right after graduating from secondary school, he studied business administration for a year before changing his focus to Chinese literature. Eventually, he ended his undergraduate studies due to objections from his family, and he began to work.

At first, he worked at his cousin's watch company. He then worked as a quality control checker in a garment factory, followed by a debt collector in a stationery wholesale company, then a delivery courier. It was during this time that he started doing paper-tearing. According to him, working as a local delivery courier was difficult but rewarding. He usually gave out his paper-tearing artwork to the companies while delivering goods to them. He was very pleased to see the companies decorating their offices with his creations.

Soon he resigned from his job as a delivery courier due to increasing demand for his paper-tearing lessons, performances, and voluntary work, and started to concentrate on promoting paper-tearing art.

=== 1983-1999: paper-tearing ===
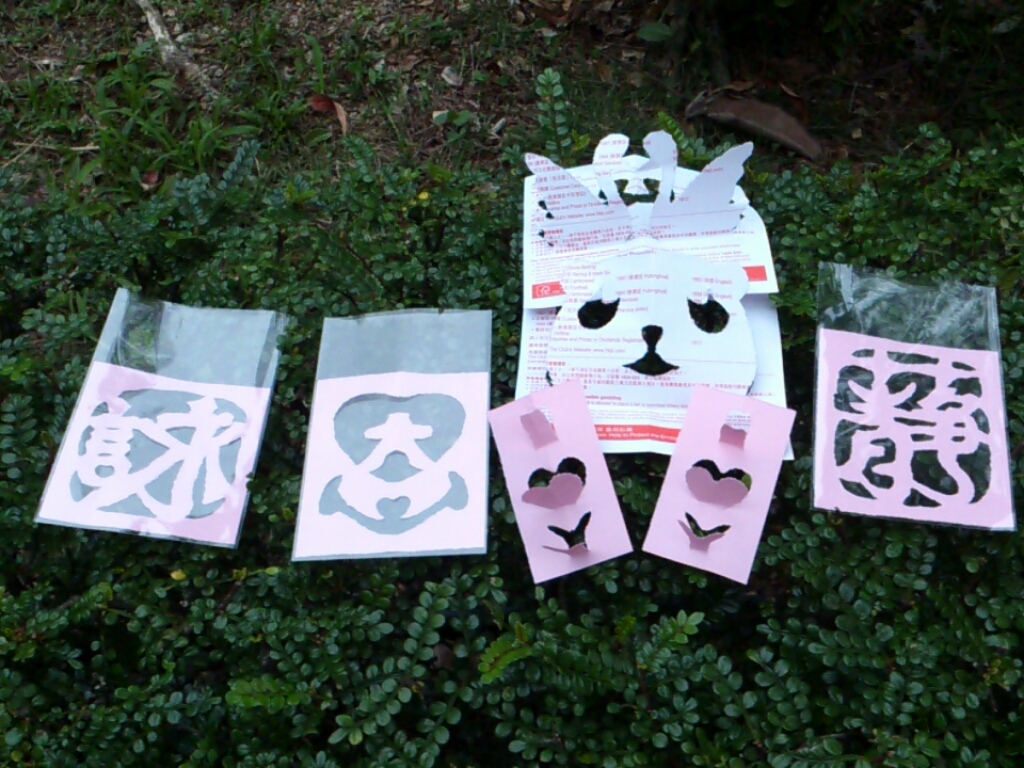
Uncle Man's work

On the Lunar New Year's Eve of 1983, Uncle Man created his first paper-tearing work. It was composed of the two Chinese characters "Dai Kat" (大吉), which means an expectation of a great fortune. Remarkably, he made it out of boredom with no one teaching him. Although the artwork was appreciated by his relatives, he did not have a great affection towards paper-tearing at that moment. It was only after he created his second paper-tearing piece during his work as a delivery man that he started to practice his skill. His second work was interpreted as "A million gold pieces". Afterward, he started giving his artwork to his friends as gifts.

Uncle Man tears paper according to the order of strokes of the word. He practices adding symmetrical features to words, figures and even three-dimensional words. In fact, to promote paper-tearing skills, he worked to decrease the number of steps and have fun at the same time, so that even a two-year-old child can both learn and enjoy making them. He usually uses recycled paper for his artwork in the hopes of protecting the environment and making paper-tearing popularized. For instance, he teaches children to use table mats from fast food shops to make paper-tearing works; therefore, children can make artwork without wasting paper.

=== 2000-Present ===
In 2000, Uncle Man moved to Kowloon city after his retirement.

The staff in the park encouraged him to apply for a stall demonstration in Tsim Sha Tsui, which was organized by the Hong Kong Cultural Centre. The application was successful and he eventually started working there. On his first day of the demonstration, he displayed his first masterpiece. It was composed of four Chinese characters "無言感激", meaning "deeply obliged", representing his speechless gratefulness to the staff of the park due to their unlimited support, as well as the opportunity to promote the paper-tearing art.

His artwork has attracted more and more public attention; more people and media have come to find him and learn more about his work. Others also conducted interviews with him and invited him for performances. He has performed and demonstrated paper craft art in Kowloon Walled City, Hong Kong Cultural Center, Avenue of Stars, Hong Kong, and Star Ferry, as well as in various restaurants, schools, hospitals and community centers.

== Personal life ==
He was once married and had a daughter, but got divorced and he never saw them again.

In 2000, he began devoting his life to volunteering at the Kowloon Walled City Park. Besides introducing paper-tearing art in the place, he also wanted to promote the park by introducing its history to tourists, entertaining people and himself by piping, and helping the tourists take photos in the park.

== Achievements ==
The following are Lee Sing-Man's accomplishments as a paper-tearing artist:

- He was able to popularize the art of paper-tearing and Chinese culture among schools, community centers and other regions.
- He was able to demonstrate paper-tearing in front of the presidents and the first ladies of Romania and Latvia.
- He had exhibitions of paper-tearing works in Yuen Long between 28 January 2008 and 24 February 2008, and between January 18, 2012 and February 6, 2012 in Wan Chai.
- He shared his work in workshops on October 13, 2012 in Jockey Club Inclusive Arts Program 2011-12 Annual Exhibition and Community Showcase.
- Besides promoting his paper-works, he was also able to introduce the history facts of the Kowloon Walled City among different tourists every day.
