= Jordan Valley, Hong Kong =

Neighborhood in Kwun Tong District

Coordinates: 22.32979°N 114.22050°E

- Chinese: 佐敦谷
Transcriptions
Standard Mandarin
- Hanyu Pinyin: Zuǒdūn Gǔ

Jordan Valley (Chinese: 佐敦谷) is a neighborhood north of Ngau Tau Kok, which is located in the north-west of Kwun Tong District, Hong Kong. It includes Amoy Gardens.

== Features ==
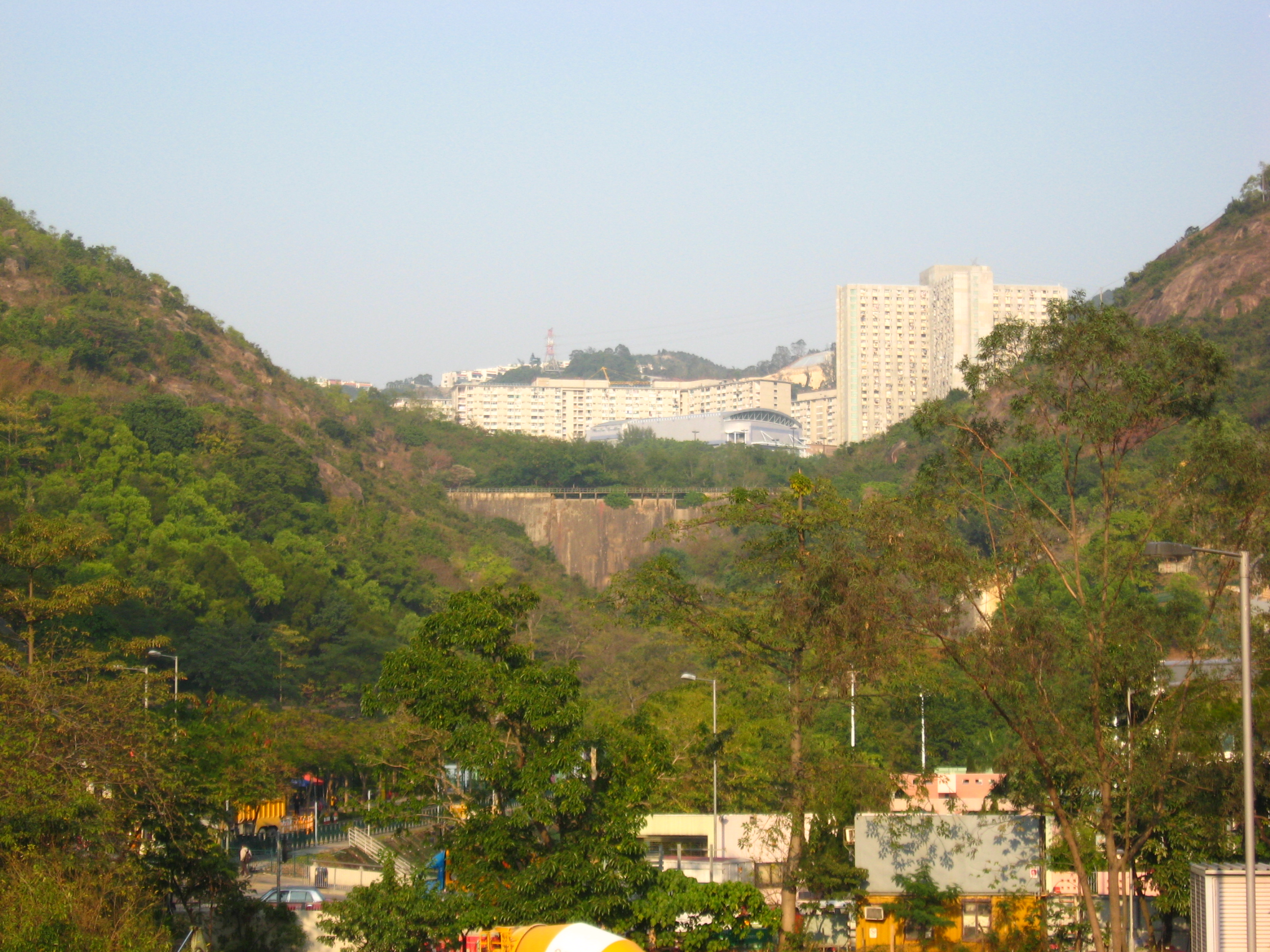
The main dam of Jordan Valley Reservoir in January 2009

Jordan Valley is a valley-like place, which is divided into northern and southern sections. The northern Jordan Valley is now Shun Lee Public Housing Area, next to the Fei Ngo Shan; and the southern Jordan Valley can be further divided into 2 areas: the eastern ecological recreation area and the western residential area. The quarry in the southern Jordan Valley is now under base development and will become one of the residential areas therein.

Jordan Valley can be divided into the following parts:

- Jordan Valley Public Housing Area (Currently an ecological recreation area)
- Choi Ha Estate
- Amoy Gardens and surroundings

== History ==
Jordan Valley was named after Gregory Paul Jordan, a British-Indian doctor for his contribution in plague fighting efforts.

The reservoir was built in the 1950s which provided flushing water to residents in Ngau Tau Kok. The reservoir has since become disused and is now a refuse reclamation area. A battery was also found in Jordan Valley quarry but was later removed due to the urban development project.

== Education ==
Jordan Valley is in Primary One Admission (POA) School Net 46. Within the school net are multiple aided schools (operated independently but funded with government money); no government primary schools are in this net.

== See also ==
- Jordan Valley Factory Estate
