= Sheung Chui Court =

Home Ownership Scheme housing estate in Hong Kong

Coordinates: 22.367391°N 114.120126°E

- Chinese: 尚翠苑
- Cantonese Yale: seuhng cheui yún
Transcriptions
Yue: Cantonese
- Yale Romanization: seuhng cheui yún
- Jyutping: soeng6 ceoi3 jyun2

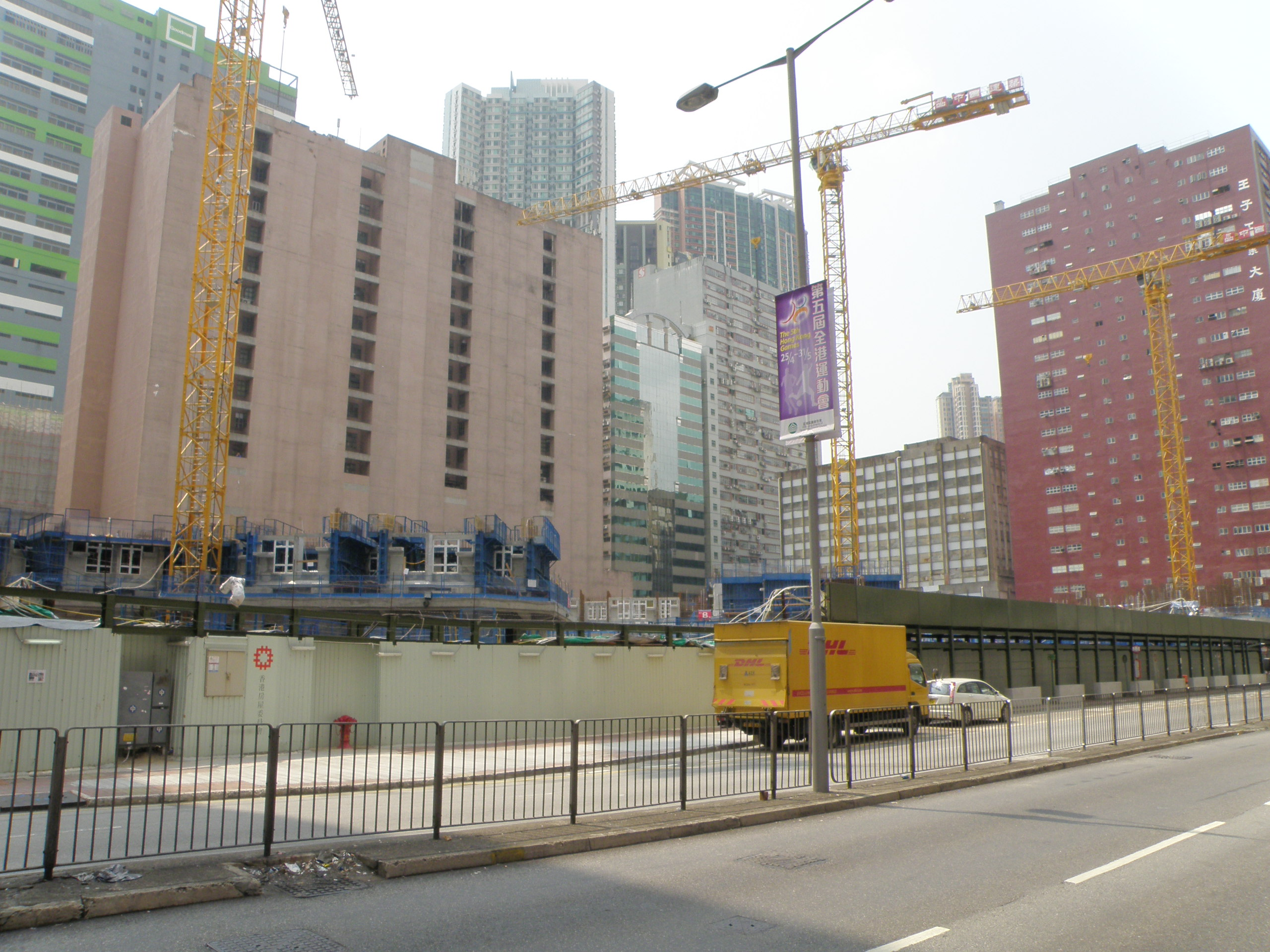
Sheung Chui Court under construction in March 2015

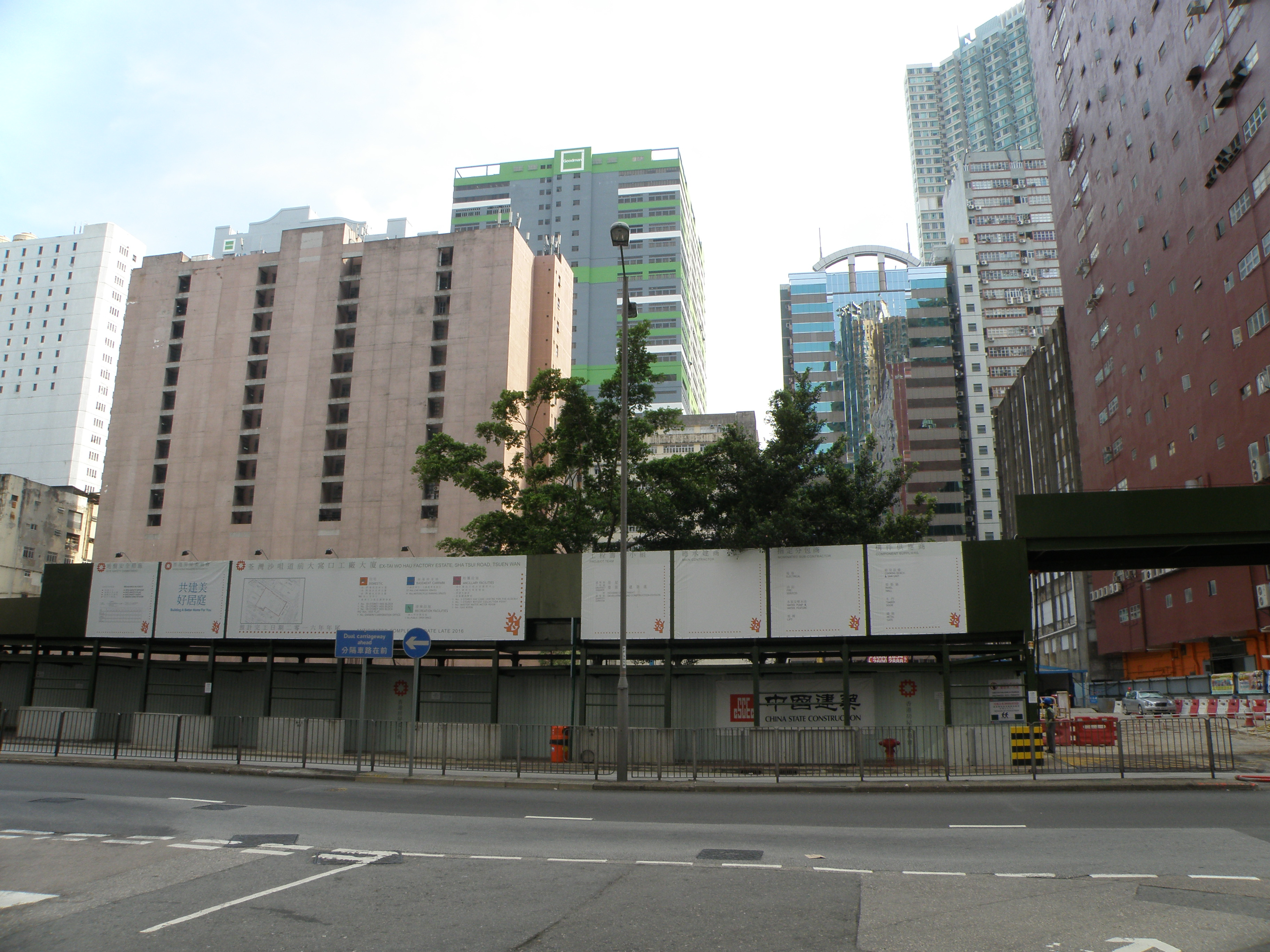
Sheung Chui Court under construction in July 2014

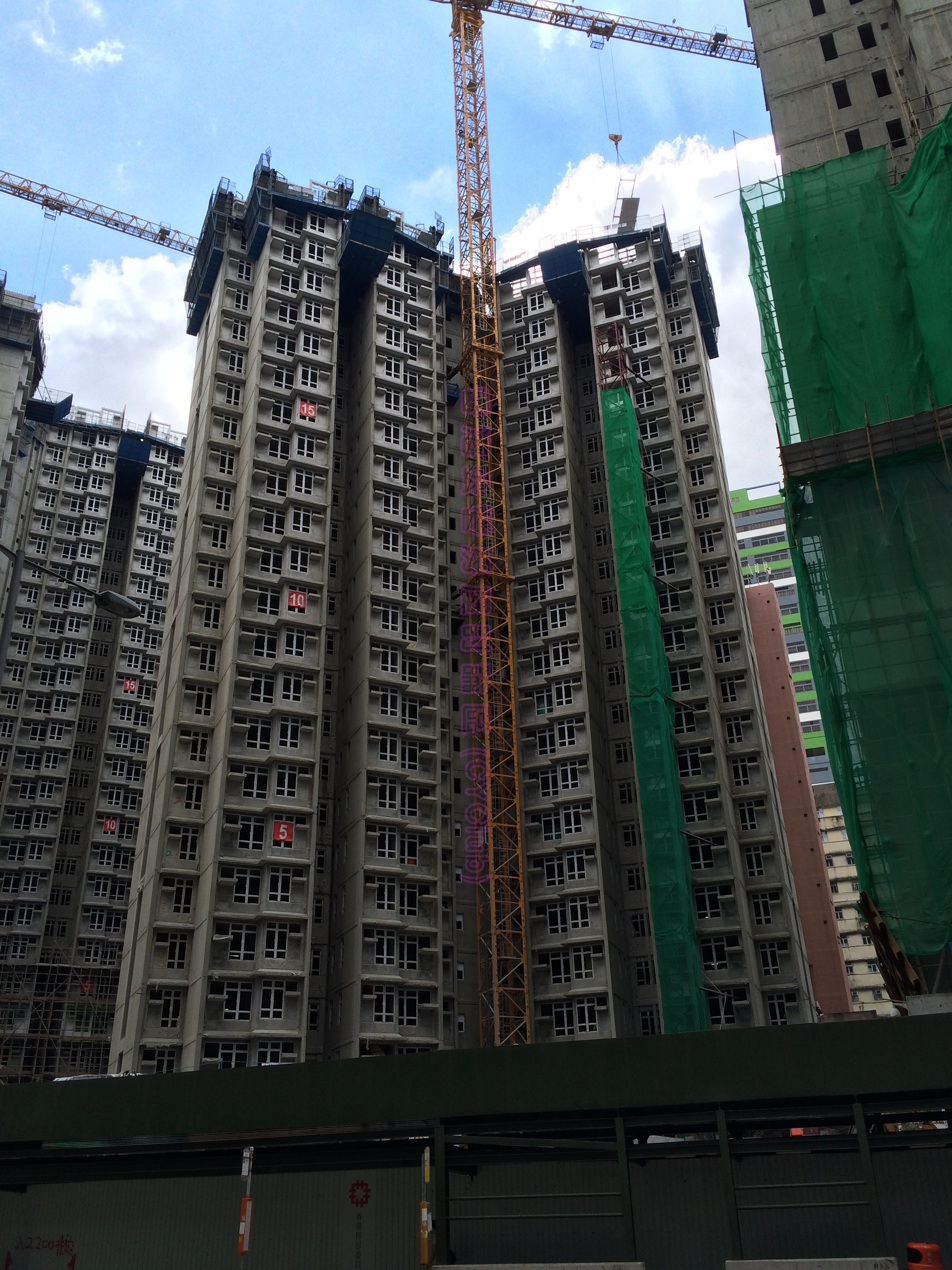
Sheung Chui Court under construction in December 2015

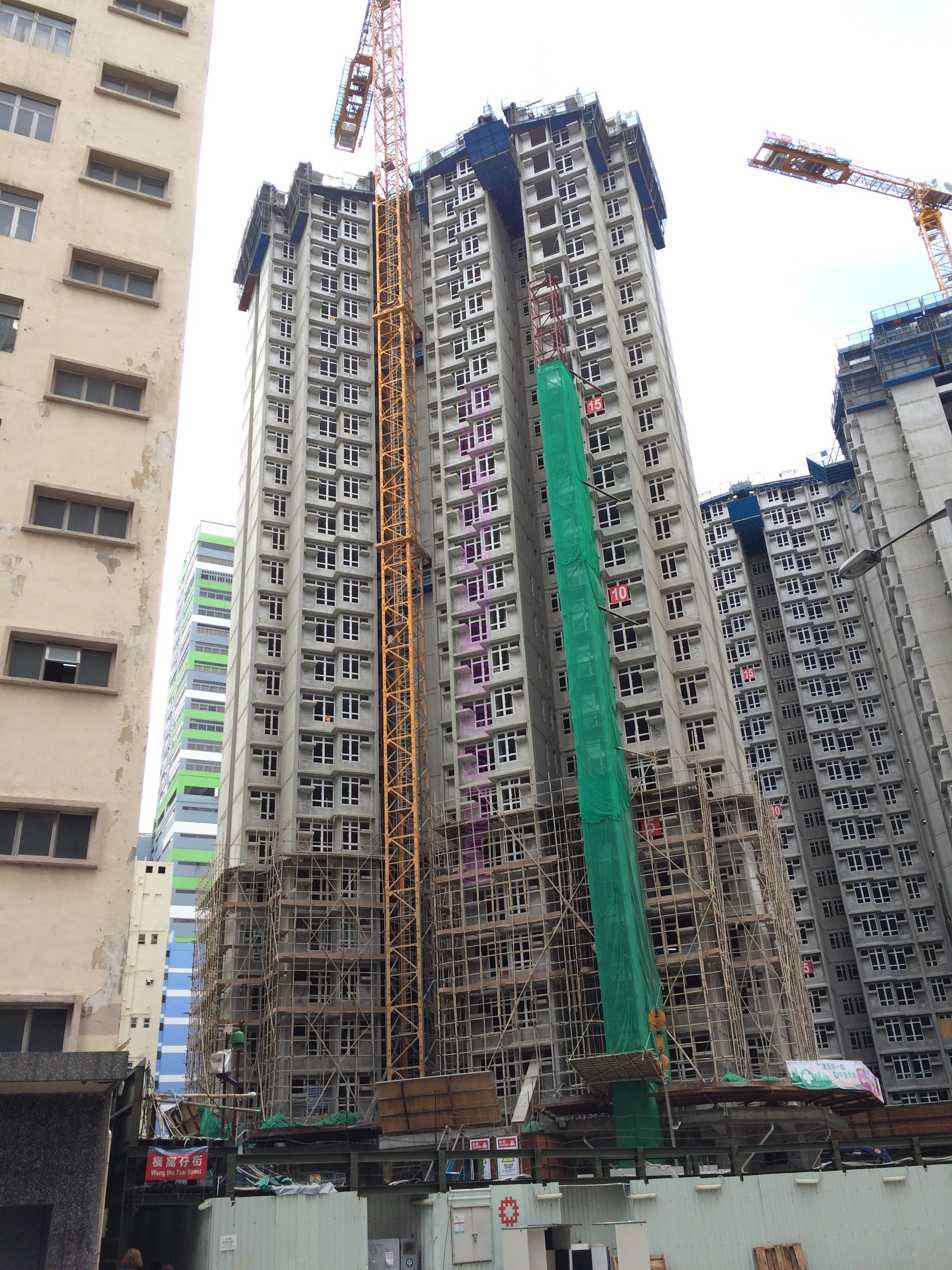
Sheung Chui Court under construction in December 2015

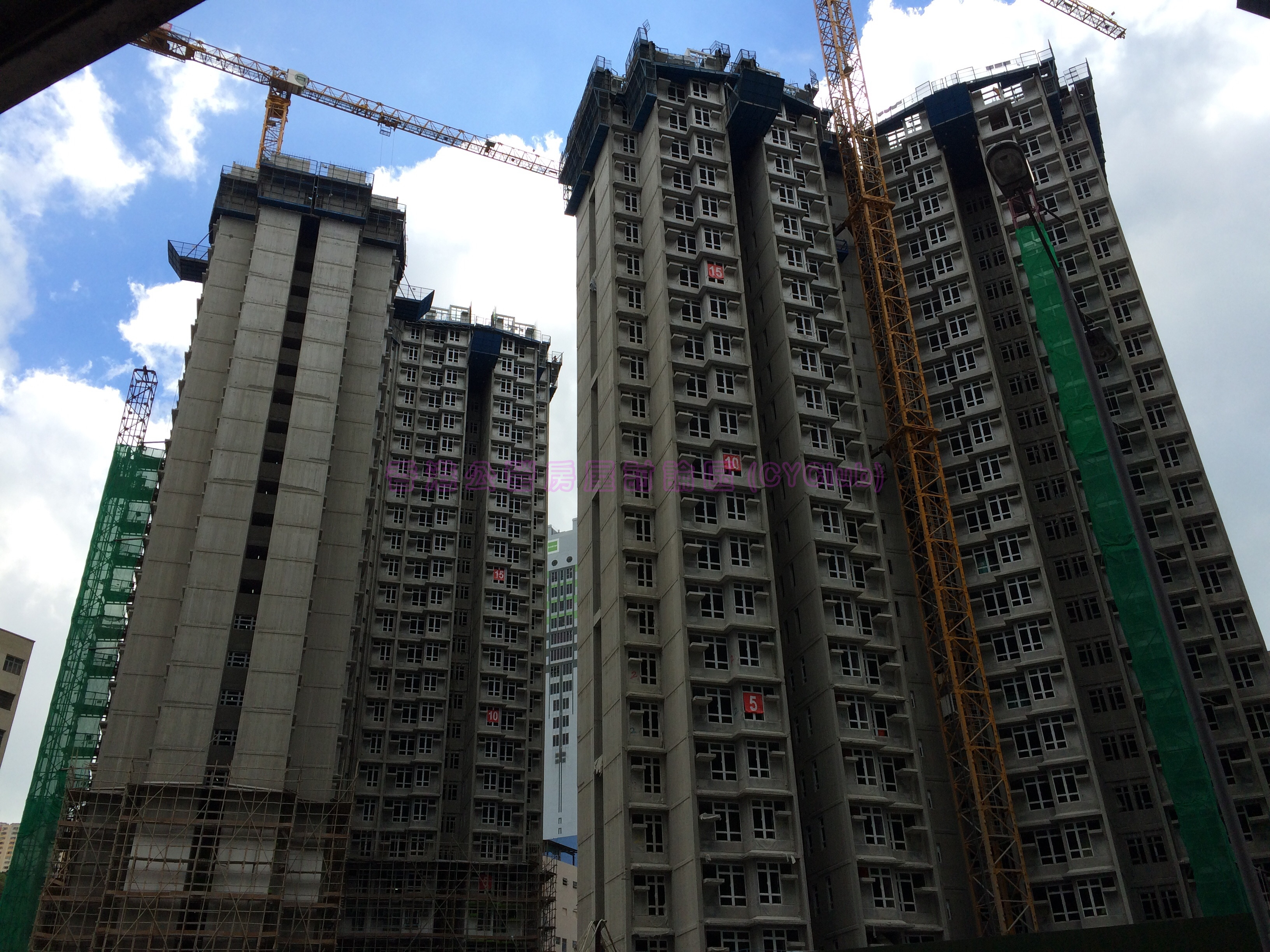
Sheung Chui Court under construction in December 2015

Sheung Chui Court (Chinese: 尚翠苑) is a home ownership scheme (HOS) court in Sha Tsui Road, Tsuen Wan, New Territories, Hong Kong, which is the first and only HOS court in Tsuen Wan District. It has 3 blocks (A has 31 storeys, B has 36 storeys, C has 40 storeys) with total of 962 units. Also, an elderly day care centre is within the court. It was offered for sale to public in December 2014 and is expected to be completed in 2017.

The site was Tai Wo Hau Factory Estate with three low-rise blocks that was demolished in 2010. The empty plot was use as a commercial carpark until 2013, that is when foundation work for Sheung Chui Court begins.

== Blocks ==
Name	Type	Completion
Chui Wu House (Block A)	Non-standard	2017
Chui Ho House (Block B)	Non-standard	2017
Chui Ting House (Block C)	Non-standard	2017

== Politics ==
Sheung Chui Court is located in Yeung Uk Road constituency of the Tsuen Wan District Council. It is currently represented by Steven Lam Sek-tim, who was elected in the 2019 elections.
