= Public factory estates in Hong Kong =

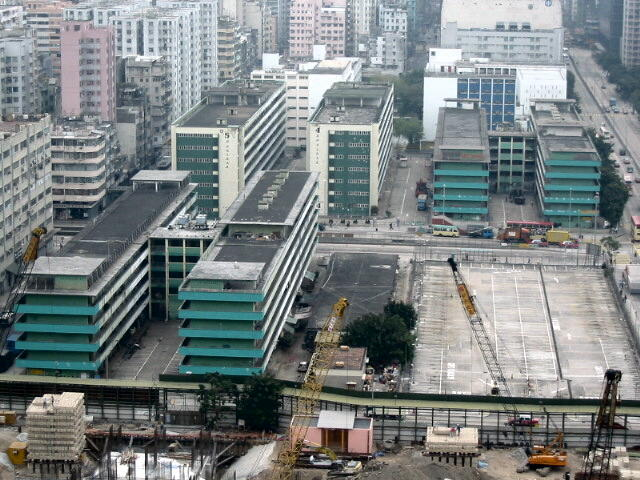
Cheung Sha Wan Factory Estate in 2003.

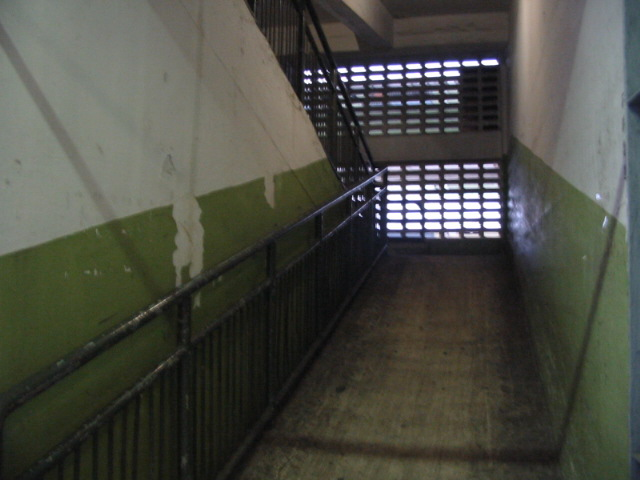
Ramp inside the Cheung Sha Wan Factory Estate, which did not have lifts.

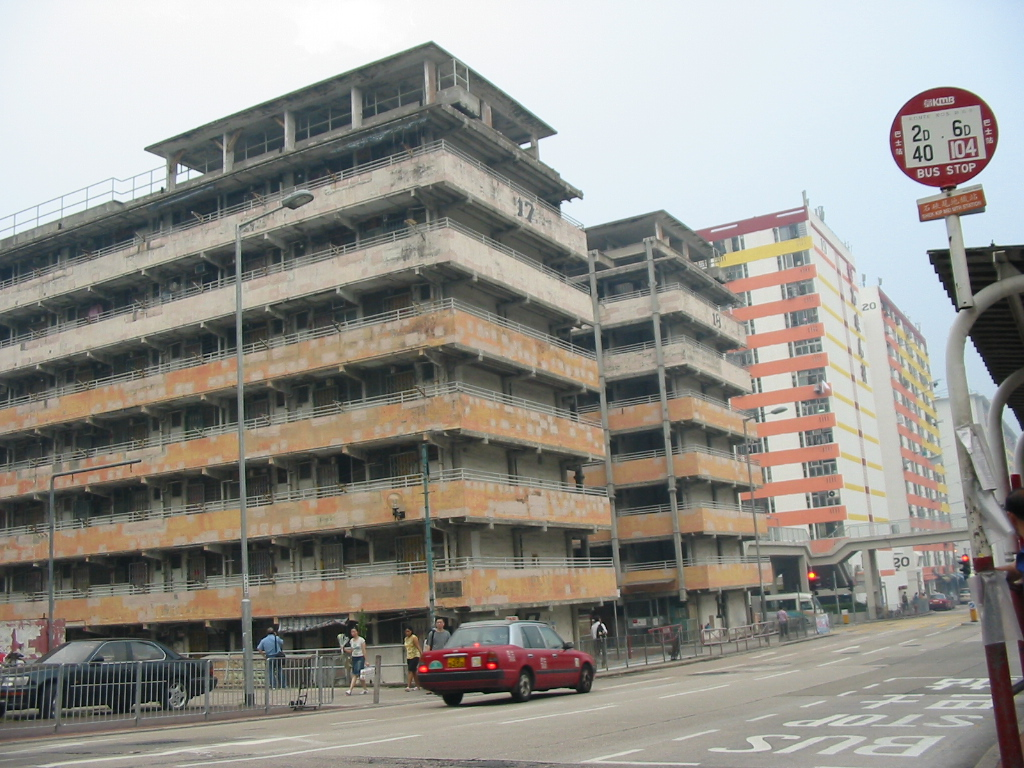
Blocks 17 and 18 of Shek Kip Mei Estate, a housing estate, in 2006. Note the similarity of architecture with Chai Wan Factory Estate.

Public factory estates are blocks of factory buildings owned by the Government of Hong Kong. Built between the late 1950s and the early 1980s, most of these industrial buildings have been demolished during the 1990s and 2000s, while some have been converted and a few are still active. While these buildings are notable as witnesses of the history of manufacturing in Hong Kong and of the public housing policy of the Government of Hong Kong, they represent only a fraction of the industrial buildings of the territory: there were about 1,700 industrial buildings in Hong Kong in 2003.

== History ==
The Resettlement Department of the Government of Hong Kong was formed in 1954. Between 1957 and 1973, it built eight flatted factory estates as part of the resettlement programme to reprovision squatter factories and cottage workshops displaced by clearance operations. The management of these factory estates was transferred to the Hong Kong Housing Authority upon its establishment in 1973. The Housing Authority further built several factory estates in the late 1970s and the early 1980s in order to address a shortage of small factory units in private factory buildings. A total of 17 public factory estates were thus built. In order to focus on its core mission of providing subsidised rental housing to low-income families in need, the Housing Authority decided in 1989 to progressively absolve itself from the ownership and management of flatted factories in the long term.

In May 2021, the Hong Kong Housing Authority was still managing 6 factory estates: Hoi Tai Factory Estate in Tuen Mun, Kwai On and Chun Shing Factory Estates in Kwai Chung, Sui Fai Factory Estate in Fo Tan, Wang Cheong Factory Estate in Cheung Sha Wan and Yip On Factory Estate in Kowloon Bay. On 24 May 2021, it announced plans to redevelop 4 of them for public housing use: Kwai On Factory Estate, Sui Fai Factory Estate, Wang Cheong Factory Estate and Yip On Factory Estate. This decision was criticised as the factory estates had an occupancy rate of 97 percent and the majority of the tenants opposed the redevelopment plan.

== Features ==
By the end of 2004, 11 public factory estates were still active and owned by the Housing Authority. These 11 estates provided about 13,300 factory units with a total floor area of about 325,300 m^{2}. Five of the estates were built with no lift service. Of these 11 estates, five were managed by property management agents, with the other six managed by Housing Department staff.

== Conservation ==
Two out of the ten pre-1980 former public factory estates are still extant. The Chai Wan Factory Estate was listed as a Grade II historic building in 2013 and was planned for adaptive reuse. The estate was renovated and reopened in 2016 as the residential Wah Ha Estate (華廈邨), The Shek Kip Mei Factory Estate was converted into the Jockey Club Creative Arts Centre, which opened in 2008. These conversions are linked to the Heritage conservation and the Old Industrial Buildings Revitalization programmes of the government.

== Demolished estates ==
The former factory estates were:

Name and location	Notes	References	Photographs
Cheung Sha Wan Factory Estate (長沙灣工廠大廈) 22.335637°N 114.157249°E	Built between 1957 and 1965. Block 1 was demolished in 1990. The remaining 5 blocks were demolished in 2006.		
Jordan Valley Factory Estate (佐敦谷工廠大廈) 22.323053°N 114.216742°E	Built in 1959. Demolished in 2005. Now the site of the Ngau Tau Kok Bus Terminus.		
Kowloon Bay Factory Estate (九龍灣工廠大廈) 22.316555°N 114.213735°E	Built in 1975. Two seven-storey blocks. No lift. A total of 807 units, each of a standard size of 24 m^{2}. Vacating was completed in 2010, and demolition was completed by December 2010.		
Kwai Chung Factory Estate (葵涌工廠大廈) 22.368643°N 114.130809°E	Built between 1966 and 1973. Four 7-storey blocks, which were located directly adjacent to the Kwai Chung Estate. Demolished in 2001. The site is now part of the redeveloped Kwai Chung Estate, occupied by Pak Kwai House (百葵樓) and Hop Kwai House (合葵樓), completed in 2008.	picture picture	
Kwai On Factory Estate (葵安工廠大廈); Tai Lin Pai Road, Kwai Chung 22.360571°N 114.132995°E	Built in 1979. 766 factory units. Total floor area: 19,210 m^{2}. With lift service. Demolition started in 2023.		
Kwun Tong Factory Estate (觀塘工廠大廈) 22.315054°N 114.217147°E	Built in 1966. Two seven-storey blocks. No lift. A total of 817 units, each of a standard size of 24 m^{2}. Vacating completed in 2008. Demolished in 2008.		
San Po Kong Factory Estate (新蒲崗工廠大廈) 22.335575°N 114.199096°E	Six blocks built in December 1962 (Block 1 & 2), March 1963 (Block 3 & 4) and June 1965 (Block 5 & 6). Design based on resettlement estates Mark I, with an I-shaped layout. Four five-storey blocks and two seven-storey blocks. No lift. 2008 factory units of a standard size of 24 m^{2}. Vacating completed in 2006. Demolished in 2007.	map picture picture	
Shun Kei Factory Estate (順基工廠大廈); Castle Peak Road, Tsuen Wan 22.374563°N 114.105182°E (approximate location)	Built in 1982. Demolished in 1998 for development of the West Rail Project.		
Sui Fai Factory Estate (穗輝工廠大廈); Shan Mei Street, Fo Tan 22.396348°N 114.193697°E	Built in 1982. 1,597 factory units. Total floor area: 41,725 m^{2}. With lift service. Demolition started in 2023.		
Tai Wo Hau Factory Estate (大窩口工廠大廈); In Tsuen Wan 22.367187°N 114.120443°E	Three blocks built in November 1961, November 1962 and April 1966. No lift. One four-storey block, one five-storey block and one seven-storey block. 1035.5 units in standard sizes of 18 m^{2} or 24 m^{2}. Vacating completed in 2007. Demolished in 2009. It is now the site of Sheung Chui Court, a Home Ownership Scheme housing estate built in 2017.	map pictures pictures	
Wang Cheong Factory Estate (宏昌工廠大廈); Lai Chi Kok Road, Cheung Sha Wan 22.333965°N 114.15205°E	Built in 1984. 1,020 factory units. Total floor area: 26,648 m^{2}. With lift service. Demolition started in 2023.		
Yuen Long Factory Estate (元朗工廠大廈) 22.442995°N 114.032059°E	Built in 1966. Mark II single block Factory Estate. 405 factory units. Vacating completed in 1997. Demolished. It is now the site of Fung Ting Court, a Home Ownership Scheme housing estate built in 2001.		
Yip On Factory Estate (業安工廠大廈); Wang Hoi Road, Kowloon Bay 22.3203195°N 114.211093°E	Two blocks built in 1980 and 1981. 1,440 factory units. Total floor area: 36,378 m^{2}. With lift service. Demolition started in 2023.		

== Repurposed estates ==
The former factory estates were:

Name and location	Notes	References	Photographs
Chai Wan Factory Estate (柴灣工廠大廈) 22.264738°N 114.236419°E	Built in 1959. The second factory estate built in Hong Kong by the Public Works Department after Cheung Sha Wan Factory Estate. Listed as a Grade II historic building in 2013. No lift. 5-storey building with 378 units. The estate was renovated and reopened in 2016 as the residential Wah Ha Estate (華廈邨), with 187 apartments.		
Shek Kip Mei Factory Estate aka. Shek Kip Mei Flatted Factory Building (石硤尾工廠大廈) 22.33462°N 114.165603°E	Built in 1977. It was converted into the Jockey Club Creative Arts Centre, which opened in 2008.		

== Active estates ==
The following factory estates, owned by the Hong Kong Housing Authority, are still active as of January 2014:

Name and location	Notes	References	Photographs
Chun Shing Factory Estate (晉昇工廠大廈); Kwai Fuk Road, Kwai Chung 22.36111°N 114.119713°E	Built in 1982. 1 block. 26 storeys. 1,646 factory units. Total floor area: 41,079 m^{2}. With lift service.		
Hoi Tai Factory Estate (開泰工廠大廈); Kin Fat Street, Tuen Mun 22.399547°N 113.968565°E	Built in 1982. 1,764 factory units. Total floor area: 44,663 m^{2}. With lift service.		
