= Jockey Club Creative Arts Centre =

Arts center in Kowloon, Hong Kong, China

The Jockey Club Creative Arts Centre
- 賽馬會創意藝術中心
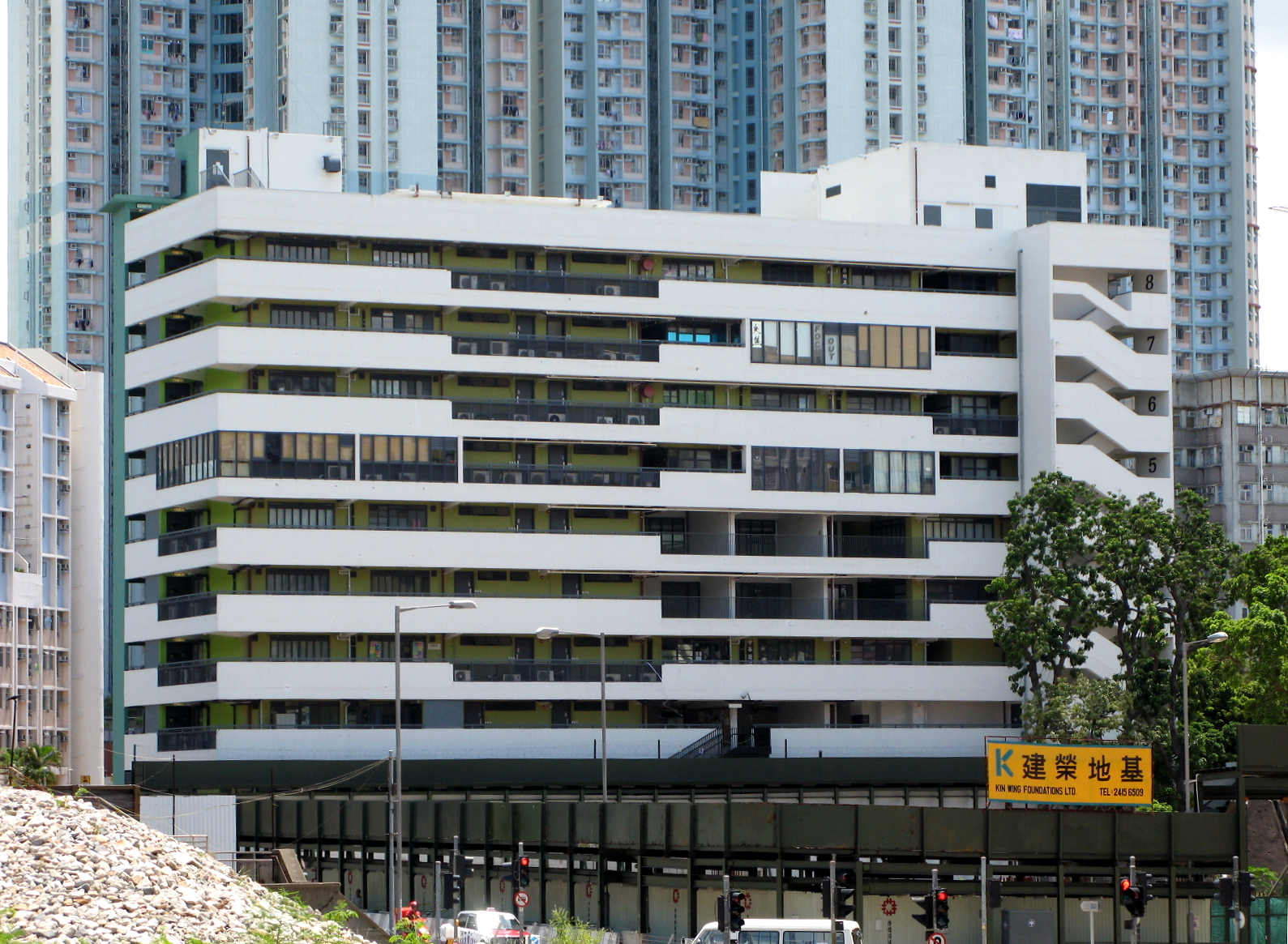
- Exterior of the Jockey Club Creative Arts Centre

- Location within Hong Kong
- Alternative names: Shek Kip Mei Factory Estate; Shek Kip Mei Flatted Factory Building; Shek Kip Mei Arts Centre

General information
- Location: 30 Pak Tin Street, Shek Kip Mei, Kowloon, Hong Kong
- Coordinates: 22°20′4.56″N 114°9′56.16″E
- Construction started: 31 October 2005; 20 years ago
- Completed: 28 February 2008; 18 years ago
- Opened: 26 September 2008; 17 years ago
- Cost: HK$75 million
- Client: Jockey Club Creative Arts Centre Home Affairs Bureau; HKSAR Government; Hong Kong Baptist University; Hong Kong Jockey Club's Charities Trust; Hong Kong Arts Development Council Hong Kong Arts Centre

Height
- Roof: transparent
- Top floor: rooftop (Level-9)

Technical details
- Floor count: 9 (including the ground floor, excluding the rooftop)
- Floor area: 10,000 m^{2} (110,000 sq ft) (Total lettable) 2,954.574 m^{2} (31,802.77 sq ft) (Site area)
- Lifts/elevators: 3

Design and construction
- Architect: P & T Architects & Engineers Ltd. Meta4 Design Forum Ltd
- Structural engineer: P & T Architects & Engineers Ltd.
- Quantity surveyor: Bridgewater & Coulton Ltd
- Main contractor: Sun Fook Kong Group
- Awards: Medal of the Year of Hong Kong, HKIA Annual Awards 2008

Other information
- Seating capacity: 120 (Black-box theatre)

Website
- jccac.org.hk

References
- >The Hong Kong Institute of Architects, HKIA Annual Awards 2008, p. 4-7

Jockey Club Creative Arts Centre
- Traditional Chinese: 賽馬會創意藝術中心
- Simplified Chinese: 赛马会创意艺术中心
Transcriptions
Standard Mandarin
- Hanyu Pinyin: Sàimǎhuì Chuàngyì Yìshù Zhōngxīn
Yue: Cantonese
- Jyutping: coi3 maa5 wui6*2 cong3 ji3 ngai6 seot6 zung1 sam1

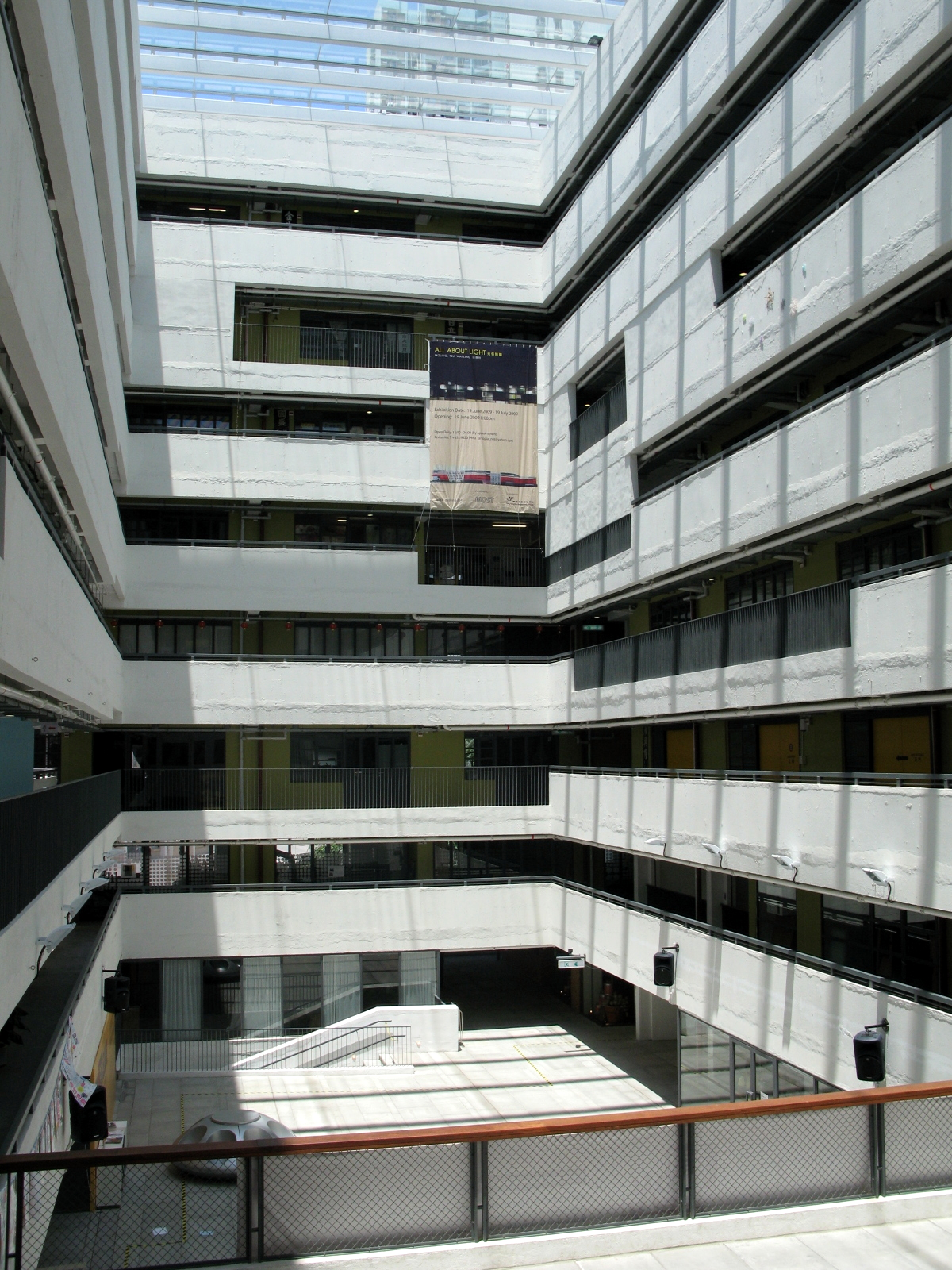
Central Courtyard, JCCAC

The Jockey Club Creative Arts Centre (JCCAC; Chinese: 賽馬會創意藝術中心) is a multi-disciplinary artist village and arts centre in Shek Kip Mei, Hong Kong, housed in a converted nine-storey factory estate. It is dedicated to supporting artist development and promoting arts and culture to the public. A wide variety of art practices are represented at JCCAC, especially those in the visual arts.

JCCAC was established through collaboration with strategic partners the Hong Kong Arts Development Council (HKADC), and the Hong Kong Arts Centre (HKAC), and is a self-financed subsidiary of Hong Kong Baptist University (HKBU). Conversion of the building was funded by the Hong Kong Jockey Club Charities Trust which was given the naming rights, and was supported by the Home Affairs Bureau. (now replaced by the Culture, Sports and Tourism Bureau). The JCCAC officially opened on 26 September 2008 as a self-financed registered charity.

== Establishment ==
- 31 October 2005, ceremony to kick start the building conversion project.
- 21 November 2006, tenant applications were opened.
- January 2007, applications outnumbered places 5:1. JCCAC selected 112 applicants: six arts organisations, 88 artists or arts groups and the remainder being students or graduates of arts institutes.
- 28 February 2008, completion of the building conversion project.
- March 2008, the first tenants moved in.
- 26 September 2008, JCCAC was officially opened to the public.

== Architecture ==
The building housing the JCCAC was formerly known as the Shek Kip Mei Flatted Factory Building or the Shek Kip Mei Factory Estate. The Factory Estate was built in 1977 and comprised one nine-storey block accommodating 390 factory units. It was a facility of housing cottage and local light industries in the late 1970s and was owned by the Hong Kong Housing Authority (HA). It fell into disuse particularly due to a steep decline in the local garment industry in 1990s in Hong Kong when owners started to move their businesses to mainland China. The building was vacant from May 2001.

The JCCAC was the first adaptive reuse attempt in Hong Kong to convert a decommissioned factory building into a creative arts centre. The interior of the centre retains architectural features of factories (architecturally it is reminiscent of London's Tate Modern). The design aims to strike a fine balance between new and old features in order to achieve integration with the surrounding neighbourhood and to preserve the inherent characteristics of the old factory building. The conversion preserved much of the original building’s period charm while injecting new vitality, and was awarded 'Medal of the Year of Hong Kong' in HKIA Annual Awards 2008 by the Hong Kong Institute of Architects (HKIA).

== Management ==
The Jockey Club Creative Arts Centre is managed by Hong Kong Creative Arts Centre Limited (a self-financed subsidiary set up by the Hong Kong Baptist University under an agreement with the Hong Kong Government, and in strategic partnership with the Hong Kong Arts Development Council and the Hong Kong Arts Centre, and Sham Shui Po District Council.

== Facilities ==
The Jockey Club Creative Arts Centre provides a total of 140 studio units (most of them measuring 300 sq ft.) at affordable rent encompassing a wide spectrum of the various tenants’ art practices including painting, sculpture, ceramics, photography, art-tech, illustration, music, dance, community art and art education. The Centre also has supporting facilities such as a Black Box Theatre, two exhibition galleries, and a central courtyard for organisation of programmes and activities. Facing the Central Courtyard of the building (Level-1), a few rental spaces are reserved for shops and eateries, including a café and a Chinese tea house.

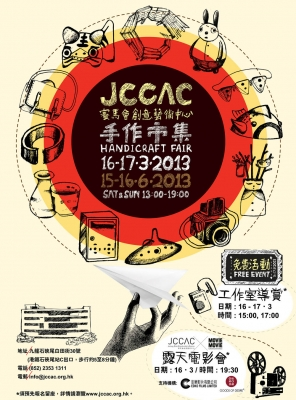
Handicraft Fair poster

== Photo gallery ==
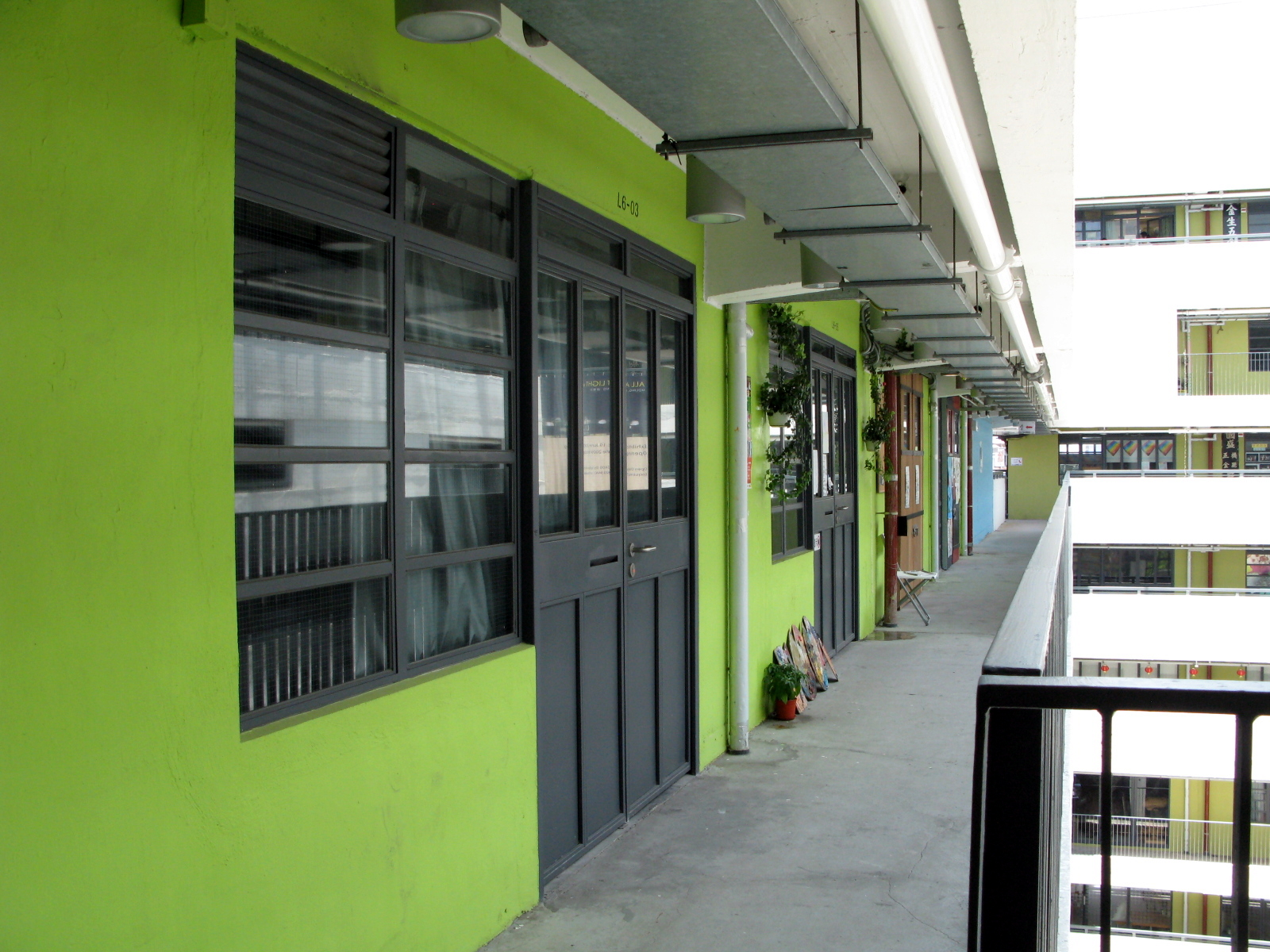
Studio inside art centre

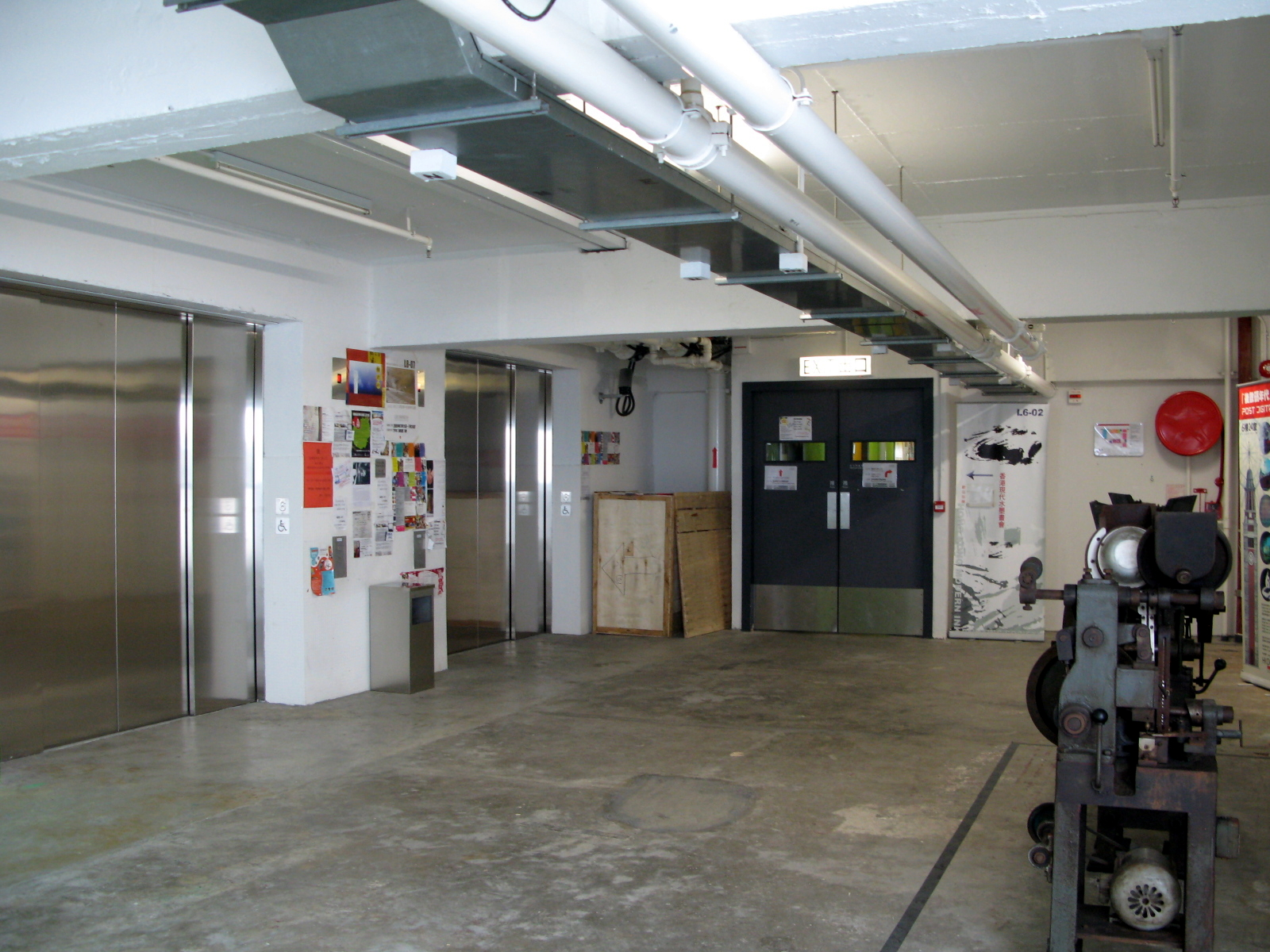
Lift lobby

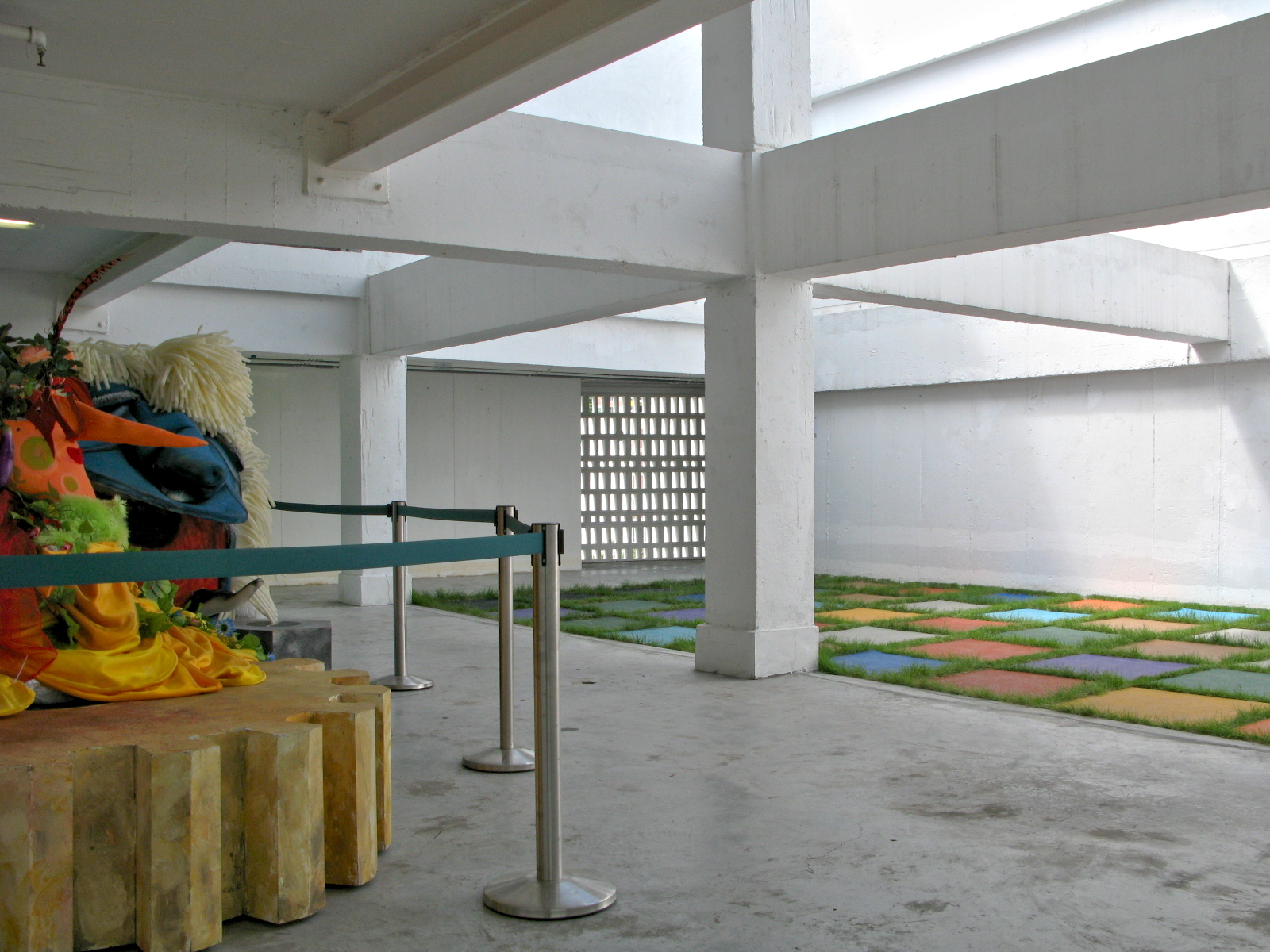
Common Space in Level 7

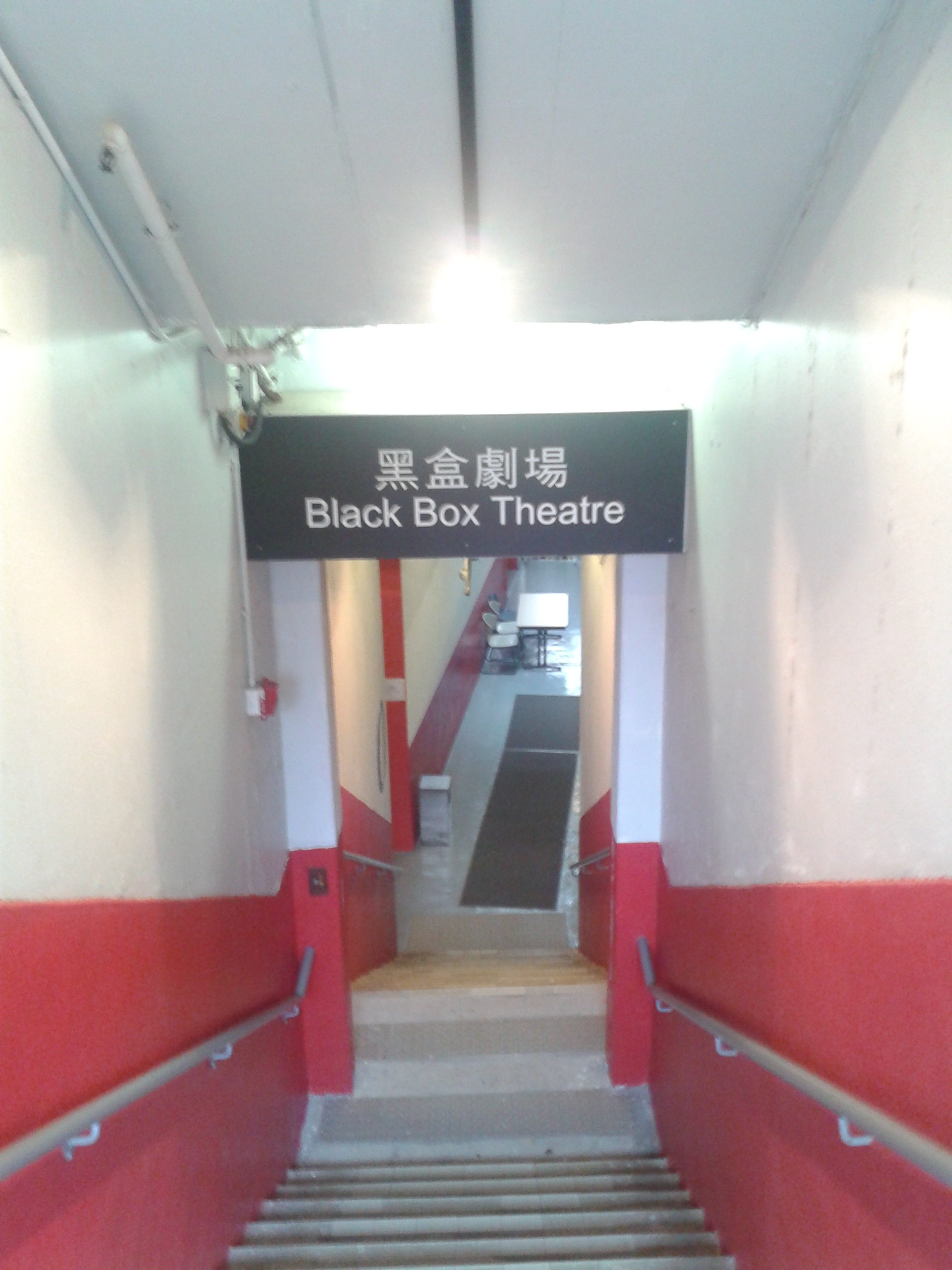
The entrance of the Black Box Theatre in JCCAC.

== Controversies ==
=== Various problems ===
As a pioneer project, in the first couple of years of its opening, "Artists complained about bureaucratic management, unusable public space, inadequate publicity and poor facilities. Visitors were unhappy to find many studios closed as a result of some artists saying they simply wanted a quiet place to work." JCCAC has since achieved better expectations management through establishing closer programme collaborations regularly organising social gatherings with tenants and offering guided tours for the public.

=== Rent rises ===
"Artists are unhappy about a sudden 20 per cent rent increase for studio space. All occupants of the factory turned artist incubator would have to pay a new elevated rate of HK$7.80 per square foot – up from HK$6.50 per sq ft for many – once their contracts come due. Although the centre had warned tenants last year(2011) they would have to pay HK$7.50 per sq ft starting this year(2012), the back-to-back rent rises took many by surprise. 'I am not against increasing the rent if it's necessary,' said tenant Mac Mak Keung-wai of the A&M Art Workshop. 'I just feel that this is a commercially driven decision and that it strays from the original vision of the centre.'" Despite such views, demand for JCCAC studios remained high as JCCAC’s rent was notably lower than market rate – for example the rental index published by the government showed that the average rent of private flatted factories in January 2012 was HK$11.30 per sq ft, which meant that JCCAC’s rent at HK$7.80 per sq ft was actually more than 30% lower than the market average that year.

== See also ==
- Public factory estates in Hong Kong
- Shek Kip Mei Estate
- Cattle Depot Artist Village
- Fo Tan
- West Kowloon Cultural District
- Hong Kong Arts Centre
- Hong Kong Visual Arts Centre
- Hong Kong Fringe Club
- 798 Art Zone
- M+
