= List of bus routes in Hong Kong =

The following is a list of current franchised bus routes in Hong Kong, sorted according to bus companies. All current franchised bus routes are operated by air-conditioned buses only and fares are paid through flat fares. Note that Hong Kong Island, Kowloon and New Territories and Lantau Island have their own, separate route numbering systems.

== Hong Kong Island routes ==
All bus routes running within Hong Kong Island are operated by Citybus.

Route	Terminal			Notes & Remarks
1	Central (Macau Ferry)	↔	Happy Valley (Upper)	
1M	Exhibition Centre station	↺	Wong Nai Chung Gap	Circular
1P	Wong Nai Chung Road (Broadwood Road)	→	Central Market	Morning peak hours only
2	Grand Promenade	↔	Central (Macau Ferry)	
2A	Yiu Tung Estate	↔	Exhibition Centre station	
2X	Sai Wan Ho (Grand Promenade)	↔	Exhibition Centre station	Express
3A	Central (Star Ferry)	↔	Felix Villas	Peak Hours only
4	Wong Chuk Hang	↔	Central (Exchange Square)	After Morning Peak Only
4	Wah Fu (South)	↺	Central	Circular; Morning Peak Hours only
4	Tin Wan	→	Wah Fu (South)	Morning Peak Hours only Via Central
4X	Wah Fu (South)	↺	Central (Exchange Square)	Express Circular, MON - SAT; Via Rumsey Street Flyover to Wah Fu in the A.M. Peak Hour
5B	Felix Villas	↔	Causeway Bay (Hong Kong Stadium)	
5B	Tung Lo Wan Road	→	Felix Villas	Only departs at 0840
5B	Kennedy Town	↔	Yee Wo Street	After 23:40 operate via Irving Street and terminate at Yee Wo Street until 2:40
5X	Kennedy Town	↔	Causeway Bay (Whitfield Road)	Express; Via Rumsey Street Flyover
6	Stanley Market	↔	Central (Exchange Square)	Via Wong Nai Chung Gap Road, Repulse Bay, Ma Hang (Stanley Plaza)
6A	Central (Exchange Square)	→	Stanley Fort (Gate)	Morning Peak Hours only Via Deep Water Bay, Repulse Bay
6X	Stanley Prison	↔	Central (Exchange Square)	Express; Via Deep Water Bay, Repulse Bay, Ma Hang
6X	Stanley Fort (Gate)	→	Central (Exchange Square)	Express; Evening Peak Hours only
7	Shek Pai Wan	↔	Central Ferry Piers	
8	Heng Fa Chuen	↔	Exhibition Centre station	Express; Via Island Eastern Corridor
8H	Chai Wan (East)	↔	Tung Wah Eastern Hospital	
8P	Siu Sai Wan (Island Resort)	↔	Exhibition Centre station	Express; Via Island Eastern Corridor
8X	Siu Sai Wan (Island Resort)	↔	Happy Valley (Upper)	Express; Via Island Eastern Corridor
8X	Siu Sai Wan (Island Resort)	↔	Causeway Bay (Causeway Road)	Peak Hours only
9	Shek O	↔	Shau Kei Wan	
10	Kennedy Town	↔	North Point Ferry Pier	
11	Central Ferry Piers	↺	Jardine's Lookout	Circular
11	Central Ferry Piers	→	Tai Hang Drive	Morning Peak Hours only
12	Central (Pier 3)	↺	Robinson Road	Circular – the first circular route in Hong Kong. Service started by China Motor Bus on 16 August 1955, transferred to Citybus on 1 September 1993.
12A	Admiralty (Tamar Street)	↺	MacDonnell Road	Circular
12M	Admiralty (Tamar Street)	↺	Park Road	Circular; Morning Peak Hours only
13	Admiralty (Tamar Street)	↔	Kotewall Road (Mid-levels)	
14	Sai Wan Ho (Grand Promenade)	↔	Stanley Fort (Gate)	
14	Grand Promenade	↔	Ma Hang (Stanley Plaza)	A.M. Peak Hours Special Service
15	The Peak	↔	Central (Pier 5)	
15	The Peak	↔	Central (Exchange Square)	Special Service; A.M. Peak Hour Service Only
15B	The Peak	↔	Wan Chai (HKCEC Extension)	Service on Sundays & Public Holidays Only
15C	Garden Road (Lower Peak Tram Terminus)	↔	Central (Star Ferry)	One open-top bus was deployed on this route between 17 January 2000 and 27 September 2014; Formerly route 626
18	North Point (Healthy Street Central)	↔	Kennedy Town (Belcher Bay)	
18	North Point (Healthy Street Central)	→	Sheung Wan	Morning Peak Hours only
18P	Kennedy Town (Belcher Bay)	↔	North Point (Healthy Street Central)	Express; Morning Peak Hours only Via Rumsey Street Flyover
18X	Kennedy Town (Belcher Bay)	↔	Shau Kei Wan	Express; Via Central–Wan Chai Bypass
18X	Chai Wan Station	→	Kennedy Town (Belcher Bay)	Express; Morning Peak Hours only
19P	Shau Kei Wan	→	Happy Valley (Upper)	Morning Peak Hours only, Available on School Days
23	Pokfield Road	↔	North Point Ferry Pier	
23B	Braemar Hill	→	Robinson Road	Peak Hours only, Available on School Days
23B	Park Road	→	Braemar Hill	Peak Hours only, Available on School Days
23X	Pokfield Road	→	Sai Wan Ho	Morning Peak Hours only
25	Central (Pier 3)	↺	Braemar Hill	Circular
25A	Exhibition Centre station	↺	Braemar Hill	Circular, via Lai Tak Tsuen
26	Lai Tak Tsuen	↺	Hollywood Road	Circular
27	North Point Ferry Pier	↺	Braemar Hill	Circular
30X	Cyberport	↔	Admiralty (East)	Express; Via Rumsey Street Flyover
30X	Central (Exchange Square)	→	Cyberport	Morning Peak Hours only
33X	Cyberport	↔	Shau Kei Wan	Express; Via Central–Wan Chai Bypass
37A	Chi Fu Fa Yuen	↺	Central	Circular Via Aberdeen Tunnel
37B	Chi Fu Fa Yuen	↺	Admiralty	Circular Via Aberdeen Tunnel
37B	Central (Exchange Square)	→	Chi Fu Fa Yuen	Evening Peak Hours only Via Aberdeen Tunnel
37X	Chi Fu Fa Yuen	↺	Admiralty	Circular; Morning Peak Hours only Via Aberdeen Tunnel
38	Chi Fu Fa Yuen	↔	North Point Ferry Pier	Via Aberdeen Tunnel
40	Wah Fu (North)	↔	Exhibition Centre station	Via Chi Fu Fa Yuen & Robinson Road
40M	Wah Fu (North)	→	Exhibition Centre station	Via Caine Road & Central
40P	Wah Fu (North)	→	Robinson Road	Morning Peak Hours only, Available on School Days
40P	Wah Kwai	→	Robinson Road	Morning Peak Hours only, Available on School Days
40P	Sham Wan	→	Robinson Road	Morning Peak Hours only, Available on School Days
41A	Wah Fu (Central)	↔	North Point Ferry Pier	Via Tai Hang Road, Nam Fung Road and Wong Nai Chung Gap
41A	Wah Fu (Central)	↔	North Point Ferry Pier	School Day Special Service Via Braemar Hill
42	Wah Fu (South)	↔	North Point Ferry Pier	Morning Peak Hours only Via Aberdeen Tunnel
42C	Cyberport	↔	North Point Ferry Pier	Peak Hours only Via Aberdeen Tunnel
47P	Kennedy Town (Belcher Bay)	→	Wong Chuk Hang	Morning Peak Hours only
48	Sham Wan	↺	Wah Fu (North)	Circular
48	Ocean Park	↺	Wah Fu (North)	Circular; Weekends & Holiday Special Service
48	Sham Wan	→	Wah Fu (North)	Morning Peak Hours only
49X	Chai Wan (East)	→	Cyberport	Morning Peak Hours only Via Aberdeen Tunnel
63	Stanley Market	↔	North Point Ferry Pier	Monday to Saturday only
65	Stanley Market	↔	North Point Ferry Pier	Express; Sundays and Public Holidays only
70	Wah Kwai	↔	Central (Exchange Square)	Express Via Aberdeen Tunnel
70P	Shek Pai Wan	↔	Central (Exchange Square)	Express Via Aberdeen Tunnel
71	Wong Chuk Hang	↔	Central (Rumsey Street)	Morning Peak Hours only
71P	Sham Wan	→	Central Ferry Piers	Morning Peak Hours only
72	Wah Kwai Estate	↔	Causeway Bay (Moreton Terrace)	Via Aberdeen Tunnel
72A	Sham Wan	↔	Causeway Bay (Moreton Terrace)	Via Aberdeen Tunnel
73	Cyberport	↔	Stanley Prison	
73	Wah Fu (North)	↔	Stanley Prison	Morning Peak Hours only
73	Stanley Village	→	Wong Chuk Hang Sports Centre	Evening Peak Hours only
73P	Sham Wan	→	Cyberport	Morning Peak Hours only, Available on School Days
73X	Wong Chuk Hang Station	↔	Cyberport	Express, Monday to Friday only
75	Sham Wan	↔	Central (Exchange Square)	Peak Hours only
76	Wong Chuk Hang station	↺	Causeway Bay	Circular
76	Shek Pai Wan	↺	Causeway Bay	Circular; Morning Peak Hours only
77	Tin Wan	↔	Shau Kei Wan	Via Aberdeen Tunnel
77X	Wah Kwai Estate	→	Sai Wan Ho	Express; Morning Peak Hours only Via Aberdeen Tunnel
78	Wong Chuk Hang	↺	Wah Kwai Estate	Circular
81	Hing Wah Estate	↔	Lai Tak Tsuen	
81A	Hing Wah Estate	↔	Lai Tak Tsuen	Peak Hours only, Available on School Days
82	Siu Sai Wan (Island Resort)	↔	North Point Ferry Pier	
82S	Siu Sai Wan (Island Resort)	→	Yiu Tung (Wai Hang Street)	Morning Peak Hours only Available on School Days
82S	Shau Kei Wan Plaza	→	Siu Sai Wan (Island Resort)	Morning Peak Hours only Available on School Days
82X	Siu Sai Wan (Island Resort)	↺	Quarry Bay	Express Circular
85	Siu Sai Wan (Island Resort)	↺	Braemar Hill	Circular; Via A Kung Ngam
85	Siu Sai Wan (Island Resort)	↔	North Point Ferry Pier	Service after 2210; Via A Kung Ngam
85	Braemar Hill	→	Siu Sai Wan (Island Resort)	Morning Peak Hours only
85A	Shau Kei Wan	→	Braemar Hill	Morning Peak Hours only, Available on School Days
85A	North Point Ferry Pier	→	Shau Kei Wan	Evening Peak Hours only, Available on School Days
85A	Aldrich Bay	→	Braemar Hill	Morning Peak Hours only, Available on School Days
85P	Siu Sai Wan (Harmony Garden)	→	Braemar Hill	Morning Peak Hours only, Available on School Days
85P	Braemar Hill	→	Siu Sai Wan (Island Resort)	Evening Peak Hours only, Available on School Days
88X	Siu Sai Wan (Island Resort)	↔	Kennedy Town (Belcher Bay)	Express; Peak Hours only
90	Ap Lei Chau Estate	↔	Central (Exchange Square)	Via Aberdeen Tunnel
90B	South Horizons	↔	Admiralty (East)	
90C	Ap Lei Chau Main Street	→	Central (Jardine House)	Morning Peak Hours only Via Aberdeen Tunnel
91	Ap Lei Chau Estate	↔	Central Ferry Piers	
91	South Horizons (Mei Hong Court)	→	Central Ferry Piers	Morning Peak Hours only
91	Tung Hing House Lei Tung Estate	→	Central Ferry Piers	Morning Peak Hours only
91A	Ap Lei Chau Estate	↔	Wah Fu (South)	Morning Peak Hours Only, Available on School Days
93	Ap Lei Chau Estate	→	Robinson Road	Morning Peak Hours only, Available on School Days
93	South Horizons	→	Robinson Road	Morning Peak Hours only, Available on School Days
93A	Lei Tung Estate	→	Robinson Road	Morning Peak Hours only, Available on School Days
93C	Tin Wan	→	Caine Road	Morning Peak Hours only, Available on School Days
93C	Ap Lei Chau Main Street	→	Caine Road	Morning Peak Hours only, Available on School Days
94A	Wah Fu (Central)	↺	Lei Tung Estate	Circular
95C	Ap Lei Chau (Lee Nam Road Industrial Area)	↺	Chi Fu Fa Yuen	Circular, weekdays Morning to Evening Special Service (evening journey terminates at Ap Lei Chau Estate)
95C	Ap Lei Chau Estate	↺	Chi Fu Fa Yuen	Circular, weekdays early morning (some journeys terminate at Lee Nam Road), night and holiday service
95C	Ap Lei Chau Estate	↺	Aberdeen (Lok Yeung Street)	Circular, weekdays A.M. Peak Hour Special Service
95P	Tin Wan	→	Ap Lei Chau Estate	Afternoon Peak Hours only, Available on School Days
97	Lei Tung Estate	↔	Central (Exchange Square)	Morning Peak Hours only Via Aberdeen Tunnel
98	Lei Tung Estate	↔	Aberdeen (Chengtu Road)	
99	South Horizons	↔	Shau Kei Wan	Via Aberdeen Tunnel
99X	South Horizons	→	Sai Wan Ho	Express; Morning Peak Hours only Via Aberdeen Tunnel
99X	Ap Lei Chau Main Street	→	Sai Wan Ho	Express; Morning Peak Hours only Via Aberdeen Tunnel
260	Stanley Prison	↔	Central (Exchange Square)	Express; Via Aberdeen Tunnel
314	Siu Sai Wan (Island Resort)	↔	Stanley Prison	Service on specified Sundays and Public Holidays only
511	Tai Hang Drive	→	Central Ferry Piers	Morning Peak Hours only
592	South Horizons	↔	Causeway Bay (Moreton Terrace)	Via Aberdeen Tunnel
595	South Horizons	↺	Shek Pai Wan	Circular
629	Central (Star Ferry)	→	Water World	Morning only Via Ocean Park; Via Aberdeen Tunnel
629M	Water World	→	Wong Chuk Hang station	Special departure
720	Sai Wan Ho (Grand Promenade)	↔	Central (Macau Ferry)	Eastern Corridor Express
720	Sai Wan Ho (Grand Promenade)	↺	Central (Wing Wo Street)	Express Circular; Morning Peak Hours only Eastern Corridor Express
720	Sai Wan Ho (Grand Promenade)	→	Central (Wing Wo Street)	Morning Peak Hours only Eastern Corridor Express
720A	Sai Wan Ho (Grand Promenade)	→	Admiralty (Admiralty Centre)	Express; Morning Peak Hours only Via Eastern Corridor
720A	Sai Wan Ho (Grand Promenade)	→	Central (Pedder Street)	Express; Morning Peak Hours only Via Eastern Corridor
720P	Cityplaza	↺	Central (Wing Wo Street)	Express Circular; Morning Peak Hours only Via Eastern Corridor
720P	Cityplaza	→	Central (Wing Wo Street)	Express; Morning Peak Hours only Via Eastern Corridor
720X	Sai Wan Ho (Grand Promenade)	→	Central (Rumsey Street)	Morning Peak Hours only Via Eastern Corridor
722	Yiu Tung Estate	↺	Central Ferry Piers	Express Circular; Eastern Corridor Express
722	Yiu Tung Estate	↺	Central (Pier 3)	Express Circular; Morning Peak Hours only Eastern Corridor Express
722	Yiu Tung Estate	→	Central (Exchange Square)	Morning Peak Hours only Eastern Corridor Express
770	Tin Wan	↔	Chai Wan (East)	Express; Via Aberdeen Tunnel
780	Chai Wan (East)	↔	Central Ferry Piers	Eastern Corridor Express
780P	Hing Wah	→	Central Ferry Piers	Morning Peak Hours only Via Eastern Corridor
788	Siu Sai Wan (Island Resort)	↔	Central Ferry Piers	Eastern Corridor Express
789	Siu Sai Wan (Island Resort)	↔	Admiralty (Rodney Street)	Eastern Corridor Express
H3	Central (Hong Kong Observation Wheel)	→	Stanley Market	
H4	Stanley Market	→	Central (Hong Kong Observation Wheel)	
H4	Ocean Park	→	Central (Hong Kong Observation Wheel)	
N8	Heng Fa Chuen	↺	Quarry Bay	Overnight Service; Circular; Via Shau Kei Wan, Yiu Tung
N8P	Siu Sai Wan (Island Resort)	↺	Wan Chai (Harbour Road)	Overnight Service; Circular; Eastern Corridor Express
N8X	Siu Sai Wan (Island Resort)	↔	Kennedy Town	Overnight Service; Via Shau Kei Wan
N72	Wah Kwai Estate	↔	Quarry Bay (Hoi Chak Street)	Overnight Service Via Aberdeen Tunnel
N90	South Horizons	↔	Central (Macau Ferry)	Overnight Service Via Aberdeen Tunnel
X8	Happy Valley (Upper)	→	Siu Sai Wan (Island Resort)	Express; Morning Peak Hours only Via Island Eastern Corridor
X9	Shek O	↔	Central (Star Ferry)	Weekends and Public Holidays only via North Point
X15	The Peak	↔	Central (Star Ferry)	Weekends and Public Holidays only

== Kowloon, New Kowloon and New Territories routes ==
=== Kowloon Motor Bus ===
==== Kowloon and New Kowloon routes ====
Route	Terminals			Type of service	Notes
1	Star Ferry	↔	Chuk Yuen Estate	Local	
1A	Star Ferry	↔	Sau Mau Ping (Central)	Local	
2	Star Ferry	↔	Cheung Sha Wan (So Uk Estate)	Local	
2A	Mei Foo	↔	Lok Wah	Local	
2B	Cheung Sha Wan	↔	Chuk Yuen Estate	Local	
2D	Chak On Estate	↔	Wong Tai Sin	Local	
2E	Kowloon City Ferry	↔	Pak Tin (North)	Local	
2F	Tsz Wan Shan (North)	↔	Cheung Sha Wan	Local	
2P	Cheung Sha Wan	→	Tsz Wan Shan (North)	Express	PM Peak hours only
2X	Mei Foo	↔	Choi Fook	Express	
3B	Hung Hom (Hung Luen Road)	↔	Tsz Wan Shan (Central)	Local	Peak hours only
3C	China Ferry Terminal	↔	Tsz Wan Shan (North)	Local	
3D	Kwun Tong (Yue Man Square)	↔	Tsz Wan Shan (Central)	Local	
3D	Kwun Tong (Yue Man Square)	↔	Tsz Wan Shan (South)	Local	AM Peak hours only
3M	Choi Wan	↔	Tsz Wan Shan (North)	Local	
3S	Diamond Hill station	↺	Diamond Hill Cemetery	Local	Selected days during the Ching Ming Festival and Chung Yeung Festival only
3X	Tsz Wan Shan (North)	↔	China Ferry Terminal	Express	Peak hours only
5	Star Ferry	↔	Fu Shan	Local	
5A	Star Ferry	↔	Kai Tak (Kai Ching Estate)	Local	
5C	Star Ferry	↔	Tsz Wan Shan (Central)	Local	
5C	Yuk Wah Street	→	Star Ferry	Local	AM Peak hours only
5D	Telford Gardens	↺	Hung Hom	Local	
5M	Kai Tak (Tak Long Estate)	↺	Kowloon Bay station	Local	
5P	Tsz Wan Shan (Central)	↔	Star Ferry	Local	Peak hours only
5R	Kai Tak Cruise Terminal	↺	Kwun Tong (apm)	Local	
6	Star Ferry	↔	Lai Chi Kok	Local	
6C	Kowloon City Ferry	↔	Mei Foo	Local	
6D	Mei Foo	↔	Ngau Tau Kok	Local	
6E	Cheung Sha Wan (So Uk Estate)	↔	Lei Yue Mun Estate	Local	Peak hours only
6F	Sham Shui Po (Lai Kok Estate)	↔	Kowloon City Ferry	Local	
6P	Cheung Sha Wan (So Uk Estate)	↔	Lei Yue Mun Estate	Local	Peak hours only
6R	Mei Foo	↺	Ngong Shuen Chau Naval Base	Express	Ngong Shuen Chau Naval Base open days only
7	Star Ferry	↔	Lok Fu	Local	
7B	Hung Hom (Hung Luen Road)	↔	Lok Fu	Local	
7M	Lok Fu	↺	Chuk Yuen Estate	Local	
8	Star Ferry	↔	Kowloon station	Local	
8P	Laguna Verde	↺	Tsim Sha Tsui	Local	
9	Choi Fook	↔	Tsim Sha Tsui East (Mody Road)	Local	
10	Choi Wan	↺	Tai Kok Tsui	Local	
11	Kowloon station	↔	Tsz Wan Shan (Central)	Local	
11	Diamond Hill station	→	Kowloon station	Local	AM Peak hours only
11A	Chuk Yuen Estate	→	Kai Tak Hospital	Local	Specific service hours only
11B	Kwun Tong (Tsui Ping Road)	↔	Kowloon City Ferry	Local	
11C	Sau Mau Ping (Upper)	↔	Chuk Yuen Estate	Local	
11D	Lok Fu	↔	Kwun Tong Ferry	Local	
11K	Chuk Yuen Estate	↔	Hung Hom station	Local	
11X	On Tai (North)	↔	Hung Hom station	Express	
12	Hoi Lai Estate	↔	Tsim Sha Tsui East (Mody Road)	Local	
12A	Whampoa Garden	↔	Cheung Sha Wan (Hoi Tat Estate)	Local	
13	Anderson	↔	Sham Shui Po (Yen Chow Street)	Local	
13D	Island Harbourview	↔	Po Tat	Local	
13M	Kwun Tong (Elegance Road)	↺	Po Tat	Local	
13M	Po Tat	→	Kwun Tong station	Local	AM Peak hours only
13P	Po Tat	→	Lai Kok	Local	AM Peak hours only
13X	Tsim Sha Tsui East	↔	Po Tat	Express	
13X	Choi Fook	→	Tsim Sha Tsui East	Express	AM Peak hours only
14	China Ferry Terminal	↔	Lei Yue Mun Estate	Local	
14B	Ngau Tau Kok	↔	Lam Tin (Kwong Tin Estate)	Local	
14B	Lok Wah	→	Lam Tin (Kwong Tin Estate)	Local	AM Peak hours only
14D	Choi Hung	↔	Yau Tong	Local	Peak hours only
14D	Lam Tin (Kwong Tin Estate)	→	Choi Hung	Local	AM Peak hours only
14H	Yau Tong	↺	Shun Lee	Local	
14S	Yau Tong	↔	Tseung Kwan O Chinese Permanent Cemetery	Local	Circular route, Selected days during the Ching Ming Festival and Chung Yeung Festival only
14X	Yau Tong (Shung Tak Wai)	↺	Tsim Sha Tsui	Express	
14X	Lei Yue Mun	↺	Tsim Sha Tsui	Express	
15	Hung Hom (Hung Luen Road)	↔	Ping Tin	Local	
15A	Tsz Wan Shan (North)	↔	Ping Tin	Local	
15X	Lam Tin (Kwong Tin Estate)	↔	Hung Hom station	Express	Peak hours only
16	Lam Tin (Kwong Tin Estate)	↔	Mong Kok (Park Avenue)	Local	
16	Ping Tin	→	Mong Kok (Park Avenue)	Local	AM Peak hours only
16M	Kwun Tong (Yue Man Square)	↺	Lam Tin (Hong Wah Court)	Local	
16P	Mong Kok (Park Avenue)	↔	Kwun Tong Ferry	Express	Peak hours only
16X	Lam Tin (Kwong Tin Estate)	↔	Mong Kok (Park Avenue)	Express	Peak hours only
17	Kwun Tong (Yue Man Square)	↔	Oi Man	Local	
17A	Oi Man	→	Kai Tak Hospital	Local	Specific service hours only
17P	Shun Tin	→	Oi Man	Local	AM Peak hours only
18	Cheung Sha Wan (Hoi Tat Estate)	↺	Oi Man	Local	
19	Anderson	↔	Diamond Hill	Local	
21	Choi Wan	↔	Hung Hom station	Local	
23	Kwun Tong Ferry	↺	Shun Lee	Local	
23	Shun Tin	→	Kwun Tong Ferry	Local	AM Peak hours only
23M	Lok Wah	↺	Shun Lee	Local	
24	Kai Yip	↺	Mong Kok	Local	
26	Shun Tin	↔	Tsim Sha Tsui East	Local	
26M	Choi Hung	↺	Kwun Tong	Local	
26X	Shun Tin	↔	Tsim Sha Tsui East	Express	Peak hours only
27	Shun Tin	↺	Mong Kok	Local	
27X	Shun Tin	↔	Olympic station	Express	Peak hours only
28	Star Ferry	↔	Lok Wah	Local	
28B	Choi Fook	↔	Kai Tak (Kai Ching Estate)	Local	
28S	Kwun Tong (Yue Man Square)	→	Lok Wah	Local	AM Peak hours only
29M	Shun Lee	↺	San Po Kong	Local	
203C	Tai Hang Tung	↔	Tsim Sha Tsui East (Mody Road)	Local	
203E	Choi Hung	↔	Kowloon station	Local	
203S	Chak On Estate	→	Tsim Sha Tsui East (Mody Road)	Local	AM Peak hours only
208	Tsim Sha Tsui East	↔	Broadcast Drive	Local	
211	Tsui Chuk Garden	↺	Wong Tai Sin station	Local	
211A	Lok Fu	↺	Tsui Chuk Garden	Local	Sundays and Holidays only
213A	On Tat	→	Choi Hung station	Local	AM Peak hours only
213B	On Tai	→	Kwun Tong	Local	AM Peak hours only
213D	Sau Mau Ping (Central)	↺	Mong Kok	Local	
213E	Anderson	↔	Kowloon station	Express	Specific service hours only
213M	On Tai	↺	Lam Tin station	Local	
213S	On Tat	↺	Lam Tin station	Local	AM Peak hours only
213X	On Tai (South)	↺	Tsim Sha Tsui	Express	
214	Yau Tong	↔	Cheung Sha Wan (Kom Tsun Street)	Local	
214	Po Tat	→	Lai Chi Kok station	Local	AM Peak hours only
214P	On Sau Road	→	Lai Chi Kok station	Local	AM Peak hours only
215P	Lam Tin (Kwong Tin Estate)	→	Kowloon station	Express	AM Peak hours only
215R	Hong Kong Coliseum	→	Shun Tin	Local	After large events at Hong Kong Coliseum only
215X	Kowloon station	↔	Lam Tin (Kwong Tin Estate)	Express	
216M	Lam Tin station	↺	Yau Tong station	Local	
219X	Laguna City	↺	Tsim Sha Tsui	Express	
219X	Ko Ling Road	↺	Tsim Sha Tsui	Express	AM Peak hours only
224R	Hong Kong Coliseum	→	Wong Tai Sin	Local	After large events at Hong Kong Coliseum only
224X	Kai Yip	↺	Tsim Sha Tsui East	Express	Peak hours only
224X	Kai Tak	↺	Tsim Sha Tsui East	Express	AM Peak hours only
HK1	Star Ferry	↺	Wong Tai Sin	Local	Discovery tour
HK1	Star Ferry	↺	Mong Kok	Local	Highlight tour
N3D	Kwun Tong (Yue Man Square)	↔	Tsz Wan Shan (Central)	Local	Night service
N213	Tsim Sha Tsui East (Mody Road)	→	On Tai (West)	Local	Night service
N214	Yau Tong	→	Mei Foo	Local	Dawn only
N216	Hung Hom station	↔	Yau Tong	Local	Night service
W2	Jordan (West Kowloon station)	↺	Lam Tin station	Express	
W2	Millennium City	→	Jordan (West Kowloon station)	Express	Dawn only
W2	Jordan (West Kowloon station)	→	Laguna Park	Express	Special departure
W4	High Speed Rail (West Kowloon station)	↺	Tsim Sha Tsui East	Local	Weekends and public holidays only
X6C	Mei Foo	↔	Kai Tak Hospital	Express	Weekdays only

==== New Territories routes ====
Route	Terminals			Type of service	Notes
30	Tsuen Wan (Allway Gardens)	↔	Cheung Sha Wan	Local	
30X	Tsuen Wan (Allway Gardens)	↔	Whampoa Garden	Express	
31	Tsuen Wan West station	↺	Shek Lei (Lei Pui Street)	Local	
31A	Kwai Chung Estate	→	Shek Lei (Tai Loong Street)	Local	AM Peak Hours only
31B	Olympic station	↔	Shek Lei (Tai Loong Street)	Local	
31M	Kwai Fong station	↔	Shek Lei (Lei Pui Street)	Local	
31P	Shek Lei Commercial Complex	→	Kwai Fong station	Local	AM Peak Hours only
32	Shek Wai Kok	↔	Olympic station	Local	
32H	Cheung Shan	↔	Lai Chi Kok	Local	
32M	Kwai Fong station	↺	Cheung Shan	Local	
32P	Tsuen Wan (Castle Peak Road)	↔	Yuen Yuen Institute	Local	Selected days during the Ching Ming Festival and Chung Yeung Festival only
33	Tsuen Wan West station	↔	Yau Tong	Express	Weekdays only
33A	Mong Kok (Park Avenue)	↔	Tsuen Wan (Nina Tower)	Local	
33B	Tsuen Wan West station	↔	Yau Tong	Express	Weekends and public holidays only
33R	Tsuen Wan (Discovery Park)	↔	Pak Tam Chung	Express	Weekends and public holidays only
33X	Tsuen Wan West station	↔	Yau Tong	Express	Peak Hours only
34	Kwai Shing (Central)	↔	Tsuen Wan (Bayview Garden)	Local	
34M	Tsuen Wan (Bayview Garden)	↺	Tsuen Wan station	Local	
35A	Tsim Sha Tsui East	↔	On Yam	Local	
35X	On Yam	↔	Tsim Sha Tsui East	Express	Peak Hours only
36	Tsuen Wan West station	↺	Lei Muk Shue	Local	
36	Lei Muk Shue	→	Tsuen Wan West station	Local	AM Peak Hours only
36A	Lei Muk Shue	↺	Cheung Sha Wan (Hoi Tat Estate)	Local	
36B	Lei Muk Shue	↔	Jordan (West Kowloon station)	Local	
36M	Lei Muk Shue	↔	Kwai Fong station	Local	
36R	Hong Kong Coliseum	→	Shek Wai Kok	Local	After large events at Hong Kong Coliseum only
36X	Lei Muk Shue	↔	Tsim Sha Tsui East (Mody Road)	Express	Peak Hours only
37	Olympic station	↔	Kwai Shing (Central)	Local	
37M	Kwai Hing station	↺	Kwai Shing (Central)	Local	
37X	Kwai Chung Estate	→	Yau Ma Tei	Express	AM Peak Hours only
38	Kwai Shing (East)	↔	Ping Tin	Express	
38A	Mei Foo	↔	Riviera Gardens	Local	
38B	Riviera Gardens	↔	Shek Mun Estate	Express	Peak Hours only
38P	Kwai Shing (Central)	↔	Ping Tin	Express	Peak Hours only
38S	Kwai Fong station	↔	Tsuen Wan Chinese Permanent Cemetery	Local	Selected days during the Ching Ming Festival and Chung Yeung Festival only
39A	Tsuen Wan West station	↺	Allway Gardens	Local	
39M	Allway Gardens	↺	Tsuen Wan station	Local	
40	Tsuen Wan (Belvedere Garden)	↔	Laguna City	Local	
40A	Kwai Hing station	→	Ping Tin	Local	PM Peak Hours only
40B	Kwai Chung Estate	→	Ping Tin	Local	AM Peak Hours only
40E	Nai Chung	→	Kwai Fong Estate	Express	AM Peak Hours only
40E	Kwai Fong (South)	→	Nai Chung	Express	PM Peak Hours only
40P	Tsuen Wan (Nina Tower)	↔	Kwun Tong Ferry Pier	Local	
40P	Shek Yam East Estate	→	Kwun Tong Ferry Pier	Local	AM Peak Hours only
40X	Wu Kai Sha station	↔	Kwai Chung Estate	Express	
40X	Wu Kai Sha station	→	Kwai Fong (South)	Express	AM Peak Hours only
41A	Tsim Sha Tsui East	↔	Cheung On	Express	
41M	Tsuen Wan station	↔	Tsing Yi Ferry	Local	
41R	Hong Kong Coliseum	→	Cheung Ching	Local	After large events at Hong Kong Coliseum only
42	Cheung Hong	↔	Shun Lee	Local	
42A	Cheung Hang	↔	Jordan (West Kowloon station)	Local	
42C	Cheung Hang	↔	Lam Tin station	Express	
42M	Cheung Wang	↔	Tsuen Wan (Discovery Park)	Local	
43	Cheung Hong	↔	Tsuen Wan West station	Local	
43A	Cheung Wang	↔	Shek Lei (Tai Loong Street)	Local	
43B	Cheung Ching	↔	Tsuen Wan West station	Local	
43C	Cheung Hong	→	Island Harbourview	Local	AM Peak Hours only
43C	Island Harbourview	→	Cheung Hang	Local	PM Peak Hours only
43D	Cheung Wang	→	Kwai Shing	Local	AM Peak Hours only
43M	Kwai Fong station	↺	Cheung Ching	Local	
43P	Tsuen Wan West station	↔	Hong Kong Science Park	Express	Peak Hours only
43S	Shek Yam	↔	Hong Kong Science Park	Express	Peak Hours only
43X	Tsuen Wan West station	↔	Ma On Shan (Yiu On Estate)	Express	
43X	Po Tai Street	→	Tsuen Wan West station	Express	AM Peak Hours only
44	Mong Kok East station	↔	Tsing Yi Estate	Local	
44M	Tsing Yi station	↔	Kwai Chung Estate	Local	
44M	Cheung On	→	Kwai Hing station	Local	AM Peak Hours Only
45	Lai Yiu	↔	Kowloon City Ferry	Local	
46	Lai Yiu	↔	Jordan (West Kowloon station)	Local	
46P	Mei Tin	↔	Kwai Fong station	Express	Peak Hours only
46R	Tai Wai station	↔	Ngong Shuen Chau Naval Base	Express	Ngong Shuen Chau Naval Base open days only
46S	Hin Keng	↔	Tsuen Wan (Nina Tower)	Express	Peak Hours only
46X	Hin Keng	↔	Mei Foo	Express	
47A	Shui Chuen O	↔	Kwai Fong (South)	Express	
47X	Chun Shek	↔	Kwai Shing (East)	Express	
47X	Sun Tin Wai	→	Kwai Shing (East)	Express	AM Peak Hours only
48P	Fo Tan Chun Yeung Estate	↔	Tsing Lung Tau	Express	Peak Hours only
48X	Wo Che	↔	Bayview Garden	Express	
49	Ching Fu Court	↔	Tseung Kwan O Industrial Estate	Express	Peak Hours only
49A	Ching Fu Court	↔	Tsuen Wan West station	Local	Peak Hours only
49M	Ching Fu Court	↺	Tsing Yi station	Local	
49P	Sha Tin Central	→	Tsing Yi Ferry	Express	PM Peak Hours only
49X	Kwong Yuen	↔	Tsing Yi Ferry	Express	
49X	Shek Mun Estate	→	Tsing Yi Ferry	Express	AM Peak Hours only
51	Tsuen Wan (Nina Tower)	↺	Sheung Tsuen	Local	
52P	So Kwun Wat	→	Mong Kok (Park Avenue)	Express	AM Peak Hours only
52S	Tuen Mun Road Interchange	↔	Tsang Tsui	Local	Selected days during the Chung Yeung Festival only
52X	Tuen Mun Central	↔	Mong Kok (Park Avenue)	Express	
53	Tsuen Wan (Nina Tower)	↔	Yuen Long station	Local	
54	Yuen Long (West)	↺	Sheung Tsuen	Local	
56S	Tuen Mun station	↔	Tsang Tsui	Local	Selected days during the Ching Ming Festival and Chung Yeung Festival only
57M	Tuen Mun (Shan King)	↔	Lai King (North)	Express	
58M	Tuen Mun (Leung King Estate)	↔	Kwai Fong station	Express	
58M	Kin Sang	→	Kwai Fong station	Express	AM Peak Hours only
58M	Po Tin	→	Kwai Fong station	Express	AM Peak Hours only
58P	Kwai Fong station	→	Tin King Estate (Tin Yue House)	Express	PM Peak Hours only
58X	Tuen Mun (Leung King Estate)	↔	Mong Kok East station	Express	
58X	Kin Sang	→	Mong Kok East station	Express	AM Peak Hours only
59A	Tuen Mun Pier Head	↔	Kwai Fong (Kwai Tsui Estate)	Express	Peak Hours only
59M	Tuen Mun Pier Head	↔	Tsuen Wan station	Express	
59M	Sun Tuen Mun Centre	→	Tsuen Wan station	Express	AM Peak Hours only
59M	Yuet Wu Villa	→	Tsuen Wan station	Express	AM Peak Hours only
59X	Tuen Mun Pier Head	↔	Mong Kok East station	Express	
59X	Sun Tuen Mun Centre	→	Mong Kok East station	Express	AM Peak Hours only
59X	Lung Mun Oasis	→	Mong Kok East station	Express	AM Peak Hours only
60M	Tuen Mun station	↔	Tsuen Wan station	Express	
60R	Tuen Mun Central	↔	K.M.B. Tuen Mun Depot	Local	K.M.B. Tuen Mun Depot Open Days Only
60X	Tuen Mun Central	↔	Jordan (West Kowloon station)	Express	
61M	Tuen Mun (Hoi Wing Road)	↔	Lai King (North)	Express	
61P	So Kwun Wat	↔	Tsuen Wan station	Express	Peak Hours only
61S	Wo Hop Shek	↔	Tuen Mun Central	Local	Ching Ming Festival and Chung Yeung Festival only
61X	Tuen Mun Central	↔	Kowloon City Ferry Pier	Express	
62P	Tuen Mun Central	→	Lei Yue Mun Estate	Express	AM Peak Hours only
62X	Siu Hong station (South)	↔	Lei Yue Mun Estate	Express	
63	Long Tin Court	↔	Tuen Mun Road BBI	Express	
63R	Tai Po Market station	↔	Lam Tsuen	Express	Chinese New Year only
63X	Hung Shui Kiu (Hung Fuk Estate)	↔	Jordan (West Kowloon station)	Express	
64K	Yuen Long (West)	↔	Tai Po Market station	Local	
64K	Ng Tung Chai (Pak Ngau Shek)	→	Tai Wo	Local	AM Peak Hours only
64K	Sheung Tsuen Playground	→	Yuen Long (West)	Local	AM Peak Hours only
64P	Tai Po Market station	→	Kadoorie Farm	Local	PM Peak Hours only
64S	Sheung Tsuen Playground	→	Kam Sheung Road station	Local	AM Peak Hours only
64X	Hung Shui Kiu (Hung Yuen Road)	→	Hong Kong Science Park Phase III	Express	AM Peak Hours only
65K	Ng Tung Chai (Pak Ngau Shek)	→	Tai Po Central	Local	AM Peak Hours only
65X	Tin Yan Estate	→	Hong Kong Science Park Phase III	Express	AM Peak Hours only
66M	Tai Hing	↔	Tsuen Wan (Nina Tower)	Express	
66X	Tai Hing	↔	Olympic station	Express	
67M	Po Tin	↔	Kwai Fong station	Express	
67M	Siu Hong Court	→	Kwai Fong station	Express	AM Peak Hours only
67M	Po Tin	→	Tuen Mun Government Secondary School	Local	AM Peak Hours only
67X	Siu Hong Court	↔	Mong Kok East station	Express	
68	Park YOHO	↺	YOHO Mall	Local	
68A	Long Ping Estate	↔	Tsing Yi station	Express	
68E	Yuen Long Park	↔	Tsing Yi station	Express	
68F	Park YOHO	↺	Yuen Long Park	Local	
68M	Yuen Long (West)	↔	Tsuen Wan station	Express	
68R	Yuen Long (Yoho Mall)	↔	Tai Tong	Express	Only for special events that are held in Tai Tong.
68X	Hung Shui Kiu (Hung Fuk Estate)	↔	Mong Kok (Park Avenue)	Express	
68X	Yuen Long (West)	→	Mong Kok (Park Avenue)	Express	AM Peak Hours only
68X	Yuet Ping House Long Ping Estate	→	Mong Kok (Park Avenue)	Express	AM Peak Hours only
69	Tin Shui Wai Town Centre	↔	Yuen Long (Tak Yip Street)	Local	
69C	Tin Yan Estate	↔	Kwun Tong Ferry Pier	Express	Peak Hours only
69M	Tin Shui Wai Town Centre	↔	Kwai Fong station	Express	
69P	Tin Shui Wai station	→	Kwai Fong station	Express	AM Peak Hours only
69X	Tin Shui	↔	Jordan (West Kowloon station)	Express	
69X	Tin Yiu	→	Jordan (West Kowloon station)	Express	AM Peak Hours only
70K	Fanling (Wah Ming)	↺	Sheung Shui (Ching Ho Estate)	Local	
70K	Sheung Shui (Ching Ho Estate)	→	Fanling (Wah Ming)	Local	Dawn only
70S	Wo Hop Shek	↔	Hung Hom station	Local	Ching Ming Festival and Chung Yeung Festival only
71A	Tai Po (Fu Heng)	↔	Tai Po Market station	Local	
71B	Tai Po (Fu Heng)	↺	Tai Po Central	Local	
71K	Tai Wo	↔	Tai Po Market station	Local	
71S	Tai Po (Fu Shin)	↺	Kwong Fuk	Local	Sundays and public holidays only
72	Cheung Sha Wan	↔	Tai Wo	Local	
72A	Tai Wai station	↔	Tai Po Industrial Estate	Local	
72C	Tai Mei Tuk	→	Tai Po Market station	Local	AM Peak Hours only
72K	Fu Tip Estate	↺	Tai Po (Tai Wo)	Local	
72X	Fu Tip Estate	↔	Mong Kok (Park Avenue)	Express	
73	Wah Ming	↔	Tai Po Industrial Estate	Local	Weekdays morning to evening only
73	Wah Ming	↔	Tai Po Central	Local	Weekdays early night, weekends and holidays only
73A	Wah Ming	↔	Yu Chui Court	Local	
73B	Nethersole Hospital	↺	Sheung Shui	Local	
73B	Union Plaza	→	Nethersole Hospital	Local	AM Peak Hours only
73B	Nethersole Hospital	→	Sheung Shui station	Local	PM Peak Hours only
73D	Kwong Fuk Market	→	Tsuen Wan (Nina Tower)	Express	AM Peak Hours only
73D	Tsuen Wan (Nina Tower)	→	Fu Shin Estate	Express	PM Peak Hours only
73F	Education University of Hong Kong	↔	Tsuen Wan (Nina Tower)	Express	Peak Hours only
73K	Sheung Shui	↔	Man Kam To	Local	
73P	Tai Mei Tuk	↔	Tsuen Wan (Nina Tower)	Express	Peak Hours only
73S	Wo Hop Shek (Kiu Tau Road)	↔	Fanling station	Local	Selected days during the Ching Ming Festival and Chung Yeung Festival only
73X	Fu Shin Estate	↔	Tsuen Wan (Nina Tower)	Express	
74	Fu Tip Estate	↔	Yau Tong	Express	Peak Hours only
74A	Tai Wo	↔	Kai Yip	Local	
74B	Tai Po Central	→	Kwun Tong Ferry Pier	Express	AM Peak Hours only
74B	Kowloon Bay	→	Tai Po Central	Express	PM Peak Hours only
74C	Kau Lung Hang	→	Kwun Tong Ferry Pier	Express	AM Peak Hours only
74D	Kau Lung Hang	↔	Kwun Tong Ferry Pier	Express	via Hong Kong Science Park
74E	Tai Mei Tuk	↔	Kwun Tong Ferry Pier	Express	Peak Hours only
74F	Education University of Hong Kong	↔	Kwun Tong Ferry Pier	Express	Peak Hours only
74K	Tai Po Market station	↺	Sam Mun Tsai	Local	via Education University of Hong Kong
74P	Tai Po Central	↔	Kwun Tong Ferry Pier	Express	Peak Hours only, via Hong Kong Science Park
74P	Hong Kong Science Park Phase III	→	Kwun Tong Ferry Pier	Express	PM Peak Hours only
74R	Tai Wo	↔	Pak Tam Chung	Express	Weekends and public holidays only
74S	Wo Hop Shek	↔	Ping Tin	Local	Ching Ming Festival and Chung Yeung Festival only
74X	Tai Po Central	↔	Kwun Tong Ferry Pier	Express	
74X	Wan Tau Tong	→	Kwun Tong Ferry Pier	Express	AM Peak Hours only
74X	Kwong Fuk	→	Kwun Tong Ferry Pier	Express	AM Peak Hours only
75F	Tai Po Market station	↔	Education University of Hong Kong	Local	Peak Hours only
75K	Tai Mei Tuk	↔	Tai Po Market station	Local	
75P	Tai Mei Tuk	→	Tai Po Market station	Express	AM Peak Hours only
75X	Fu Shin Estate	↔	Kowloon City Ferry Pier	Express	
76	Yau Pok Road Light Public Housing (South)	↺	Sheung Shui station	Local	
76A	Sheung Shui station	↺	Kwu Tung North	Local	Specific Service Hours only
76K	Long Ping Estate	↔	Ching Ho Estate	Local	
76K	Wah Ming	→	Long Ping Estate	Local	AM Peak Hours only
76S	Wo Hop Shek	↔	Fanling station	Local	Selected days during the Ching Ming Festival and Chung Yeung Festival only
77	Fung Wong Leng Estate	↔	Tai Ping	Local	
77K	Yuen Long (Fung Cheung Road)	↔	Sheung Shui	Local	
77K	Sheung Shui	→	Yuen Long (West)	Local	AM Peak Hours only
77K	Sheung Shui	→	Pat Heung Road	Local	AM Peak Hours only
78	Sha Tau Kok	→	Tai Ping	Express	AM Peak Hours only
78A	Queen's Hill	↺	Fanling station	Local	
78A	Shan Lai Court	→	Fanling station	Local	AM Peak Hours only
78A	Fanling Centre	→	Queen's Hill	Local	PM Peak Hours only
78B	Queen's Hill	↔	Choi Yuen	Local	Peak Hours only
78K	Tai Ping	↔	Sha Tau Kok	Local	
78K	Sha Tau Kok	→	Wah Ming	Local	AM Peak Hours only
79K	Choi Shek Estate	↔	Ta Kwu Ling (Tsung Yuen Ha)	Local	
79K	Ta Kwu Ling (Tsung Yuen Ha)	↔	Fanling station	Local	Special departures, omit Luen Wo Hui
80	Mei Lam	↔	Kwun Tong Ferry Pier	Local	
80A	Mei Lam	→	Kwun Tong Ferry Pier	Local	AM Peak Hours only
80K	Sun Chui	↔	Yu Chui Court	Local	
80P	Hin Keng	→	Kwun Tong Ferry Pier	Local	AM Peak Hours only
80X	Chun Shek	↔	Kwun Tong Ferry Pier	Express	
80X	Jat Min Chuen Street	→	Kwun Tong Ferry Pier	Express	AM Peak Hours only
80X	Sun Tin Wai	→	Kwun Tong Ferry Pier	Express	AM Peak Hours only
81	Wo Che	↔	Jordan (West Kowloon station)	Local	
81C	Yiu On	↔	Tsim Sha Tsui East (Mody Road)	Local	
81K	Sui Wo Court	↔	Sun Tin Wai	Local	
82B	Mei Tin	→	Tai Wai station	Local	AM Peak Hours only
82C	Kwong Yuen	↔	Hong Kong Science Park Phase III	Local	Peak Hours only
82D	Tai Wai station	↔	Pak Shek Kok	Express	Peak Hours only
82K	Mei Tin	↔	Yu Chui Court	Local	
82X	Ravana Garden	↺	Wong Tai Sin	Express	Peak Hours only
83A	Shui Chuen O	→	Kwun Tong Ferry Pier	Express	AM Peak Hours only
83K	Wong Nai Tau	↺	Sha Tin Central	Local	
83K	Shek Mun Estate	→	Sha Tin Central	Local	AM Peak Hours only
83P	Wong Nai Tau	→	Wo Che	Local	AM Peak Hours only
83S	Wong Nai Tau	↔	Sha Tin Central	Local	Peak Hours only
83X	Shui Chuen O	↔	Kwun Tong Ferry Pier	Express	Non-Peak Hours only
83X	Wong Nai Tau	↔	Kwun Tong Ferry Pier	Express	AM Peak Hours only
84M	Chevalier Garden	↺	Lok Fu	Express	
84M	Chevalier Garden	↔	Lok Fu	Express	Peak Hours only
85	Fo Tan Chun Yeung Estate	↔	Kowloon City Ferry Pier	Local	
85A	Kwong Yuen	↔	Kowloon City Ferry Pier	Local	
85B	Chun Shek	→	Kowloon City Ferry Pier	Local	AM Peak Hours only
85K	Heng On	↔	Sha Tin station	Local	
85K	Heng On	→	Sha Tin station	Local	AM Peak Hours only
85M	Kam Ying Court	↺	Wong Tai Sin	Express	
85P	Nai Chung	↔	Hung Hom (Hung Luen Road)	Express	Peak Hours only
85S	Yiu On	→	Hung Hom (Hung Luen Road)	Express	AM Peak Hours only
85X	Ma On Shan Town Centre	↔	Hung Hom (Hung Luen Road)	Express	
86	Wong Nai Tau	↔	Mei Foo	Local	
86A	Sha Tin Wai	↔	Cheung Sha Wan (Kom Tsun Street)	Local	
86C	Lee On	↔	Cheung Sha Wan	Local	
86K	Kam Ying Court	↔	Sha Tin station	Local	
86S	Kam Ying Court	↔	Sha Tin station	Local	Peak Hours only
87B	Island Harbourview	↔	Sun Tin Wai	Local	
87C	Kam Ying Court	↔	Hung Hom station	Express	Specific Service Hours only
87D	Kam Ying Court	↔	Hung Hom station	Express	
87D	Ma On Shan Town Centre	→	Hung Hom station	Express	AM Peak Hours only
87E	Nai Chung	→	Tsim Sha Tsui (Middle Road)	Express	AM Peak Hours only
87E	Tsim Sha Tsui East (Mody Road)	→	Nai Chung	Express	PM Peak Hours only
87K	University station	↺	Kam Ying Court	Local	
87K	Kam Ying Court	→	University station	Local	Dawn only
87K	Ma On Shan Town Centre	→	University station	Local	AM Peak Hours only
87K	University station	→	Lee On	Local	Night service
87P	Lee On	→	Chung On	Local	AM Peak Hours only
87R	Hong Kong Coliseum	→	Wu Kai Sha Station	Express	After large events at Hong Kong Coliseum only
87S	Kam Ying Court	↺	University station	Local	Peak Hours only
88	Tai Wai station	↔	Sau Mau Ping (Central)	Express	
88K	Hin Keng	↔	Royal Ascot	Local	
88X	Sui Wo Court	↔	Ping Tin	Express	via Yau Tong
89	Lek Yuen	↔	Kwun Tong (Tsui Ping North Estate)	Local	
89B	Sha Tin Wai	↔	Choi Hung	Local	Peak Hours only
89C	Heng On	↔	Kwun Tong (Tsui Ping Road)	Express	
89D	Wu Kai Sha station	↔	Lam Tin station	Express	
89P	Ma On Shan Town Centre	→	Lam Tin station	Express	AM Peak Hours only
89P	Yiu Him House Yiu On Estate	→	Lam Tin station	Express	AM Peak Hours only
89S	Shui Chuen O	↔	Wu Kai Sha station	Local	
89X	Sha Tin station	↔	Kwun Tong (Tsui Ping Road)	Express	
90	Shek Mun Estate	→	Choi Ming	Express	Peak Hours only
91	Diamond Hill station	↔	Clear Water Bay	Local	
91	Choi Hung	→	Clear Water Bay	Local	Dawn only
91B	Hang Hau station	→	Hong Kong University of Science and Technology	Local	AM Peak Hours only
91M	Diamond Hill station	↔	Po Lam	Local	
91M	Hong Kong University of Science and Technology (North)	→	Po Lam	Local	PM Peak Hours only
91P	Diamond Hill station	→	Hong Kong University of Science and Technology	Local	AM Peak Hours only
91P	Hong Kong University of Science and Technology (South)	→	Choi Hung station	Local	PM Peak Hours only
91R	Clear Water Bay	→	Choi Ming	Local	Specified weekends and Public Holidays only
91S	Clear Water Bay	→	Kwun Tong	Local	AM Peak Hours only
92	Diamond Hill station	↔	Sai Kung	Local	
92R	Star Ferry	→	Sai Kung	Express	Sundays and Public Holidays only
92R	Sai Kung	→	Yau Ma Tei	Express	Sundays and Public Holidays only
93A	Po Lam	↔	Kwun Tong Ferry Pier	Local	
93K	Tsui Lam	↔	Mong Kok East station	Local	
93M	Choi Ming	→	Po Lam	Local	AM Peak Hours only, via Lam Tin
93P	Po Lam	↔	Mong Kok (Park Avenue)	Express	Peak Hours only
94	Sai Kung	↔	Wong Shek Pier	Local	
95	Kowloon station	↔	Tsui Lam	Local	
96	Hong Sing Garden	↔	Tai Po Industrial Estate	Express	Specific Service Hours only
96	Park Central	→	Tai Po Industrial Estate	Express	PM Peak Hours only
96R	Diamond Hill station	↔	Wong Shek Pier	Local	Sundays and public holidays only
97	Hong Sing Garden	↔	Wu Kai Sha station	Express	Peak Hours only
98	Tseung Kwan O Industrial Estate	↺	Ngau Tau Kok station	Local	
98	Tseung Kwan O Industrial Estate	→	Ngau Tau Kok station	Local	PM Peak Hours only
98A	Hang Hau (North) (Tseung Kwan O Hospital)	↺	Ngau Tau Kok station	Local	
98A	Ngau Tau Kok station	→	Hang Hau (North) (Tseung Kwan O Hospital)	Local	PM Peak Hours only
98C	Hang Hau (North) (Tseung Kwan O Hospital)	↔	Mei Foo	Express	
98D	Hang Hau (North) (Tseung Kwan O Hospital)	↔	Tsim Sha Tsui East	Express	
98D	LOHAS Park station	→	Tsim Sha Tsui East	Express	AM Peak Hours only
98E	Hang Hau (North) (Tseung Kwan O Hospital)	↔	Mei Foo	Express	Peak Hours only
98P	Hong Sing Garden	→	Tsim Sha Tsui East	Express	AM Peak Hours only
98P	Tsim Sha Tsui East	→	Hang Hau (North) (Tseung Kwan O Hospital)	Express	PM Peak Hours only
98R	Hong Kong Coliseum	→	Hang Hau (North) (Tseung Kwan O Hospital)	Express	After large events at Hong Kong Coliseum only
98S	Hang Hau (North) (Tseung Kwan O Hospital)	↔	Mei Foo	Express	Peak Hours only
99	Heng On	↔	Sai Kung	Local	
99R	University station	↔	Sai Kung (North)	Local	Sundays and public holidays only
230R	Ma Wan (Pak Yan Road)	↔	Kowloon station	Express	
230X	Allway Gardens	→	Whampoa Garden	Express	AM Peak Hours only
234A	Sea Crest Villa	↔	Tsuen Wan West station	Express	via Tuen Mun Road
234A	Tsing Lung Tau Tsuen	→	Tsuen Wan West station	Express	AM Peak Hours only
234B	Sea Crest Villa	↔	Tsuen Wan West station	Local	via Castle Peak Road
234C	Tsing Lung Tau	↔	Kwun Tong (Tsui Ping North Estate)	Express	Peak Hours only
234D	Tsing Lung Tau	↔	Kwun Tong (Tsui Ping North Estate)	Express	Peak Hours only
234P	Bayview Garden	→	Star Ferry	Express	AM Peak Hours only
234X	Bayview Garden	↔	Tsim Sha Tsui East (Mody Road)	Express	
235	Kwai Chung (On Yam)	↺	Tsuen Wan	Local	
235M	Kwai Chung (On Yam)	↔	Kwai Fong station	Local	
238M	Tsuen Wan (Riviera Gardens)	↔	Tsuen Wan station	Local	
238P	Tsuen Wan (Riviera Gardens)	→	China Ferry Terminal	Express	AM Peak Hours only
238X	Tsuen Wan (Riviera Gardens)	↔	China Ferry Terminal	Express	
240X	Wong Nai Tau	↔	Kwai Hing station	Express	Peak Hours only
241X	Cheung Ching	↔	Kowloon City Ferry	Express	
242X	Cheung Hang	→	Tsim Sha Tsui (Middle Road)	Express	AM Peak Hours only
242X	Tsim Sha Tsui East (Mody Road)	→	Cheung Hang	Express	PM Peak Hours only
243M	Mayfair Gardens	↔	Tsuen Wan (Discovery Park)	Local	
243P	Mayfair Gardens	→	Tsuen Wan (Allway Gardens)	Local	AM Peak Hours only
248M	Tsing Yi station	↺	Cheung Wang	Local	
249M	Tsing Yi station	↺	Mayfair Gardens	Local	
249X	Tsing Yi station	↔	Pok Hong	Express	
249X	Tsing Yi station	→	Tai Wai station	Express	AM Peak Hours only
251A	Kam Sheung Road station	↺	Sheung Tsuen	Local	
251B	Pat Heung Road	↺	Sheung Tsuen	Local	
251C	Kong Ha Wai	↺	Yuen Long	Local	
251C	Kong Ha Wai	→	Yuen Long (Hong Lok Road)	Local	AM Peak Hours only
251M	Sheung Tsuen	→	Tsuen Wan station	Express	AM Peak Hours only
252	Tuen Mun Road BBI	↺	So Kwun Wat	Local	
252	Avignon	→	Tuen Mun Road BBI	Local	AM Peak Hours only
252	Tuen Mun Road BBI	→	8 Kwun Chui Road	Local	Night service
252B	Hin Fat Estate	→	Tsim Sha Tsui	Express	AM Peak Hours only
252S	Hin Fat Estate	→	Kwun Tong Ferry	Express	AM Peak Hours only
252S	Kwun Tong Ferry	→	Chi Lok Fa Yuen (Castle Peak Road)	Express	PM Peak Hours only
252X	Hin Fat Estate	→	Lam Tin station	Express	AM Peak Hours only
252X	Lam Tin station	→	Chi Lok Fa Yuen (Castle Peak Road)	Express	PM Peak Hours only
252X	So Kwun Wat	→	Lam Tin station	Express	AM Peak Hours only
253	Tsing Fat Street Light Public Housing	↺	Tuen Mun Road BBI	Local	
254R	Yuen Long (YOHO Mall)	↺	Shek Kong Airfield	Local	Shek Kong Barracks Open Days only
258A	Hung Shui Kiu (Hung Fuk Estate)	→	Lam Tin station	Express	AM Peak Hours only
258D	Po Tin	↔	Lam Tin station	Express	
258P	Hung Shui Kiu (Hung Fuk Estate)	→	Lam Tin station	Express	AM Peak Hours only
258P	Lam Tin station	→	Hung Fuk Estate Hung Tin Road	Express	PM Peak Hours only
258S	Tai Hing	→	Lam Tin station	Express	AM Peak Hours only
258X	Po Tin	↔	Kwun Tong Ferry	Express	Peak Hours only
259B	Tuen Mun Ferry Pier	→	Tsim Sha Tsui (Middle Road)	Express	AM Peak Hours only
259C	Sun Tuen Mun Centre	→	Tsim Sha Tsui (Middle Road)	Express	AM Peak Hours only
259D	Lung Mun Oasis	↔	Lei Yue Mun Estate	Express	
259D	Yuet Wu Villa	→	Lei Yue Mun Estate	Express	AM Peak Hours only
259R	Hong Kong Coliseum	→	Tuen Mun Pier Head	Express	After large events at Hong Kong Coliseum only
259S	Lung Mun Oasis	↔	Kwun Tong Ferry	Express	Peak Hours only, via Tuen Mun Central
259X	Lung Mun Oasis	↔	Kwun Tong Ferry	Express	Peak Hours only
259X	Lam Wah Street Playground	→	Lung Mun Oasis	Express	PM Peak Hours only
260B	Tuen Mun Central	→	Tsim Sha Tsui	Express	AM Peak Hours only
260C	Sam Shing	↔	Kwai Fong station	Express	Peak Hours only
260R	Hong Kong Coliseum	→	Siu Hong Court	Express	After large events at Hong Kong Coliseum only
260X	Po Tin	↔	Hung Hom station	Express	
261	Sam Shing	↔	Cheung Wah	Express	
261B	Sam Shing	→	Kowloon station	Express	AM Peak Hours only
261B	So Kwun Wat	→	Kowloon station	Express	AM Peak Hours only
261P	Siu Hong Court	→	Tin Ping Estate	Express	AM Peak Hours only
261S	Yip Wong Estate	→	Tin Ping Estate	Express	AM Peak Hours only
261X	Tsing Fat Street Light Public Housing	↔	Cheung Wah	Express	Peak Hours only
263	Tuen Mun station	↔	Sha Tin station	Express	
263A	Tuen Mun station	↔	Hong Kong Science Park Phase III	Express	Peak Hours only
263B	Tuen Mun station	↔	Fo Tan (Shan Mei Street)	Express	Peak Hours only
263C	Tuen Mun station	↔	Education University of Hong Kong	Express	Peak Hours only
264X	Tin Yiu	↔	Tai Po Market station	Express	
265B	Tin Heng Estate	↔	Mong Kok (Park Avenue)	Express	
265M	Tin Heng Estate	↔	Lai Yiu	Express	
265P	Tin Yan Estate	↔	Tsuen Wan	Express	Peak Hours only
265S	Tin Shui Wai Town Centre	→	Education University of Hong Kong	Express	AM Peak Hours only
265S	Tai Po Industrial Estate	→	Tin Shui Wai Town Centre	Express	AM Peak Hours only
267X	Siu Hong Court	↔	Lam Tin station	Express	Peak Hours only
268	Yau Pok Road Light Public Housing (South)	↔	Pat Heung Road	Local	
268A	Long Ping Estate	↔	Kwun Tong Ferry Pier	Express	Peak Hours only
268B	Long Ping station	↔	Hung Hom (Hung Luen Road)	Express	Peak Hours only
268B	Hung Fuk Estate Hung Yuen Road	→	Hung Hom (Hung Luen Road)	Express	AM Peak Hours only
268C	Long Ping station	↔	Kwun Tong Ferry	Express	
268C	Silver Field Garden	→	Kwun Tong Ferry	Express	AM Peak Hours only
268M	Park YOHO	↔	Tsuen Wan West station	Express	
268P	Yuen Long (Shan Shui House)	→	Kwun Tong Ferry	Express	AM Peak Hours only
268P	Kwun Tong Ferry	→	Long Ping station	Express	PM Peak Hours only
268X	Hung Shui Kiu (Hung Fuk Estate)	↔	Jordan (West Kowloon station)	Express	
268X	Yuet Ping House Long Ping Estate	→	Jordan (West Kowloon station)	Express	AM Peak Hours only
269B	Tin Shui Wai Town Centre	↔	Hung Hom (Hung Luen Road)	Express	
269B	Tin Yan Estate	→	Hung Hom (Hung Luen Road)	Express	AM Peak Hours only
269C	Tin Shui Wai Town Centre	↔	Kwun Tong Ferry	Express	
269C	Tin Tsz	→	Kwun Tong Ferry	Express	AM Peak Hours only
269D	Tin Fu	↔	Lek Yuen	Express	
269D	Tin Shui Wai station	→	Lek Yuen	Express	AM Peak Hours only, via Hung Shui Kiu
269M	Tin Yan Estate	↔	Cho Yiu	Express	
269P	Tin Yan Estate	↔	Kwai Fong Estate	Express	Peak Hours only
269R	Hong Kong Coliseum	→	Tin Heng Estate	Express	After large events at Hong Kong Coliseum only
269S	Tin Shui Wai Town Centre	↔	Kwun Tong Ferry	Express	Peak hours only
269X	Tin Shui	↔	Jordan (West Kowloon station)	Express	Peak hours only
270	Tsui Lai Garden	↺	Tin Ping Estate	Local	
270	Tin Ping Estate	→	Tsui Lai Garden	Local	AM Peak Hours only
270A	Sheung Shui	↔	Tsim Sha Tsui East (Mody Road)	Express	
270B	Sheung Shui	↔	Olympic station	Express	
270B	Sheung Shui	→	Mong Kok (Hoi Wang Road)	Express	AM Peak Hours only
270B	Sham Shui Po (Pei Ho Street)	→	Sheung Shui	Express	PM Peak Hours only
270C	Luen Wo Hui	↔	Tsim Sha Tsui East (Mody Road)	Express	Peak Hours only
270D	Luen Wo Hui	↔	Sham Shui Po	Express	Peak Hours only
270E	Tsim Sha Tsui East (Mody Road)	→	Luen Wo Hui	Express	Evening only
270P	Sheung Shui	→	Kowloon station	Express	AM Peak Hours only
270R	Hong Kong Coliseum	→	Luen Wo Hui	Express	After large events at Hong Kong Coliseum only
270S	Tsim Sha Tsui East (Mody Road)	→	Luen Wo Hui	Express	Night service, via Sheung Shui
271	Fu Heng	↔	Jordan (West Kowloon station)	Express	
271	Tai Po Central	→	Jordan (West Kowloon station)	Express	AM Peak Hours only
271A	Fu Tip Estate	↔	Tsim Sha Tsui East (Mody Road)	Peak Hours only	
271B	Fu Heng	↔	Jordan (West Kowloon station)	Local	Peak Hours only, via Hong Kong Science Park
271P	Kau Lung Hang	→	Tsim Sha Tsui (Canton Road)	Express	AM Peak Hours only
271R	Hong Kong Coliseum	→	Tai Wo	Express	After large events at Hong Kong Coliseum only
271S	Hung Hom station	→	Tai Wo	Express	Night service
271X	Jordan (West Kowloon station)	→	Fu Heng	Express	PM Peak Hours only
272A	University station	↺	Pak Shek Kok	Local	
272A	Pak Shek Kok	→	University station	Local	Dawn only
272A	University station	→	Pok Yin Road	Local	Night service
272E	Tai Wo	↔	Mong Kok (Park Avenue)	Express	Peak Hours only
272K	University station	↺	Hong Kong Science Park	Local	Peak Hours only
272P	Fu Heng	↔	Kwai Hing station	Express	Peak Hours only
272P	Fu Tip Estate	↔	Kwai Hing station	Express	Peak Hours only
272S	Diamond Hill station	→	Hong Kong Science Park Phase III	Express	AM Peak Hours only
272S	Hong Kong Science Park	→	Diamond Hill station	Express	PM Peak Hours only
272X	Tai Po Central	↔	Mong Kok East station	Express	
273	Wah Ming	↺	Fanling station	Local	
273A	Choi Shek Estate	↺	Wah Ming	Local	
273A	Wah Ming	→	Choi Shek Estate	Local	Dawn only
273B	Ching Ho Estate	↺	Sheung Shui station	Local	
273C	Kau Lung Hang	→	Tsuen Wan West station	Express	AM Peak Hours only
273D	Sheung Shui	↺	Wah Ming	Local	
273P	Tai Wo	→	Tsuen Wan West station	Express	AM Peak Hours only
273S	Fanling (Fai Ming Road)	→	Fanling station	Local	AM Peak Hours only
273S	Fanling station	→	Wah Ming	Local	PM Peak Hours only
274	Tai Ping	→	Wu Kai Sha station	Express	AM Peak Hours only
274P	Wu Kai Sha station	↔	Tai Po Industrial Estate	Express	Peak Hours only
274X	Kwun Tong Ferry Pier	→	Tai Po Central	Express	PM Peak Hours only
275R	Tai Po Market station	↔	Wu Kau Tang	Local	Sundays and Public Holidays only
275X	Fu Shin Estate	↔	Hung Hom (Hung Luen Road)	Express	Peak Hours only
276	Tin Tsz	↔	Sheung Shui	Express	
276A	Tin Heng Estate	↔	Tai Ping	Express	
276A	Yan Fu House Tin Fu Court	→	Tai Ping	Express	AM Peak Hours only
276B	Tin Fu	↔	Choi Yuen	Express	via Lok Ma Chau
276C	Tin Shui Wai station	↔	Cheung Wah	Express	Peak Hours only, via Long Ping Estate
276P	Tin Shui Wai station	↔	Sheung Shui	Express	via Hung Shui Kiu
277A	Sha Tau Kok	↔	Lam Tin station	Express	Specific Service Hours only
277B	Kong Nga Po	↔	Lam Tin station	Express	Peak Hours only
277E	Tin Ping Estate	↔	Lam Tin station	Express	
277P	Tin Ping Estate	↔	Lam Tin station	Express	Peak Hours only, via Fanling, Wong Tai Sin, and San Po Kong
277X	Luen Wo Hui	↔	Lam Tin station	Express	
278A	Queen's Hill	↔	Tsuen Wan (Nina Tower)	Express	
278K	Luen Wo Hui	↺	Fanling station	Local	
278P	Tai Ping	→	Tsuen Wan (Nina Tower)	Express	AM Peak Hours only
278X	Sheung Shui	↔	Tsuen Wan (Nina Tower)	Express	
279A	Luen Wo Hui	→	Tsing Yi station	Express	AM Peak Hours only
279B	Luen Wo Hui	→	Kwai Hing station	Express	AM Peak Hours only
279S	Wo Hop Shek	↔	Cheung Ching	Local	Ching Ming Festival and Chung Yeung Festival only, via Tsuen Wan
279X	Luen Wo Hui	↔	Tsing Yi station	Express	
280X	Sui Wo Court	↔	Tsim Sha Tsui East (Mody Road)	Express	
280X	Royal Ascot	→	Tsim Sha Tsui East (Mody Road)	Express	AM Peak Hours only
281	Tai Wai station	↺	Sun Tin Wai	Local	
281A	Kwong Yuen	↔	Kowloon station	Express	
281A	Kowloon Central Post Office	→	Kwong Yuen	Express	PM Peak Hours only
281B	Shek Mun Estate	→	Tsim Sha Tsui East (Mody Road)	Local	AM Peak Hours only
281E	Haiphong Road Tsim Sha Tsui	→	Kwong Yuen	Express	PM Peak Hours only
281X	Yiu On	→	Tsim Sha Tsui East (Mody Road)	Express	AM Peak Hours only
282	Sha Tin Central	↺	Sun Tin Wai	Local	
283	Sha Tin Central	↺	Mei Chung Court	Local	
284	Sha Tin Central	↺	Ravana Garden	Local	
285	Fo Tan Chun Yeung Estate	↺	Sha Tin Central	Local	
285A	Fo Tan Chun Yeung Estate	↺	Fo Tan station	Local	AM Peak Hours only
285A	Fo Tan station	↺	Fo Tan Chun Yeung Estate	Local	PM Peak Hours only
285A	Fo Tan station	→	Fo Tan Chun Yeung Estate	Local	PM Peak Hours only
286A	Sha Tin Wai	↺	Cheung Sha Wan	Express	AM Peak Hours only
286C	Lee On	↔	Cheung Sha Wan (Hoi Tat Estate)	Express	
286D	Ma On Shan Town Centre	↔	Sham Shui Po	Express	Peak Hours only
286P	Mei Chung Court	→	Cheung Sha Wan	Express	AM Peak Hours only
286X	Hin Keng	↺	Sham Shui Po	Express	
287	University station	↔	Sai Sha Residences	Local	
287D	Hung Hom station	→	Kam Ying Court	Express	PM Peak Hours only
287P	Shui Chuen O	→	Yau Ma Tei	Express	AM Peak Hours only
287X	Shui Chuen O	↺	Jordan	Express	
288	Shui Chuen O (Upper)	↺	Sha Tin Central	Local	
288A	Shui Chuen O	→	Sha Tin Central	Local	AM Peak Hours only, not via Shui Chuen O Phase I
288B	Shui Chuen O	↔	Fo Tan Chun Yeung Estate	Local	Peak Hours only
288C	Shui Chuen O	→	Hin Keng	Local	AM Peak Hours only
288D	Ravana Garden	→	Shui Chuen O	Local	PM Peak Hours only
289K	University station	↺	Chevalier Garden	Local	
289R	Wong Shek Pier	↔	Sha Tin Central	Sundays and public holidays only	
290	Hang Hau (North) (Tseung Kwan O Hospital)	↔	Tsuen Wan West station	Express	
290A	Choi Ming	↔	Tsuen Wan West station	Express	via Sau Mau Ping, Shun Lee
290A	Sau Mau Ping (Upper)	→	Tsuen Wan West station	Express	AM Peak Hours only
290E	Tseung Kwan O Industrial Estate	↔	Tsuen Wan West station	Express	Peak Hours only
290X	LOHAS Park station	↔	Tsuen Wan West station	Express	
291P	Hong Kong University of Science and Technology (South)	→	Mong Kok	Express	PM Peak Hours only
292P	Sai Kung	→	Kwun Tong	Local	AM Peak Hours only
293S	Hang Hau (Ngan O Road)	↔	Mei Foo	Express	Night Service
296A	Sheung Tak	↺	Ngau Tau Kok station	Local	
296C	Sheung Tak	↔	Cheung Sha Wan (Hoi Ying Estate)	Express	
296D	Sheung Tak	↔	Kowloon station	Express	
296M	Hang Hau station	↔	Hong Sing Garden	Local	
296M	Tong Ming Court	→	Hong Sing Garden	Local	AM Peak Hours only
296P	Sheung Tak	↔	Lai Chi Kok station	Express	Peak Hours only
297	Po Lam	↔	Hung Hom (Hung Luen Road)	Express	
297P	Hang Hau (North) (Tseung Kwan O Hospital)	→	Hung Hom (Hung Luen Road)	Express	AM Peak Hours only, not via Kowloon Bay
298	Hang Hau station	↺	Pak Shing Kok	Local	Peak Hours only
298E	Hang Hau (North) (Tseung Kwan O Hospital)	↺	Tseung Kwan O Industrial Estate	Local	AM only
298F	Hang Hau (North) (Tseung Kwan O Hospital)	↺	Tseung Kwan O Industrial Estate	Local	PM only
298X	Hang Hau (North) (Tseung Kwan O Hospital)	↔	Mei Foo	Express	Specific Service Hours only
299X	Sha Tin Central	↔	Sai Kung	Express	
848	Sha Tin Racecourse	→	Kwai Fong station	Local	Racing days at occurring racecourse only
868	Sha Tin Racecourse	↔	Tuen Mun Central	Local	Racing days at occurring racecourse only
869	Sha Tin Racecourse	→	Tin Shui Wai Town Centre	Local	Racing days at occurring racecourse only
872	Sha Tin Racecourse	→	Tai Po Central	Local	Racing days at occurring racecourse only, via Tai Po Road
872X	Sha Tin Racecourse	→	Tai Po Central	Express	Racing days at occurring racecourse only, via Tolo Highway
887	Sha Tin Racecourse	→	Mong Kok (Park Avenue)	Local	Racing days at occurring racecourse only
888	Sha Tin Racecourse	→	Sha Tin station	Local	Racing days at occurring racecourse only
889	Sha Tin Racecourse	→	Ping Tin	Local	Racing days at occurring racecourse only
891	Sha Tin Racecourse	→	Kowloon City Ferry Pier	Local	Racing days at occurring racecourse only
893	Sha Tin Racecourse	→	Hong Sing Garden	Local	Racing days at occurring racecourse only
R78	Fanling station	↺	San Wai Barracks	Express	San Wai Barracks open days only
T74	Ng Tung Chai (Pak Ngau Shek)	↔	Kwun Tong Ferry Pier	Express	Peak Hours only
T80	Mei Tin	→	Kowloon Bay	Express	AM Peak Hours only
T80	Hin Keng	→	Kowloon Bay	Express	AM Peak Hours only
T270	Cheung Wah	↔	Tsim Sha Tsui East (Mody Road)	Express	Peak Hours only
T277	Sheung Shui	↔	Lam Tin station	Express	Peak Hours only
W3	Sheung Shui	↔	Jordan (West Kowloon station)	Express	
X42C	Cheung Hang	↔	Yau Tong	Express	
X42C	Hong Cheung House Cheung Hong Estate	→	Yau Tong	Express	AM Peak Hours only
X42P	Tsing Yi station	→	Lam Tin station	Express	AM Peak Hours only
X89D	Nai Chung	↔	Kwun Tong Ferry Pier	Express	Peak Hours only
X90	Fire and Ambulance Services Academy	→	Choi Hung (Hung Ngok House)	Express	Fire and Ambulance Services Academy open days only
N36	Tsuen Wan station	↺	Lei Muk Shue	Local	Night Service
N39	Tsuen Wan station	↺	Allway Gardens	Local	Night Service
N41X	Hung Hom station	→	Cheung Wang	Local	Night Service
N78	Sheung Shui	↔	Sha Tau Kok	Local	Night Service
N237	Mei Foo	↺	Kwai Shing	Local	Night Service
N241	Cheung Wang	↔	Hung Hom station	Local	Night Service
N252	Mei Foo	→	Sam Shing	Local	Night Service
N260	Mei Foo	↔	Tuen Mun Ferry Pier	Local	Night Service
N269	Mei Foo	↔	Tin Tsz	Local	Night Service
N271	Fu Heng	↔	Hung Hom station	Local	Night Service
N281	Kam Ying Court	↔	Hung Hom station	Local	Night Service
N283	Tsim Sha Tsui East (Mody Road)	→	Wong Nai Tau	Local	Night Service
N287	Tsim Sha Tsui East (Mody Road)	→	Wu Kai Sha station	Local	Night Service
N290	Tsuen Wan West station	↔	LOHAS Park station	Local	Night Service
N293	Sheung Tak	↔	Mong Kok (Park Avenue)	Local	Night Service

=== Citybus routes ===
Route	Terminals			Type of service	Notes
20	Kai Tak (Muk On Street)	↔	Cheung Sha Wan (Hoi Tat Estate)	Local	
20A	HSR West Kowloon station	↔	Kai Tak Cruise Terminal	Local	
20R	Hong Kong Coliseum	→	Kai Tak (Muk On Street)	Local	After large events at Hong Kong Coliseum only
20X	Kai Tak Cruise Terminal	↺	Tsim Sha Tsui	Local	
22	Kai Tak Cruise Terminal	↔	Festival Walk	Local	
22D	Kai Tak station	↺	Kai Tak Runway Area	Local	
22M	Kai Tak Cruise Terminal	↺	To Kwa Wan	Local	
22S	Kai Tak - AIRSIDE	↺	Kai Tak Cruise Terminal	Local	
22S	Kai Tak - AIRSIDE	↺	Kai Tak Hospital	Local	
22X	Kai Tak (One Victoria)	↺	Kai Tak station	Express	
50	Tuen Mun (Ching Tin Estate)	↔	Tsim Sha Tsui (Kowloon station)	Express	
50M	Tuen Mun (Ching Tin Estate)	↺	Tuen Mun station	Local	
50M	Wo Tin Estate	→	Tuen Mun station	Local	AM Peak Hours only
50R	Hong Kong Coliseum	→	Tuen Mun (Ching Tin Estate)	Express	After large events at Hong Kong Coliseum only
55	Tuen Mun (Ching Tin Estate)	↔	Kwun Tong Ferry Pier	Express	Specific Service Hours only
56	Tuen Mun (Ching Tin Estate)	↔	Sheung Shui (Tin Ping Estate)	Express	Non-Peak Hours, weekends and public holidays only
56A	Tuen Mun (Ching Tin Estate)	↔	Queen's Hill Fanling	Express	Peak Hours only
78C	Queen's Hill Fanling	↔	Kai Tak	Express	
78P	Queen's Hill Fanling	→	Kwun Tong (Lei Yue Mun Road)	Express	AM Peak Hours only
78X	Queen's Hill Fanling	→	Kai Tak	Express	AM Peak Hours only
79	Queen's Hill Fanling	↔	Tai Wai station	Local	via Tai Po
79P	Queen's Hill Fanling	↔	HSR West Kowloon station	Express	Peak Hours only
79X	Queen's Hill Fanling	↔	Cheung Sha Wan (Kom Tsun Street)	Express	
580	Sha Tin Central	↔	GO PARK Sai Sha	Local	
581	Ma On Shan Town Centre	↔	GO PARK Sai Sha	Local	
582	Pak Shek Kok	↺	GO PARK Sai Sha	Local	
586	Tsuen Wan station	↔	GO PARK Sai Sha	Express	Peak Hours only
587	Tsim Sha Tsui (Mody Road)	↔	GO PARK Sai Sha	Express	Peak Hours only
589	Kowloon Bay (Wai Yip Street)	↔	GO PARK Sai Sha	Express	Peak Hours only
701	Hoi Lai Estate	↺	Mong Kok	Express	
701A	Hoi Ying Estate	↺	Mong Kok	Express	
701S	Hoi Lai Estate	↺	Mong Kok	Express	Late Night Service
702	Hoi Lai Estate	↺	Festival Walk	Local	
702A	Hoi Ying Estate	↔	Pak Tin Estate	Local	AM Peak Hours only, Available on Schooldays
702B	Pak Tin Estate	↺	Hoi Ying Estate	Local	Specific Service Hours only
702S	So Uk	↺	Cheung Sha Wan (Sham Shing Road)	Local	Peak Hours only, Available on Schooldays
702S	Hoi Ying Estate	→	So Uk	Local	AM Peak Hours only, Available on Schooldays
790	Oscar by the Sea	↔	Tsim Sha Tsui (Mody Road)	Express	Specific Service Hours only
792M	Tseung Kwan O station	↔	Sai Kung	Local	
793	Tseung Kwan O Industrial Estate	↔	So Uk	Local	via Kowloon Bay Business Area
795	Tseung Kwan O Industrial Estate	↔	Cheung Sha Wan (Hoi Tat Estate)	Express	Peak Hours only
795X	Oscar by the Sea	↔	So Uk	Express	via Yau Ma Tei
796P	Tseung Kwan O station	↔	Tsim Sha Tsui (East)	Express	Specific Service Hours only
796S	Tseung Kwan O station	↺	Ngau Tau Kok station	Local	Overnight Service
796R	Hong Kong Coliseum	→	LOHAS Park	Express	After large events at Hong Kong Coliseum only
796X	LOHAS Park	↺	Hung Hom	Express	
797	LOHAS Park	↺	Kai Tak	Local	
797	LOHAS Park	→	Tseung Kwan O Industrial Estate	Local	AM Peak Hours only, via Kai Tak
797	LOHAS Park	→	San Po Kong	Local	AM Peak Hours only
798	Tiu Keng Leng station	↔	Fo Tan (Chun Yeung Estate)	Express	
798A	Tseung Kwan O (Hong Sing Garden)	→	Sha Tin station	Express	Peak Hours only
798A	Sha Tin Central	→	Tseung Kwan O (Hong Sing Garden)	Express	Peak Hours only
798P	Tseung Kwan O Industrial Estate	↔	Tai Wai Station	Express	AM Peak Hours only
798X	Tseung Kwan O Industrial Estate	↔	Fo Tan (Chun Yeung Estate)	Express	Peak Hours only
X797	Fire and Ambulance Services Academy	↺	Tiu Keng Leng station	Express	Fire and Ambulance Services Academy open days only
N20	Tai Kok Tsui (Island Harbourview)	→	Kai Tak (Muk On Street)	Local	Late Night Service
N50	Tuen Mun (Ching Tin Estate)	↔	Tsim Sha Tsui (Kowloon station)	Express	Late Night Service
N796	LOHAS Park	↺	Tsim Sha Tsui	Local	Overnight Service
N796	Tsim Sha Tsui	→	LOHAS Park	Local	Overnight Service, Special Departure

=== MTR East Rail line Feeder Bus routes ===
Route	Terminals			Type of service	Notes
K12	Eightland Gardens	↔	Tai Po Market station	Local	
K14	Tai Po Mega Mall	→	Tai Po Market station	Local	Morning Peak Hours Only
K17	Fu Shin Estate	↔	Tai Po Market station	Local	No service on Sundays and public holidays
K18	Kwong Fuk Estate	↔	Tai Po Market station	Local	No service on Sundays and public holidays

=== MTR Bus (Northwest New Territories) ===
These routes are not franchised routes, but the areas served by the LRT are a franchised area of the KCR Corporation / MTR Corporation Limited, and other bus companies were not allowed to run similar local routes in the northwestern New Territories until this restriction was lifted in 2006.

No.	Terminals			Route Map	Notes
506	Tuen Mun Ferry Pier	↔	Siu Lun		Former light rail route, hence the prefix 5 rather than K
K51	Fu Tai	↔	Tai Lam		
K51A	Fu Tai	↔	So Kwun Wat		
K52	Yuet Wu Villa	↔	Lung Kwu Tan		
K52A	Tuen Mun station	↔	Tsang Tsui		
K52P	Lung Kwu Tan	→	Tuen Mun station		Morning Peak hours only
K53	Tuen Mun station	↺	So Kwun Wat		Circular Route
K53S	Tuen Mun station	↺	Yip Wong Estate		Circular Route
K54	Wo Tin Estate	↺	Tuen Mun Town Centre		Circular Route
K54A	Wo Tin Estate	↔	Siu Hong station		
K58	Fu Tai	↔	So Kwun Wat		Morning Peak hours on schooldays only
K65	Yuen Long station	↔	Lau Fau Shan		
K65A	Tin Shui Wai station	↔	Lau Fau Shan		Peak hours only
K66	Tai Tong	↔	Long Ping		
K68	Yuen Long Industrial Estate	↺	Yuen Long Town Park		Circular Route
K73	Tin Heng	↔	Yuen Long West		
K74	Tin Shui Wai Town Centre	↺	Au Tau		Circular Route
K75A	Tin Shui Wai station	↺	Hung Shui Kiu		Circular Route
K75P	Tin Shui	↺	Hung Shui Kiu		Circular Route
K75S	Tin Shui Wai station	↺	Hung Shui Kiu (Hung Fuk Estate)		Circular Route, Peak hours only
K76	Tin Heng	↔	Tin Shui Wai station		
K76S	Wetland Park Road	↔	Tin Shui Wai station		Peak hours only

== Cross Harbour routes ==
All cross harbour routes have 3 digit route numbers, with the exception of route H1, H2, and H2K. Routes travelling through the Cross-Harbour Tunnel begin with a "1", (except for H1, H2, and H2K) and are shaded red. Routes travelling through the Eastern Harbour Tunnel begin with a "6", and are shaded red. Western Harbour Tunnel Routes begin with a "9", and are shaded green.

Most routes that begin with a "3" are morning express routes, with the exception of route 307.

=== Cross-Harbour Tunnel ===
Route	Terminals			Operator(s)	Notes
101	Kennedy Town	↔	Kwun Tong (Yue Man Square)	CTB, KMB	
101R	Happy Valley Racecourse	→	Kwun Tong (Yue Man Square)	CTB, KMB	Racing days at occurring racecourse only
101X	Kennedy Town	↔	Kwun Tong (Yue Man Square)	CTB, KMB	Express route, Peak Hours only
102	Shau Kei Wan	↔	Mei Foo	CTB, KMB	via Aldrich Bay
102P	Shau Kei Wan	↔	Mei Foo	CTB, KMB	Express route, Peak Hours only
102R	Happy Valley Racecourse	→	Mei Foo	CTB, KMB	Racing days at occurring racecourse only
103	Pokfield Road	↔	Chuk Yuen Estate	CTB, KMB	
104	Kennedy Town	↔	Pak Tin	CTB, KMB	
104R	Central Pier 5	→	Mong Kok	CTB, KMB	Only operates during Cheung Chau Bun Festival
105R	Wan Chai HKCEC	↔	Mei Foo	CTB, KMB	Only operates after Hong Kong Book Fair
106	Siu Sai Wan (Island Resort)	↔	Wong Tai Sin	CTB, KMB	
106A	Wong Tai Sin	→	Tai Koo (Kornhill Plaza)	CTB	Morning Peak Hours only
106P	Siu Sai Wan (Island Resort)	↔	Wong Tai Sin	CTB, KMB	Express route, Morning and Evening Peak Hours only
107	Wah Kwai	↔	Kowloon Bay	CTB, KMB	
107P	Laguna Verde	↔	Cyberport	CTB, KMB	Express Route, Morning and Evening Peak Hours only
108	Kai Yip	↔	Braemar Hill	KMB	
108	Kowloon City (Shing Tak Street)	→	Causeway Bay	KMB	Morning Peak Hours only
109	Central (Macau Ferry)	↔	Ho Man Tin	CTB, KMB	Via Queen's Road East
110	Shau Kei Wan	↺	Tsim Sha Tsui East (Mody Road)	CTB, KMB	Circular route
111	Central (Macau Ferry)	↔	Ping Shek	CTB, KMB	
111P	Choi Fook	↔	Central (Macau Ferry)	CTB, KMB	Peak Hours only
112	North Point	↔	So Uk	CTB, KMB	
113	Kennedy Town (Belcher Bay)	↔	Choi Hung	CTB, KMB	
115	Central (Macau Ferry)	↔	Kowloon City Ferry	CTB, KMB	
115P	Laguna Verde	→	Central (Macau Ferry)	CTB, KMB	Morning Peak Hours only
116	Quarry Bay	↔	Tsz Wan Shan (Central)	CTB, KMB	
117	Happy Valley (Lower)	↔	Sham Shui Po (Yen Chow Street)	CTB, KMB	
117R	Hong Kong Stadium	→	Mong Kok	CTB, KMB	After large events at Hong Kong Stadium only
118	Siu Sai Wan (Island Resort)	↔	Cheung Sha Wan (Sham Mong Road)	CTB, KMB	Express route via Eastern Corridor
118	Greenwood Terrace	→	Cheung Sha Wan (Sham Mong Road)	CTB, KMB	Morning Peak Hours only
118P	Siu Sai Wan (Island Resort)	↔	Cheung Sha Wan (Sham Mong Road)	CTB, KMB	Morning and Evening Peak Hours Via Heng Fa Chuen
170	Wah Fu (Central)	↔	Sha Tin station	CTB, KMB	Via Aberdeen, Victoria Park, Kowloon Tong, Tai Wai, Sha Tin Wai Some departures on Sunday and PH via Ocean Park
171	South Horizons	↔	Lai Chi Kok	CTB, KMB	
171A	Lei Tung Estate	→	Lai Chi Kok	CTB, KMB	Morning Peak Hours only
171P	South Horizons	→	Lai Chi Kok	CTB, KMB	Morning Peak Hours only omit Wong Chuk Hang
171R	Ocean Park	→	Mong Kok	CTB, KMB	On specific days only
182	Central (Macau Ferry)	↔	Sha Tin (Yu Chui Court)	CTB, KMB	
182X	Central (Macau Ferry)	→	Yu Chui Court	CTB, KMB	Express, Evening Peak Hours only via Shui Chuen O Not via Mong Kok & Kowloon Tong
373	Central (Hong Kong station)	→	Luen Wo Hui	KMB	Express Route, Evening Peak Hours only
H1	Central (Star Ferry)	↔	Tsim Sha Tsui (Hankow Road)	CTB	Mid-day to evening only
H2	Central (Star Ferry)	↔	Tsim Sha Tsui (Hankow Road)	CTB	Mid-day to evening only
H2K	Central Ferry Piers	↺	West Kowloon Cultural District	CTB	Evening to late night only
N118	Siu Sai Wan (Island Resort)	↔	Cheung Sha Wan (Sham Mong Road)	CTB, KMB	Night Service
N121	Central (Macau Ferry)	↔	Ngau Tau Kok	CTB, KMB	Night Service
N122	Shau Kei Wan	↔	Mei Foo	CTB, KMB	Night Service, via Aldrich Bay
N170	Wah Fu (Central)	↔	Sha Tin Central	CTB, KMB	Night Service
N171	Ap Lei Chau Estate	↔	Lai Chi Kok	CTB, KMB	Night Service
N182	Central (Macau Ferry)	↔	Sha Tin (Kwong Yuen)	CTB, KMB	Night Service
N368	Central (Macau Ferry)	↔	Yuen Long (West)	KMB	Night Service, Via Mei Foo
N373	Central (Macau Ferry)	↔	Luen Wo Hui	KMB	Night Service

=== Eastern Harbour Crossing ===
Route	Terminals			Operator(s)	Notes
302	Tsz Wan Shan (North)	→	Sheung Wan	CTB, KMB	Express Route, Morning Peak Hours Only, via Kowloon Bay
302A	Tsz Wan Shan (North)	→	North Point (Healthy Village)	CTB, KMB	Express Route, Morning Peak Hours Only
307	Central Ferry Piers	↔	Tai Po Central	CTB, KMB	Express
307	Tai Po Central	→	Sheung Wan	CTB, KMB	Morning Peak Hours Only
307A	Tai Po Tau	→	Sheung Wan	CTB, KMB	Express Route, Morning Peak Hours Only
307D	Tai Po (Ting Tai Road)	↔	Siu Sai Wan	CTB, KMB	Express Route, Peak Hours Only
307P	Tai Po (Ting Tai Road)	↔	Causeway Bay (Tin Hau)	CTB, KMB	Express Route, Peak Hours Only
307P	Fu Tip Estate	↔	Causeway Bay (Tin Hau)	CTB, KMB	Express Route, Peak Hours Only
373	Luen Wo Hui	→	Central (Hong Kong station)	KMB	Express Route, Morning Peak Hours Only
382	Nai Chung	→	Chai Wan (East)	CTB	Express Route, Morning Peak Hours Only
600	Anderson	↔	Central (Rumsey Street)	KMB	Specific Service Hours Only
600X	Anderson	↔	Central (Rumsey Street)	KMB	Express Route, Peak Hours Only
601	Admiralty station (East)	↔	Po Tat	CTB, KMB	
601P	Po Tat	↔	Sheung Wan	CTB, KMB	Express Route, Peak Hours Only
601P	Hiu Lai Court	→	Sheung Wan	CTB, KMB	Morning Peak Hours Only
603	Central Ferry Piers	↔	Ping Tin	KMB	Express Route, via Yau Tong
603	Ping Tin	→	Admiralty	KMB	Express Route, Morning Peak Hours Only
603A	Ping Tin	→	Central Market	KMB	Express Route, Morning Peak Hours Only
603A	Central (Rumsey Street)	→	Ping Tin	KMB	Express Route, Evening Peak Hours Only
603P	Central Ferry Piers	→	Ping Tin	KMB	Express Route, Evening Peak Hours Only, omit Causeway Bay
603S	Ping Tin	→	Central (Gilman Street)	KMB	Express Route, Morning Peak Hours Only
606	Choi Wan	↔	Siu Sai Wan (Island Resort)	CTB, KMB	via Yiu Tung Estate
606A	Choi Wan	↔	Yiu Tung Estate	CTB, KMB	Morning Peak Hours Only
606X	Kowloon Bay	↔	Siu Sai Wan (Island Resort)	CTB, KMB	Express Route, Peak Hours Only
606X	Kai Yip	→	Siu Sai Wan (Island Resort)	CTB, KMB	Express Route, Peak Hours Only
608	Kowloon City (Shing Tak Street)	↔	Shau Kei Wan	CTB	
608P	Siu Sai Wan (Island Resort)	↔	Kai Tak	CTB	Peak Hours Only
613	On Tai (West)	↔	Shau Kei Wan	KMB	
613A	On Tai (West)	↔	Heng Fa Chuen	KMB	Express Route, Peak Hours Only, via Siu Sai Wan
619	Shun Lee	↔	Central (Macau Ferry)	CTB, KMB	
619P	Shun Lee	→	Central (Macau Ferry)	CTB, KMB	Morning Peak Hours Only
619X	Shun Lee	↔	Central (Macau Ferry)	CTB, KMB	Express Route, Peak Hours Only
621	Laguna City	↔	Central (Hong Kong station)	CTB, KMB	Express Route, Peak Hours Only
641	Central (Macau Ferry)	↔	Kai Tak (Kai Ching Estate)	CTB, KMB	Express Route, Peak Hours Only
671	Ap Lei Chau (Lee Lok Street)	↔	Diamond Hill station	CTB, KMB	
671X	Ap Lei Chau (Lee Lok Street)	→	Diamond Hill station	CTB, KMB	Express Route, Morning Peak Hours Only
673	Sheung Shui	↔	Central (Hong Kong station)	KMB	Express Route
673A	Sheung Shui	→	Central (Rumsey Street)	KMB	Express Route, Morning Peak Hours Only
673A	Central (Hong Kong station)	→	Sheung Shui	KMB	Express Route, Evening Peak Hours Only
673P	Sheung Shui	→	Central (Rumsey Street)	KMB	Express Route, Morning Peak Hours Only
678	Sheung Shui	↔	Causeway Bay (Eastern Hospital Road)	CTB, KMB	Peak Hours Only
679	Queen's Hill Fanling	→	Central (Hong Kong station)	CTB	Morning Peak Hours Only
680	Ma On Shan (Lee On Estate)	↔	Admiralty station (East)	CTB, KMB	Express
680B	Ma On Shan (Chevalier Garden)	→	Admiralty station (East)	CTB, KMB	Morning Peak Hours Only
680P	Wu Kai Sha station	→	Admiralty station (East)	CTB, KMB	Morning Peak Hours Only
680X	Wu Kai Sha station	↔	Central (Macau Ferry)	CTB, KMB	Express Route, Peak Hours Only
681	Ma On Shan Town Centre	↔	Central (Hong Kong station)	CTB, KMB	Express
681P	Ma On Shan (Yiu On)	↔	Sheung Wan	CTB, KMB	Express Route, Peak Hours Only, via Kam Tai Court
682	Ma On Shan (Wu Kai Sha station)	↔	Chai Wan (East)	CTB	Express Route, via Siu Sai Wan
682	Ma On Shan (Lee On Estate)	→	Chai Wan (East)	CTB	Morning Peak Hours Only
682A	Ma On Shan Town Centre	→	Chai Wan (East)	CTB	Morning Peak Hours Only, via Kam Tai Court
682A	Chai Wan (East)	→	Nai Chung	CTB	Evening Peak Hours only, via Kam Tai Court
682B	Sha Tin (Shui Chuen O Estate)	↔	Chai Wan (East)	CTB	Peak Hours Only
682P	Ma On Shan (Wu Kai Sha station)	→	Chai Wan (East)	CTB	Express Route, Morning Peak Hours Only
690	Tseung Kwan O (Hong Sing Garden)	↔	Central (Exchange Square)	CTB, KMB	via Po Lam Estate and Tsui Lam Estate
690P	Tseung Kwan O (Hong Sing Garden)	→	Central (Exchange Square)	CTB, KMB	Express Route, Morning Peak Hours Only
690S	Hang Hau	↔	Central (Exchange Square)	CTB, KMB	Express Route, Peak Hours Only
694	Tiu Keng Leng station	↔	Siu Sai Wan Estate	CTB	Express Route
694S	Tiu Keng Leng station	↔	Siu Sai Wan Estate	CTB	Express Route, Peak Hours Only
N307	Central (Macau Ferry)	→	Tai Wo	CTB, KMB	Express Route, Night Service
N307	Tai Wo	→	Sheung Wan	CTB, KMB	Express Route, Night Service
N619	Shun Lee	↔	Central (Macau Ferry)	CTB, KMB	Night Service
N680	Ma On Shan (Kam Ying Court)	↔	Central (Macau Ferry)	CTB, KMB	Night Service
N691	Central (Macau Ferry)	↔	Tiu Keng Leng (King Ling Road)	CTB, KMB	Night Service

=== Western Harbour Crossing ===
Route	Terminals			Operator(s)	Notes & Remarks
382	Chai Wan (East)	→	Nai Chung	CTB	Express; Evening Peak Hours only
900	Pak Shek Kok	↔	Wan Chai (Convention Centre)	KMB	Express; Specific Service Hours only
900X	Pak Shek Kok	→	Wan Chai (Convention Centre)	KMB	Express; Morning Peak Hours only
904	Lai Chi Kok	↔	Kennedy Town (Belcher Bay)	CTB, KMB	
905	Lai Chi Kok	↔	Exhibition Centre station	CTB, KMB	via Sai Ying Pun
905A	Exhibition Centre station	→	Lai Chi Kok	CTB, KMB	Evening Peak Hours only
905P	Lai Chi Kok	→	Wan Chai (Harbour Road)	CTB, KMB	Morning Peak Hours only
907C	Fu Tip Estate	→	Wan Chai (Convention Centre)	CTB, KMB	Express; Morning Peak Hours only
907C	Admiralty station	→	Fu Tip Estate	CTB, KMB	Express; Evening Peak Hours only
914	Hoi Lai Estate	↔	Causeway Bay (Tin Hau)	CTB, KMB	via Tai Kok Tsui
914P	Hoi Lai Estate	→	Causeway Bay (Tin Hau)	KMB	Express; Morning Peak Hours only
914X	Hoi Lai Estate	→	Causeway Bay (Tin Hau)	CTB, KMB	Express; Morning Peak Hours only
930	Tsuen Wan West Station	↔	Exhibition Centre Station	CTB	via Tai Wo Hau Estate and Kwai Chung Estate
930	Exhibition Centre Station	→	Tsuen Wan (Discovery Park)	CTB	Morning Peak Hours only
930	Tsuen Wan West Station	→	Central (Macau Ferry)	CTB	Diversion for Marathon
930A	Tsuen Wan West Station	→	Exhibition Centre station	CTB	Morning Peak Hours only
930A	Wan Chai (Fleming Road)	→	Tsuen Wan (Discovery Park)	CTB	Express; Evening Peak Hours only via Shek Tong Tsui
930B	Kwai Shing (East)	→	Causeway Bay (Moreton Terrace)	CTB	Express; Morning Peak Hours only
930X	Tsuen Wan (Discovery Park)	↔	Causeway Bay (Moreton Terrace)	CTB	Express via Sha Tsui Road and Ma Tau Pa Road
933	Tsuen Wan West station	↔	Sai Wan Ho	CTB	Express; Peak Hours only
934	Bayview Garden	↔	Wan Chai (Fleming Road)	KMB	Express; Specific Service Hours only
934A	Allway Gardens	↔	Wan Chai (Fleming Road)	KMB	Express; Peak Hours only
935	Shek Lei	↔	Wan Chai (Fleming Road)	KMB	Express; Peak Hours only
935	On Yam	→	Wan Chai (Fleming Road)	KMB	Morning Peak Hours only
936	Shek Wai Kok	↔	Causeway Bay (Cotton Path)	KMB	Specific Service Hours only
936A	Shek Wai Kok	→	Causeway Bay (Cotton Path)	KMB	Express; Morning Peak Hours only
936A	Causeway Bay (Cotton Path)	→	Lei Muk Shue	KMB	Express; Evening Peak Hours only
948	Cheung On	↔	Causeway Bay (Tin Hau)	CTB, KMB	Specific Service Hours only
948A	Cheung On	→	Causeway Bay (Tin Hau)	CTB, KMB	Morning Peak Hours only
948B	Greenfield Garden	→	Causeway Bay (Tin Hau)	CTB, KMB	Morning Peak Hours only
948E	Tsing Yi station	↔	Tai Koo (Kornhill Plaza)	CTB, KMB	Express; Peak Hours only
948P	Cheung On	→	Causeway Bay (Tin Hau)	CTB, KMB	Express; Morning Peak Hours only
948X	Cheung Wang	→	Causeway Bay (Tin Hau)	CTB, KMB	Express; Morning Peak Hours only
950	Tuen Mun (Ching Tin Estate)	↔	Exhibition Centre station	CTB	Express; Peak Hours only
952	Tuen Mun (Chi Lok Fa Yuen)	↔	Causeway Bay (Moreton Terrace)	CTB	Express via Sham Tseng
952	Tuen Mun (Chi Lok Fa Yuen)	→	Admiralty (West)	CTB	Express; Morning Peak Hours only
952	Ka Loon Tsuen	→	Admiralty (West)	CTB	Express; Morning Peak Hours only
952C	So Kwun Wat	→	Tai Koo (Kornhill Plaza)	CTB	Morning Peak Hours only
952C	Quarry Bay	→	So Kwun Wat	CTB	Evening Peak Hours only
952P	Tuen Mun (Chi Lok Fa Yuen)	→	Causeway Bay (Moreton Terrace)	CTB	Express; Morning Peak Hours only
952P	Golden Beach	→	Causeway Bay (Moreton Terrace)	CTB	Express; Morning Peak Hours only
952P	So Kwun Wat	→	Causeway Bay (Moreton Terrace)	CTB	Express; Morning Peak Hours only
955	Tuen Mun (Ching Tin Estate)	↔	Sai Wan Ho	CTB	Express; Peak Hours only
960	Kin Sang	↔	Exhibition Centre station	KMB	Express
960A	Central	→	Fu Tai Estate	KMB	Evening Peak Hours only
960B	Kin Sang	↔	Quarry Bay (King's Road)	KMB	Express; Peak Hours only
960C	Fu Tai Estate	↔	Causeway Bay (Victoria Park)	KMB	Peak Hours only
960P	Hung Shui Kiu (Hung Yuen Road)	→	Causeway Bay (Victoria Park)	KMB	Express; Specific Service Hours only
960P	Causeway Bay (Victoria Park)	→	Hung Fuk Estate Hung Yuen Road	KMB	Evening Peak Hours only
960S	Fu Tai Estate	↔	Causeway Bay (Victoria Park)	KMB	Peak Hours only
960X	Hung Shui Kiu (Hung Yuen Road)	→	Quarry Bay (King's Road)	KMB	Express; Morning Peak Hours only
960X	Quarry Bay (King's Road)	→	Hung Fuk Estate Hung Yuen Road	KMB	Express; Evening Peak Hours only
961	Shan King	↔	Wan Chai (Convention Centre)	KMB	Express
961P	Leung King Estate	→	Causeway Bay (Victoria Park)	KMB	Express via Tuen Mun Central; Morning Peak Hours only
961S	Leung King Estate	→	Causeway Bay (Victoria Park)	KMB	Express; Morning Peak Hours only
962	Tuen Mun (Lung Mun Oasis)	↔	Causeway Bay (Moreton Terrace)	CTB	Express via Hong Kong Gold Coast; Peak Hours only
962A	Tuen Mun (Yuet Wu Villa)	→	Admiralty (Cotton Tree Drive)	CTB	Express; Morning Peak Hours only
962C	Tuen Mun (Lung Mun Oasis)	→	Tai Koo (Kornhill Plaza)	CTB	Morning Peak Hours only
962C	Sam Shing	→	Tai Koo (Kornhill Plaza)	CTB	Morning Peak Hours only
962C	Quarry Bay	→	Tuen Mun (Lung Mun Oasis)	CTB	Evening Peak Hours only
962G	Causeway Bay (Moreton Terrace)	→	Tuen Mun (Yuet Wu Villa)	CTB	Express; Evening Peak Hours only
962P	Tuen Mun (Lung Mun Oasis)	→	Causeway Bay (Moreton Terrace)	CTB	Express; Morning Peak Hours only
962P	Yip Wong Estate	→	Causeway Bay (Moreton Terrace)	CTB	Express; Morning Peak Hours only
962X	Tuen Mun (Lung Mun Oasis)	↔	Causeway Bay (Moreton Terrace)	CTB	Express
967	Tin Shui Wai (Tin Yan Estate)	↔	Admiralty (West)	CTB	Express via Hong Kong Wetland Park
967X	Tin Shui Wai (Tin Yan Estate)	↔	Causeway Bay	CTB	Express; Specific Service Hours only
968	Yuen Long (West)	↔	Causeway Bay (Tin Hau)	KMB	Express
968	Yuen Long Park	→	Causeway Bay (Tin Hau)	KMB	Express; Morning Peak Hours only
968	Fleming Road	→	Yuen Long (West)	KMB	Express; Evening Peak Hours only
968A	Yuen Long (West)	→	Causeway Bay (Tin Hau)	KMB	Express via Long Ping Estate; Morning Peak Hours only
968X	Yuen Long (Tak Yip Street)	↔	Quarry Bay (King's Road)	KMB	Express; Peak Hours only
969	Tin Shui Wai Town Centre	↔	Causeway Bay (Moreton Terrace)	CTB	Express
969B	Tin Shui Wai Town Centre	↔	Wan Chai	CTB	Peak Hours only
969B	Kingswood Villas (Locwood Court)	→	Wan Chai	CTB	Morning Peak hours only
969B	Tin Shui Wai station	→	Wan Chai	CTB	Morning Peak hours only
969C	Kingswood Villas (Maywood Court)	→	Tai Koo (Kornhill Plaza)	CTB	Morning Peak Hours only
969C	Tin Shui Wai Town Centre	→	Tai Koo (Kornhill Plaza)	CTB	Morning Peak Hours only via Tin Shui Wai North
969C	Quarry Bay	→	Tin Shui Wai (Tin Shui)	CTB	Evening Peak Hours only
969N	Tin Shui Wai Town Centre	→	Causeway Bay (Moreton Terrace)	CTB	Night Service
969P	Tin Shui Wai Town Centre	→	Causeway Bay (Moreton Terrace)	CTB	Morning Peak Hours only
969X	Tin Shui Wai Town Centre	→	Causeway Bay	CTB	Express via Tin Shui Wai South; Morning Peak Hours only
970	So Uk	↔	Cyberport	CTB	Express via Wah Fu Estate and Sai Ying Pun
970X	Cheung Sha Wan (Kom Tsun Street)	↔	Aberdeen	CTB	Express via Chi Fu Fa Yuen
970X	Tin Wan	→	Cheung Sha Wan (Kom Tsun Street)	CTB	Special Service; Peak Hours only
971	Hoi Lai Estate	↔	Aberdeen (Shek Pai Wan)	CTB	via Victoria Road
973	Tsim Sha Tsui (Mody Road)	↔	Stanley Market	CTB	via Aberdeen
978	Wah Ming	↔	Exhibition Centre station	KMB	Express
978A	Luen Wo Hui	↔	Exhibition Centre station	KMB	Express; Peak Hours only
978B	Chi Fuk Circuit Fanling	→	Exhibition Centre station	KMB	Express; Morning Peak Hours only
979	Queen's Hill Fanling	→	Central (Hong Kong station)	CTB	Express; Morning Peak Hours only
979	North Point Ferry Pier	→	Queen's Hill Fanling	CTB	Express; Evening Peak Hours only
980A	Shek Mun Estate	→	Wan Chai (Fleming Road)	CTB, KMB	Morning Peak Hours only
980X	Wu Kai Sha station	→	Wan Chai (Fleming Road)	CTB, KMB	Morning Peak Hours only
980X	Sai Sha Residences	→	Wan Chai (Fleming Road)	CTB, KMB	Morning Peak Hours only
980X	Admiralty (East)	→	Wu Kai Sha station	CTB, KMB	Evening Peak Hours only
980X	Admiralty (East)	→	Sai Sha Residences	CTB, KMB	Evening Peak Hours only
981P	Yiu On	→	Wan Chai (Fleming Road)	CTB, KMB	Morning Peak Hours only
981P	Admiralty (East)	→	Yiu On	CTB, KMB	Evening Peak Hours only
982C	Shek Mun Estate	→	Sai Wan Ho	CTB	Express; Morning Peak Hours only
982X	Yu Chui Court	→	Wan Chai (Fleming Road)	CTB, KMB	Express; Peak Hours only
982X	Shui Chuen O	→	Wan Chai (Fleming Road)	CTB, KMB	Express; Peak Hours only
982X	Admiralty (East)	→	Yu Chui Court	CTB, KMB	Express; Peak Hours only
985	Mei Tin (Mei Chi House)	→	Wan Chai	CTB, KMB	Express; Peak Hours only
985	Admiralty (East)	→	Mei Tin	CTB, KMB	Express; Peak Hours only
985A	Mei Tin (Mei Chi House)	→	Wan Chai	CTB, KMB	Express; Morning Peak Hours only
985B	Tin Sam Village	→	Wan Chai	CTB, KMB	Express; Morning Peak Hours only
986	Sha Tin Wai	→	Sai Wan Ho	CTB	Express; Morning Peak Hours only
987	Sai Wan Ho	→	Fo Tan (Chun Yeung Estate)	CTB	Express; Evening Peak Hours only
989	Fo Tan (Chun Yeung Estate)	→	Sai Wan Ho	CTB	Express; Morning Peak Hours only
N930	Tsuen Wan (Discovery Park)	↔	Causeway Bay (Moreton Terrace)	CTB	Night Service
N952	Tuen Mun (Chi Lok Fa Yuen)	↔	Causeway Bay (Moreton Terrace)	CTB	Night Service via Sham Tseng
N960	Kin Sang	↔	Exhibition Centre station	KMB	Night Service
N962	Tuen Mun (Lung Mun Oasis)	↔	Causeway Bay (Moreton Terrace)	CTB	Night Service
N969	Tin Shui Wai Town Centre	↔	Causeway Bay (Moreton Terrace)	CTB	Night Service via Tuen Mun
P960	Siu Hong station (North)	↔	Exhibition Centre station	KMB	Express; First Class Service via Causeway Bay; Peak Hours only
P968	Yuen Long (West)	↔	Causeway Bay (Tin Hau)	KMB	Express; First Class Service; Peak Hours only
P968	Long Ping station	→	Causeway Bay (Tin Hau)	KMB	Express; First Class Service; Morning Peak Hours only
X962	Admiralty (West)	→	Tuen Mun (Lung Mun Oasis)	CTB	Express; Evening Peak Hours only
X970	South Horizons	→	Cheung Sha Wan (Kom Tsun Street)	CTB	Express; Morning Peak Hours only

== North Lantau routes ==
These routes serve Northern Lantau Island, namely Tung Chung, Disneyland, Airport, AsiaWorld–Expo and Hong Kong–Zhuhai–Macau Bridge. Most of them link Lantau with Kowloon and Hong Kong Island. Routes are divided into Airport Bus Routes (with a prefix "A"), Late Night Airport Bus Routes (with a prefix "NA"), North Lantau External Routes (with a prefix "E"), North Lantau External Night Bus Routes (with a prefix "N"), Disneyland Routes (with a prefix "R"), Shuttle Routes (with a prefix "S") and AsiaWorld–Expo Special Routes (with a prefix "X").

All North Lantau routes are either served by Citybus (CTB) or Long Win Bus (LWB).

=== Airport Buses ===
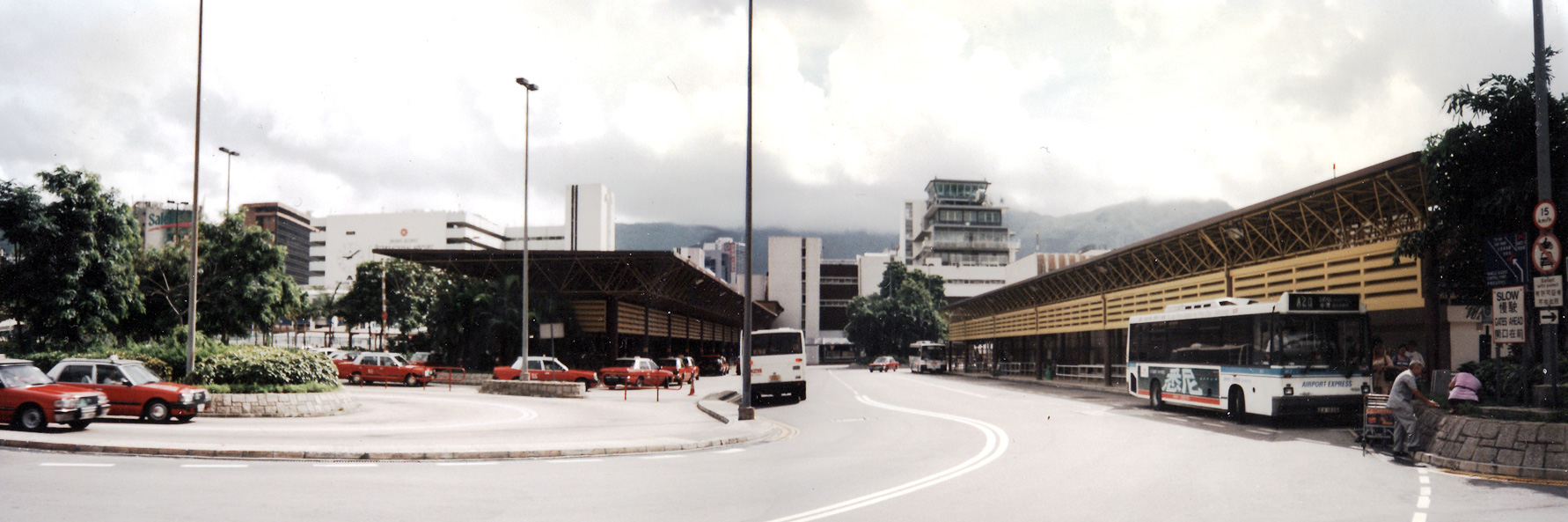
The old A20 bus at the old airport

Route	Terminals			Operator	Notes & Remarks
A10	Ap Lei Chau (Lee Lok Street)	↔	Airport	CTB	via Hong Kong–Zhuhai–Macao Bridge Hong Kong Port
A11	North Point Ferry Pier	↔	Airport	CTB	via Hong Kong–Zhuhai–Macao Bridge Hong Kong Port
A11R	Central (Star Ferry)	→	Airport	CTB	via Hong Kong–Zhuhai–Macao Bridge Hong Kong Port
A12	Siu Sai Wan (Island Resort)	↔	Airport	CTB	via Hong Kong–Zhuhai–Macao Bridge Hong Kong Port
A17	Sham Wan	↔	Airport	CTB	via Hong Kong–Zhuhai–Macao Bridge Hong Kong Port, Queens Road E, Happy Valley & Wong Nai Chung Gap
A20	Ho Man Tin	↔	Airport	CTB	via Hong Kong–Zhuhai–Macao Bridge Hong Kong Port
A21	Hung Hom station	↔	Airport	CTB	via Hong Kong–Zhuhai–Macao Bridge Hong Kong Port
A22	Lam Tin station	↔	Airport	CTB	via Hong Kong–Zhuhai–Macao Bridge Hong Kong Port
A23	Tsz Wan Shan (North)	↔	Airport	CTB	via Hong Kong–Zhuhai–Macao Bridge Hong Kong Port
A25	Kai Tak	↔	Airport	CTB	via Hong Kong–Zhuhai–Macao Bridge Hong Kong Port
A26	Yau Tong	↔	Airport	CTB	via Hong Kong–Zhuhai–Macao Bridge Hong Kong Port
A28	Lohas Park	↔	Airport	CTB	via Hong Kong–Zhuhai–Macao Bridge Hong Kong Port
A28X	Tseung Kwan O station	→	Airport	CTB	Morning Peak hours only via Hong Kong–Zhuhai–Macao Bridge Hong Kong Port & Lohas Park
A29	Tseung Kwan O (Po Lam)	↔	Airport	CTB	via Hong Kong–Zhuhai–Macao Bridge Hong Kong Port
A30	Lei Muk Shue	↔	Airport	LWB	via Hong Kong–Zhuhai–Macao Bridge Hong Kong Port
A31	Tsuen Wan (Nina Tower)	↔	Airport	LWB	via Hong Kong–Zhuhai–Macao Bridge Hong Kong Port
A32	Kwai Chung Estate	↔	Airport	LWB	via Hong Kong–Zhuhai–Macao Bridge Hong Kong Port
A33	Tuen Mun Road Interchange	↔	Airport	LWB	via Hong Kong–Zhuhai–Macao Bridge Hong Kong Port
A33X	Tuen Mun (Fu Tai)	↔	Airport	LWB	Express via Hong Kong–Zhuhai–Macao Bridge Hong Kong Port
A33X	Cathay Pacific City	→	Tuen Mun (Fu Tai)	LWB	Evening Peak Hours only
A34	Hung Shui Kiu (Hung Yuen Road)	↔	Airport	LWB	via Hong Kong–Zhuhai–Macao Bridge Hong Kong Port
A35	Mui Wo	↔	HZMB Hong Kong Port	NLB	Peak Hours and Late Night only
A36	Kam Sheung Road station	↔	Airport	LWB	via Hong Kong–Zhuhai–Macao Bridge Hong Kong Port
A37	Long Ping station	↔	Airport	LWB	via Tin Shui Wai and Hong Kong–Zhuhai–Macao Bridge Hong Kong Port
A38	Tsuen Wan (Allway Gardens)	↔	Airport	LWB	via Sham Tseng and Hong Kong–Zhuhai–Macao Bridge Hong Kong Port
A41	Sha Tin (Shek Mun Estate)	↔	Airport	LWB	via Hong Kong–Zhuhai–Macao Bridge Hong Kong Port
A41P	Wu Kai Sha station	↔	Airport	LWB	via Hong Kong–Zhuhai–Macao Bridge Hong Kong Port
A41P	Sai Sha Residences	↔	Airport	LWB	Peak Hours only
A42	Sha Tin (Wong Nai Tau)	↔	Airport	LWB	via Hong Kong–Zhuhai–Macao Bridge Hong Kong Port
A43	Fanling (Luen Wo Hui)	↔	Airport	LWB	via Hong Kong–Zhuhai–Macao Bridge Hong Kong Port
A43P	Fanling (Luen Wo Hui)	↔	Airport	LWB	via Lok Ma Chau and Hong Kong–Zhuhai–Macao Bridge Hong Kong Port
A43P	Queen's Hill	↔	Airport	LWB	Peak Hours only
A46	Fo Tan (Royal Ascot)	↔	Airport	LWB	via Hong Kong–Zhuhai–Macao Bridge Hong Kong Port
A47X	Tai Po (Tai Wo)	↔	Airport	LWB	via Hong Kong–Zhuhai–Macao Bridge Hong Kong Port
NA10	Ap Lei Chau (Lee Lok Street)	↔	HZMB Hong Kong Port	CTB	Late Night Service
NA11	North Point Ferry Pier	↔	HZMB Hong Kong Port	CTB	Late Night service
NA12	Heng Fa Chuen	↔	HZMB Hong Kong Port	CTB	Late Night Service
NA20	HZMB Hong Kong Port	↔	Whampoa Garden	CTB	Late Night service
NA21	HZMB Hong Kong Port	↺	Mong Kok	CTB	Late Night service
NA29	Tseung Kwan O (Po Lam)	↔	HZMB Hong Kong Port	CTB	Late Night service
NA30	Lei Muk Shue	↔	HZMB Hong Kong Port	LWB	Late Night service
NA31	Tsuen Wan (Nina Tower)	↔	HZMB Hong Kong Port	LWB	Late Night service
NA32	Kwai Chung Estate	↔	HZMB Hong Kong Port	LWB	Late Night service
NA33	Tuen Mun (Fu Tai)	↔	Cathay Pacific City	LWB	Late Night Service via Hong Kong–Zhuhai–Macao Bridge Hong Kong Port
NA36	Kam Sheung Road station	↔	Cathay Pacific City	LWB	Late Night Service via Hong Kong–Zhuhai–Macao Bridge Hong Kong Port
NA37	Tin Shui Wai Town Centre	↔	Cathay Pacific City	LWB	Late Night Service via Hong Kong–Zhuhai–Macao Bridge Hong Kong Port
NA40	Wu Kai Sha station	↔	HZMB Hong Kong Port	LWB	Late Night Service
NA41	Sha Tin (Shui Chuen O)	↔	HZMB Hong Kong Port	LWB	Late Night Service
NA43	Fanling (Luen Wo Hui)	↔	HZMB Hong Kong Port	LWB	Late Night Service
NA47	Tai Po (Tai Wo)	↔	HZMB Hong Kong Port	LWB	Late Night Service
NA52	Tuen Mun Road Interchange	↔	Cathay Pacific City	LWB	Late Night Service via Hong Kong–Zhuhai–Macao Bridge Hong Kong Port

=== External Routes (including Night Buses) ===
Route	Terminals			Operator(s)	Notes & Remarks
E11	Tin Hau station	↔	SkyCity	CTB	
E11A	Tin Hau station	↔	SkyCity	CTB	Specific service hours only, via Tung Chung North
E11B	Tung Chung (Mun Tung Estate)	↔	Tin Hau station	CTB	Specific service hours only, via Tung Chung North
E11S	Tung Chung (Mun Tung Estate)	→	Tin Hau station	CTB	Morning Peak hours only
N11	Central (Macau Ferry)	↔	Airport	CTB	Overnight Night Service
E18	Tung Chung (Cheung Tung Estate)	→	North Point Ferry Pier	CTB	Morning Peak hours only
E21	Tai Kok Tsui (Island Harbourview)	↔	SkyCity	CTB	
E21A	Ho Man Tin (Oi Man Estate)	↔	Tung Chung (Yat Tung Estate)	CTB	via Tung Chung North
E21B	Ho Man Tin (Oi Man Estate)	↔	Tung Chung (Yat Tung Estate)	CTB	Omit Tung Chung North
E21C	Tai Kok Tsui (Island Harbourview)	↔	Aircraft Maintenance Area	CTB	Peak hours only
E21D	Tai Kok Tsui (Island Harbourview)	↔	SkyCity	CTB	via Tung Chung North
E21X	Tung Chung (Mun Tung Estate)	→	Hung Hom station	CTB	Morning Peak hours only
N21	Tsim Sha Tsui (Star Ferry)	↔	Airport	CTB	Overnight Night Service
N21A	Tsim Sha Tsui (Star Ferry)	↔	Airport	CTB	Night Service, via Tung Chung North and Yat Tung Estate
E22	Lam Tin (North)	↔	SkyCity	CTB	
E22A	Tseung Kwan O (Hong Sing Garden)	↔	SkyCity	CTB	
E22C	Tiu Keng Leng station	↔	Aircraft Maintenance Area	CTB	Peak hours only
E22P	Yau Tong	↔	SkyCity	CTB	Peak hours only, via Sau Mau Ping, Cathay City and Dragonair-CNAC Towers
E22S	Tung Chung (Mun Tung Estate)	↔	Tseung Kwan O (Po Lam)	CTB	Peak hours only
E22X	Yau Tong	↔	SkyCity	CTB	Peak hours only, via Kwun Tong Road, Cathay City and Dragonair-CNAC Towers
E23	Tsz Wan Shan (South)	↔	Airport	CTB	via Hung Hom
E23A	Tsz Wan Shan (South)	↔	Airport	CTB	via Tung Chung North
N23	Tsz Wan Shan (North)	↔	Tung Chung station/Airport	CTB	Night Service
N26	Yau Tong	↔	Tung Chung station/Airport	CTB	Night Service, via Sau Mau Ping
E28	Tung Chung (Cheung Tung Estate)	→	Tseung Kwan O Industrial Estate	CTB	Morning Peak hours only
N29	Tseung Kwan O (Hong Sing Garden)	↔	Tung Chung station/Airport	CTB	Night Service
N30	Yuen Long station	↔	Airport (Cheong Tat Road)	LWB	Night Service, via Tuen Mun
E31	Tsuen Wan (Discovery Park)	↔	Tung Chung (Yat Tung Estate)	LWB	
N31	Tsuen Wan (Discovery Park)	↔	Airport	LWB	Night Service, via Tung Chung, Airfreight Terminal & Chek Lap Kok South
E32	Kwai Fong (South)	↔	SkyCity	LWB	
E32A	Kwai Fong (South)	↔	Tung Chung Development Pier	LWB	via Tung Chung North
E33	Tuen Mun Central	↔	Airport	LWB	
E33P	Siu Hong Station (South)	↔	Airport	LWB	Specific service hours only
E33P	Blossom Garden	→	Airport	LWB	Morning Peak hours only
N35	Mui Wo	↔	HZMB Hong Kong Port	NLB	Night Service, Via Airport
E36	Yuen Long (Pat Heung Road)	↔	Airport	LWB	
E36A	Yuen Long (Tak Yip Street)	↔	Tung Chung (Yat Tung Estate)	LWB	via Tung Chung North
E36C	Yuen Long (Tak Yip Street)	↔	Aircraft Maintenance Area	LWB	Peak hours only
E36P	Sheung Tsuen	↔	SkyCity	LWB	Peak hours only
E36S	Yuen Long (Ma Wang Road)	↔	Airport	LWB	Peak hours only
E37	Tin Shui Wai Town Centre	↔	Airport	LWB	
E37	Chung Ki House Tin Chung Court	→	Airport	LWB	Weekdays morning peak hours only
E37C	Tin Shui Wai Town Centre	↔	Aircraft Maintenance Area	LWB	Peak hours only
E41	Tai Po Tau	↔	SkyCity	LWB	
E42	Sha Tin (Pok Hong)	↔	Airport	LWB	
E42C	Sha Tin (Pok Hong)	↔	Aircraft Maintenance Area	LWB	Peak hours only
E42P	Tung Chung (Yat Tung Estate)	↔	Fo Tan (Shan Mei Street)	LWB	Peak hours only
N42	Ma On Shan (Yiu On)	↔	Tung Chung station/Airport	LWB	Night Service
N42A	Fanling (Luen Wo Hui)	↔	Tung Chung station	LWB	Night Service
E43	Fanling (Wah Ming)	↔	Tung Chung Development Pier	LWB	Peak hours only, via Tung Chung North

=== Disneyland routes ===
Route	Terminals			Date Introduced	Operator(s)	Notes
R8	Disneyland	↺	Lantau Link Interchange	16 August 2005	CTB, LWB	
R11	Disneyland	→	North Point Ferry Pier	August 16, 2005	CTB	After marathons and events held at any park concert venues only
R33	Tuen Mun Station	↔	Disneyland	16 August 2005	LWB	Morning and evening only
R33P	Disneyland	→	Siu Hong Station (South)	May 4, 2018	LWB	After large events at Fantasyland only
R34	Disneyland	→	Hung Shui Kiu	May 4, 2018	LWB	After events at Fantasyland only
R42	Tai Wai Station	↔	Disneyland	16 August 2005	LWB	Morning and evening only

=== Chek Lap Kok Shuttle routes ===
Route	Terminals			Date Introduced	Operator(s)	Notes
S1	Tung Chung station	↺	Airport	20 June 1999	CTB, LWB	Circular Route
S52	Tung Chung (Yat Tung Estate)	↔	Aircraft Maintenance Area	22 June 1998	CTB	
S52A	Tung Chung (Yu Nga Court)	↔	Aircraft Maintenance Area	23 July 2018	CTB	Peak Hours only
S52P	Tung Chung (Yat Tung Estate)	↺	Chun Ping Road (Asia Airfreight Terminal)	20 June 1999	CTB	Circular Route, Morning Peak Hours only
S56	Tung Chung station	↺	Airport	7 December 2002	CTB	Circular Route
S64	Tung Chung (Yat Tung Estate)	↺	Airport	22 June 1998	LWB	Circular Route
S64C	Tung Chung (Yat Tung Estate)	↺	Catering Road East	22 November 2014	LWB	Circular Route, Morning Peak Hours only
S64P	Tung Chung (Cheung Tung Estate)	↺	Catering Road East	7 December 2002	LWB	Circular Route, Peak Hours only
S64X	Tung Chung (Mun Tung Estate)	↺	Airport	22 November 2014	LWB	Circular Route, Specific Service Hours only
N64	Airport	→	Tung Chung (Yat Tung Estate)	12 October 2009	LWB	Night Service

=== AsiaWorld–Expo special services ===
These routes only depart for the AsiaWorld–Expo before large-scale events start, or return to the urban areas after large-scale events have ended.

Route	Terminus	Operator(s)	Notes & Remarks
X1	Tung Chung station ↔ AsiaWorld–Expo	CTB, LWB	only on days with events at AsiaWorld-Expo
X33	AsiaWorld–Expo → Hung Fuk Estate Hung Yuen Road	LWB	only after large events at AsiaWorld-Expo
X36	AsiaWorld–Expo → Kam Sheung Road station	LWB	only after large events at AsiaWorld-Expo
X40	AsiaWorld–Expo → Wu Kai Sha station	LWB	only after large events at AsiaWorld-Expo
X43	AsiaWorld–Expo → Fanling (Luen Wo Hui)	LWB	only after large events at AsiaWorld-Expo
X47	AsiaWorld–Expo → Tai Po (Fu Heng Estate)	LWB	only after large events at AsiaWorld-Expo

== Lantau Island routes ==
Bus routes that link different parts of Lantau are operated by the New Lantao Bus Company.

Note that the service types "North-South Lantau" or "South Lantau" have different fare between weekdays and holidays, and routes labelled chartered service are only available to pre-booked packaged tours.

Route	Terminals			Type of service	Notes
1	Mui Wo	↔	Tai O	South Lantau	
1R	Hung Hom (Hung Luen Road)	→	Ngong Ping	North-South Lantau	Sundays and public holidays service only
1S	Mui Wo	↔	Tai O	South Lantau	Chartered service
2	Mui Wo	↔	Ngong Ping	South Lantau Ngong Ping	
2S	Mui Wo	↔	Ngong Ping	South Lantau Ngong Ping	Chartered service
3M	Mui Wo	↔	Tung Chung Town Centre	North-South Lantau	
3R	Tung Chung Town Centre	↺	Pui O	North-South Lantau	Circular route, Saturdays, Sundays and public holidays service only
4	Mui Wo	↔	Tong Fuk	South Lantau	
7S	Mui Wo	↔	Lai Chi Yuen Cemetery	South Lantau	Ching Ming Festival and Double Ninth Festival only
11	Tung Chung Town Centre	↔	Tai O	North-South Lantau	
11	Tai O - (Sha Tsui)	→	Tung Chung Station		Special Departures
11A	Tung Chung Town Centre	↔	Shek Pik	North-South Lantau	Saturdays, Sundays and public holidays service only
11R	Tung Chung Town Centre	↔	Tong Fuk	North-South Lantau	Saturdays, Sundays and public holidays service only, debated whether this route actually runs as of 16/12/2024
11S	Tung Chung Town Centre	↔	Tai O	North-South Lantau	Chartered service
13S	Tung Chung Town Centre	↔	Mui Wo	North-South Lantau	Chartered service
21	Tai O	↔	Ngong Ping	South Lantau Ngong Ping	
21S	Tai O	↔	Ngong Ping	South Lantau Ngong Ping	Chartered service
23	Tung Chung Tat Tung Road	↔	Ngong Ping	North-South Lantau Ngong Ping	
23S	Tung Chung Town Centre	↔	Ngong Ping	North-South Lantau Ngong Ping	Chartered service
34	Tung Chung Tat Tung Road	↔	Shek Mun Kap	North Lantau	
36	Tung Chung Tat Tung Road	↔	Disneyland	North Lantau	
36M	Tung Chung Cheung Tung Estate	→	Sunny Bay station	North Lantau	Weekday morning peak hour service only
36X	Mun Tung Estate	→	Disneyland	North Lantau	Weekday morning peak hour service only
37	Ying Tung Estate	↔	Yat Tung Estate	North Lantau	School days only, via Mun Tung Estate and Chung Yat Street
37A	Cheung Tung Estate	↺	Tung Chung station	North Lantau	Circular route, weekday morning peak hour service only
37H	Ying Tung Estate	↺	Mun Tung Estate	North Lantau	Circular route, via Tung Chung Town Centre and Yat Tung
37M	Ying Tung Estate	↺	Tung Chung station	North Lantau	Circular route
37P	Yat Tung Estate (Yu Tung Road)	→	Tung Chung North (Caribbean Coast)	North Lantau	School days only
37S	Tung Chung Pier		Tung Chung station	North Lantau	Saturdays, Sundays and public holidays service only
38	Yat Tung Estate	↺	Tung Chung Town Centre	North Lantau	Circular route
38X	Yat Tung Estate (Yu Tung Road)	↺	Tung Chung Town Centre	North Lantau	Circular route, weekday morning peak hour service only
39M	Mun Tung Estate	↺	Tung Chung station	North Lantau	Circular route
N1	Mui Wo	→	Tai O	South Lantau	Night Ride Service
N37	Ying Tung Estate		Tung Chung station	North Lantau	Circular route, Night Ride Service
N38	Yat Tung Estate	↔	Tung Chung station	North Lantau	Night Ride Service
X11R	Sheraton Hong Kong Tung Chung Hotel	↔	Tai O	North-South Lantau	Saturdays, Sundays and public holidays service only

== Border shuttle routes ==
These routes travel to border checkpoints at Lok Ma Chau station, Shenzhen Bay Port, Hong Kong–Zhuhai–Macau Bridge, Heung Yuen Wai Port and Huanggang Port.

Route	Terminals			Operator	Notes
B1	Tin Tsz	↔	Lok Ma Chau Station	KMB	
B1	Ma Wang Road (San Shui House)	↔	Lok Ma Chau station	KMB	special service
B2	Yuen Long station	↔	Shenzhen Bay Port	NLB	
B2P	Tin Shui Wai (Tin Tsz Estate)	↔	Shenzhen Bay Port	NLB	
B2X	Tin Shui Wai (Tin Yiu Estate)	↔	Shenzhen Bay Port	NLB	
B3	Tuen Mun Ferry Pier	↔	Shenzhen Bay Port	CTB	
B3A	Shan King Estate (King Lok House)	↔	Shenzhen Bay Port	CTB	
B3A	Wo Tin Estate	→	Shenzhen Bay Port	CTB	Specific Service Hours only
B3M	Shenzhen Bay Port	↺	Tuen Mun station	CTB	
B3X	Tuen Mun Town Centre	↔	Shenzhen Bay Port	CTB	
B4	HZMB Hong Kong Port	↺	Airport	NLB	
B5	Sunny Bay station	↔	HZMB Hong Kong Port	CTB	
B6	Mun Tung Estate	↔	HZMB Hong Kong Port	NLB	
B6S	Mun Tung Estate	→	HZMB Hong Kong Port	NLB	AM Peak Hours only
B7	Sheung Shui (Po Wan Road)	↔	Heung Yuen Wai Port	CTB	
B7	Fanling station	↔	Heung Yuen Wai Port	CTB	
B7X	Sheung Shui Station	↔	Heung Yuen Wai Port	CTB	specified service dates only
B8	Tai Wai station	↔	Heung Yuen Wai Port	CTB	
B9	Tuen Mun station	↔	Heung Yuen Wai Port	KMB	
B9A	Yuen Long (West)	↔	Heung Yuen Wai Port	KMB	
B10	Kwai Fong (Kwai Tsui Estate)	↔	Huanggang Port	KMB	
B11	Tin Fu	↔	Huanggang Port	KMB	
B11	Yuen Long Plaza	→	Huanggang Port	KMB	special service
B11	Huanggang Port	→	Tai Tong Road Yuen Long	KMB	special service
B12	Wu Kai Sha station	↔	Huanggang Port	NLB	
B13	Siu Sai Wan (Island Resort)	↔	Huanggang Port	CTB	
B14	Kai Tak (Olympic Avenue)	↔	Huanggang Port	CTB	Peak Hours only
B15	Tuen Mun (Castle Peak Bay)	↔	Huanggang Port	CTB	Weekends and Public Holidays only
NB73	Sha Tin Central	↔	Huanggang Port	KMB	Night Service
XB2	Yuen Long station	↔	Shenzhen Bay Port	NLB	Weekends and Public Holidays only

== See also ==
- Hong Kong bus route numbering
- Transport in Hong Kong
