= Tuen Mun Government Secondary School =

- 屯門官立中學
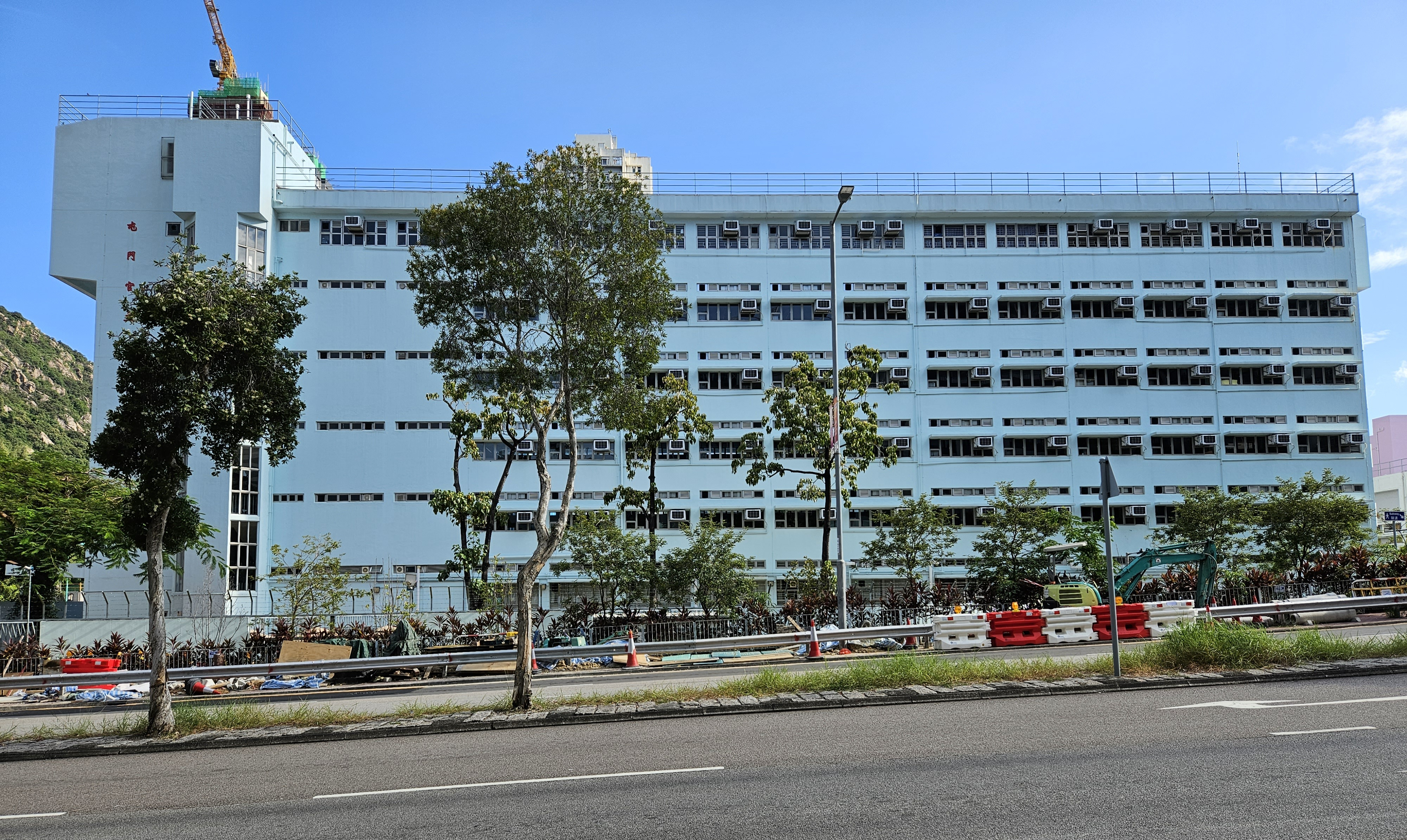
- 393 Castle Peak Road, Castle Peak Bay, Tuen Mun, New Territories, Hong Kong

Information
- Type: Government School, secondary, co-educational.
- Motto: 尊德問學
- Established: 1982; 44 years ago
- Principal: Ms. LI Wai-bing
- Staff: about 60
- Enrollment: about 1250
- Information: (852) 24580459
- Language of instruction: English
- Number of Class: 31
- Website: http://www.tmgss.edu.hk

Tuen Mun Government Secondary School (TMGSS/TMS, Chinese: 屯門官立中學/屯官) is a secondary school in Tuen Mun, Hong Kong founded by the Hong Kong Government. Located at Castle Peak Road near Castle Peak Bay, the school offers classes and uses English as the medium of instruction. It was founded in 1982 and was the first government school in Tuen Mun. Tuen Mun Government Primary School is a feeder school to TMGSS. Hong Kong Christian Service Pui Oi School and Shenzhen Futian Middle School are partner schools of TMGSS.

== Class structure ==
Tuen Mun Government Secondary School has 31 classes in total, with 5 classes each in S.1 to S.5 and 3 classes in S.6. Due to participation in the voluntary class reduction scheme, the number of classes in each level is reduced to 4 starting from year 2011/12. During the transition period of the implementation of the new senior secondary curriculum, the school will have altogether 32 classes (4 in S.1, 5 in S.1 to S.6, 3 in S.7) in year 11/12, which is the highest since its foundation.

== New senior secondary curriculum ==
The School provides 11 elective subjects in New Senior Secondary Curriculum (NSS) and forms school cluster with 3 secondary schools in Tuen Mun District to provide 3 more subjects. There are altogether 14 subjects available.

The school offers places for students from cluster schools in the following subjects: Health Management & Social Care, Tourism & Hospitality Studies, Chinese History. Students can select 2 to 3 subjects. Those taking 3 electives (i.e.3X) should choose one subject from each group without repetition. Those taking 2 electives (i.e.2X) should choose one subject from group 2 and another one from group 1 or 3, and they must have English, Chinese and Mathematics (ECM) enrichment classes.

Students can also take Applied Learning (ApL) courses as one of the elective in S.5 and S.6. The school streams classes according to the choice of the subjects in group 2. The arrangements of elective subjects for the first two NSS school year are not the same. The school also provides mathematics extended module 2 (Algebra & Calculus) for students starting from S.5. The module 2 lessons occupy part of the normal mathematics lessons and a period of time after school.

Elective Subjects for First NSS School Year ^{[a]}
Group	Class					
Group	A	B	C	D	E	U
Group 1	Chemistry Information & Communication Technology; Health & Social Care Management; Business, Accounting & Financial Studies; Geography; Chinese Literature*; Visual Arts*					English, Chinese and Mathematics Enrichment Class(1)
Group 2	Physics	Chemistry	Combined Science (Chemistry+Biology)^{[b]}	Business, Accounting & Financial Studies	Economics	／
Group 3	Biology Physics; Economics; Tourism & Hospitality Studies; Chinese History^{[c]} Physical Education*					English, Chinese and Mathematics Enrichment Class(2)

Elective Subjects for Second NSS School Year
Group	Class					
Group	A	B	C	D	E	U
Group 1	Chemistry Physics; Chinese History; Geography; Health & Social Care Management; Visual Arts*; Physical Education*					English, Chinese and Mathematics Enrichment Class(1)
Group 2	Biology	Chemistry	Chinese Literature/ Information & Communication Technology^{[d]}	Business, Accounting & Financial Studies	Economics	/
Group 3	Biology Physics; Economics; Business, Accounting & Financial Studies; Tourism & Hospitality Studies; Music*; Visual Arts*					English, Chinese and Mathematics Enrichment Class(2)

*Subjects provided by cluster schools

Subjects provided by cluster schools
School	Subject
South Tuen Mun Government Secondary School	Chinese Literature
South Tuen Mun Government Secondary School	Combined Science (Physics+Chemistry)^{[e]}
Ho Ngai College (Sponsored by Sik Sik Yuen)	Physical Education
Ho Ngai College (Sponsored by Sik Sik Yuen)	Visual Arts^{[f]}
CMA Choi Cheung Kok Secondary School	Visual Arts

== Footnotes ==
- a. As many students chose Business, Accounting & Financial Studies, the school provides it in group 3 too. In fact, Business, Accounting & Financial Studies is included in all 3 groups.
- b. Students taking Combined Science (Chemistry+Biology) can not take Chemistry or/and Biology at the same time.
- c. The school did not offer Chinese History but Business, Accounting & Financial Studies instead due to students' lack of interest in the subject.
- d. Students taking one of the two subjects are arranged to the same class but they are not taking both subjects.
- e. It was not offered due to students' lack of interest in the subject.
- f. It was provided since the second NSS school year.
