= Oscar by the Sea =

Residential estate in Tseung Kwan O, Hong Kong

Coordinates: 22.307599°N 114.267020°E

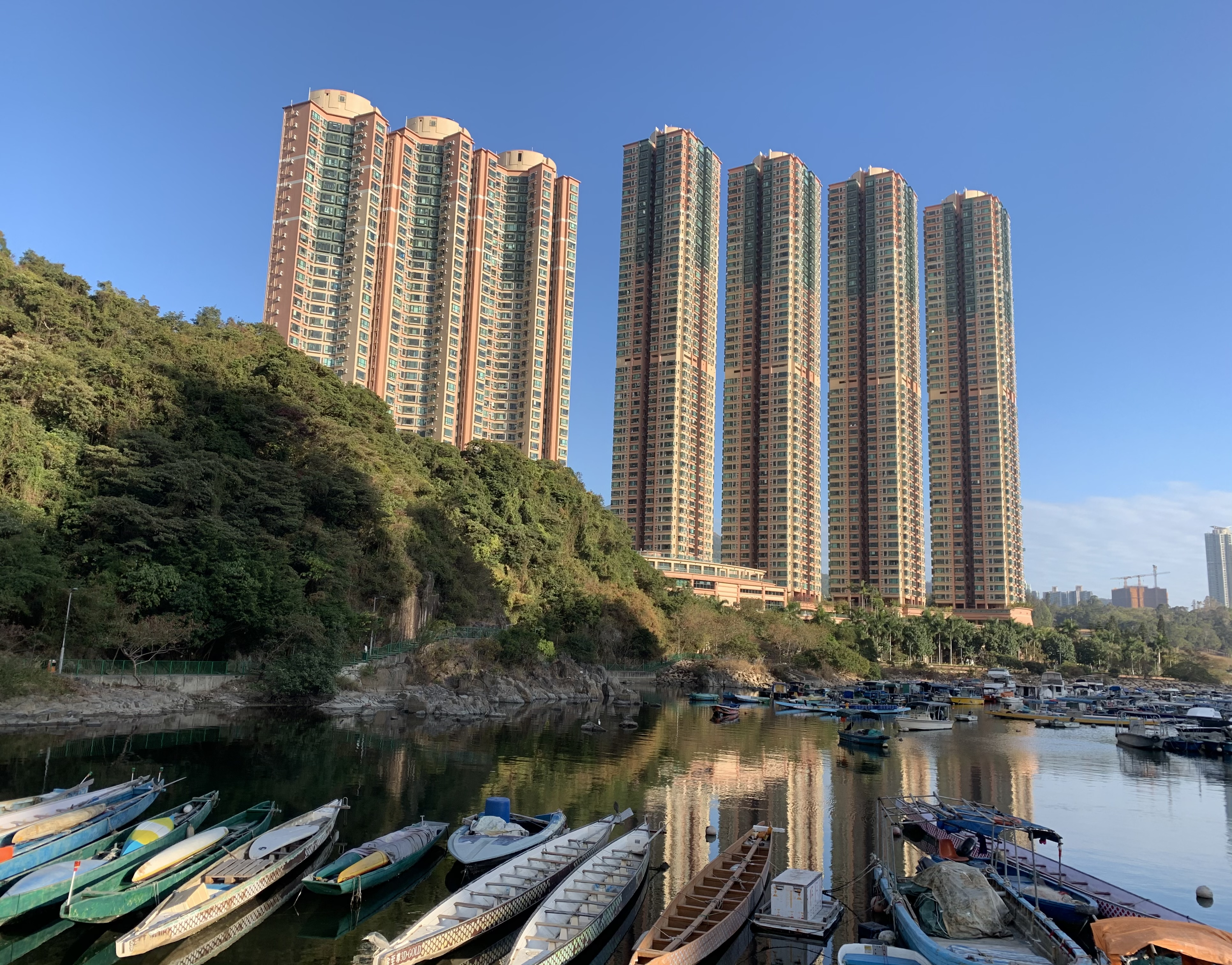
- Oscar by the Sea from the waterfront
- Interactive map of the Oscar by the Sea area

General information
- Status: Completed
- Location: 8 Pung Loi Road, Pak Shing Kok, Clear Water Bay, New Territories, Hong Kong
- Completed: 2002; 24 years ago
- Opening: May 2002; 23 years ago

Design and construction
- Architect: MCAA Limited
- Developer: Sun Hung Kai Properties, CapitaLand and Hong Kong Oxygen

Chinese name
- Traditional Chinese: 清水灣半島
Transcriptions
Yue: Cantonese
- Yale Romanization: Chīng séui wāan bun dóu
- Jyutping: Cing1 seoi2 waan1 bun3 dou2

Oscar by the Sea is a riverside private housing residences located at 8 Pung Loi Road, Pak Shing Kok, Clear Water Bay, New Territories, Hong Kong. The residence is jointly developed by Sun Hung Kai Properties, CapitaLand and Hong Kong Oxygen. It was designed by MCAA Limited.

The property is divided into 7 buildings with 40 to 59 floors and a total of 1959 units. The estate was opened for sale in 2001 on 27 July 2001 (Phase 1), 1 June 2002 (Phase 2). The management company is Hong Yip Service Co. Ltd. under Sun Hung Kai Properties. Oscar by the Sea is the only private housing estate in Tseung Kwan O that is not built on reclaimed land.
