= Olympian City =

Housing and shopping complex in Hong Kong

Coordinates: 22°19′10″N 114°09′30″E

- 奧海城
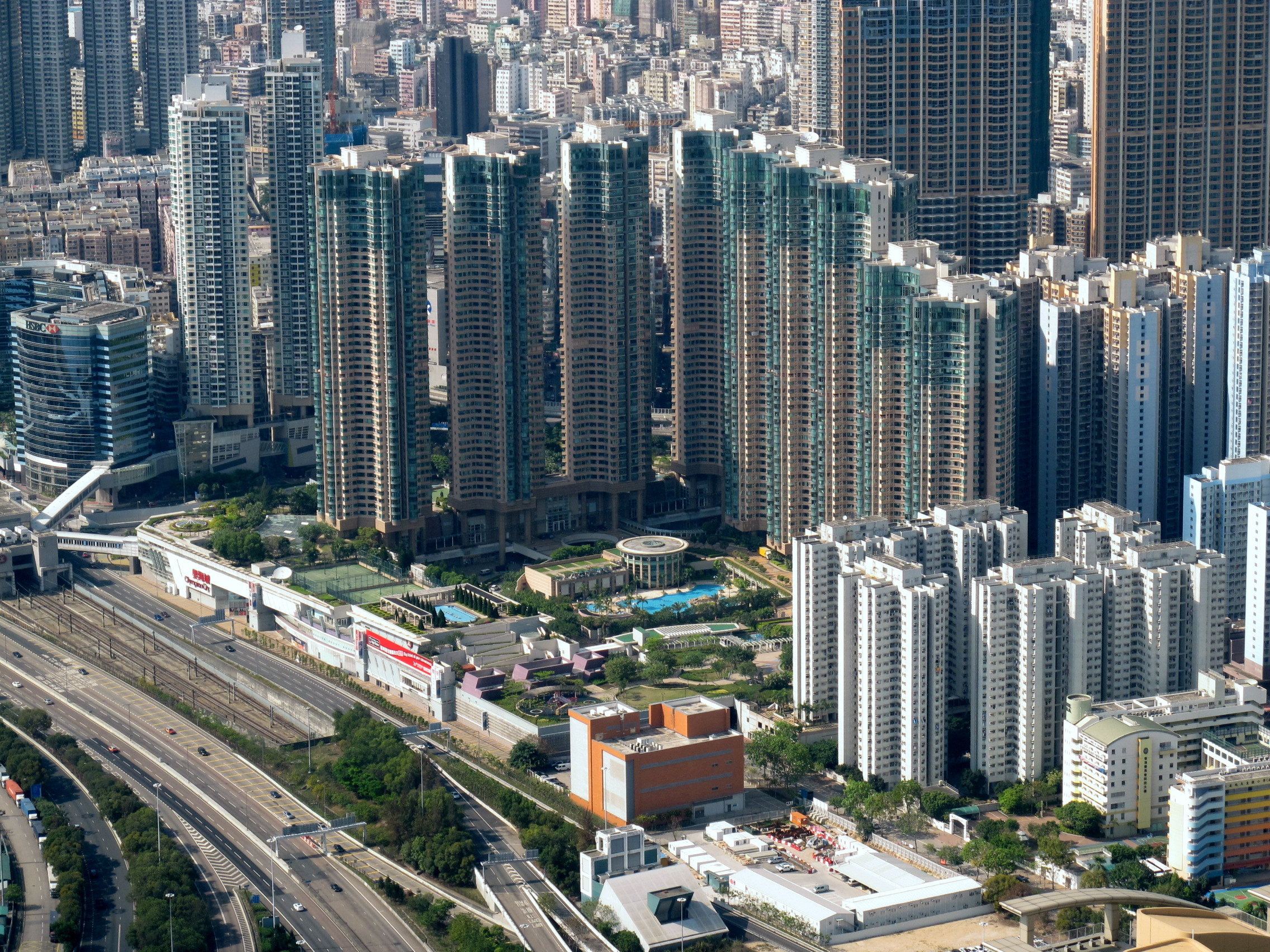
- Location: Tai Kok Tsui, Hong Kong
- Address: 18 Hoi Ting Road, West Kowloon, Hong Kong
- Opened: 2000; 26 years ago (Phase 1); 2001; 25 years ago (Phase 2); 2011; 15 years ago (Phase 3)
- Developer: Sino Land

Olympian City (Chinese: 奧海城; Jyutping: ou3 hoi2 sing4) is a shopping and residential complex built on reclaimed land in Tai Kok Tsui, Kowloon, Hong Kong, next to the MTR Olympic station. It is one of the main shopping and residential areas in West Kowloon. The shopping arcades, Olympian City 1, 2 and 3, were developed by Sino Land while the residential buildings were developed by MTR Corporation and Sino Land.

== Phases ==
There were three phases in the development of the Olympian City project:

- Phase I included Island Harbourview, HSBC Centre, Bank of China Centre and Olympian City 1, which were completed from 1998 to 2000.
- Phase II included Park Avenue, Central Park and Olympian City 2, which were completed from 2000 to 2002.
- Phase III included The Hermitage and Olympian City 3, which were completed in 2011.

Note that the nearby development of Olympic Station Package 3 (Harbour Green, developed by Sun Hung Kai Properties) was not part of the Olympian City project.

== Shopping arcades ==
=== Olympian City 1 ===
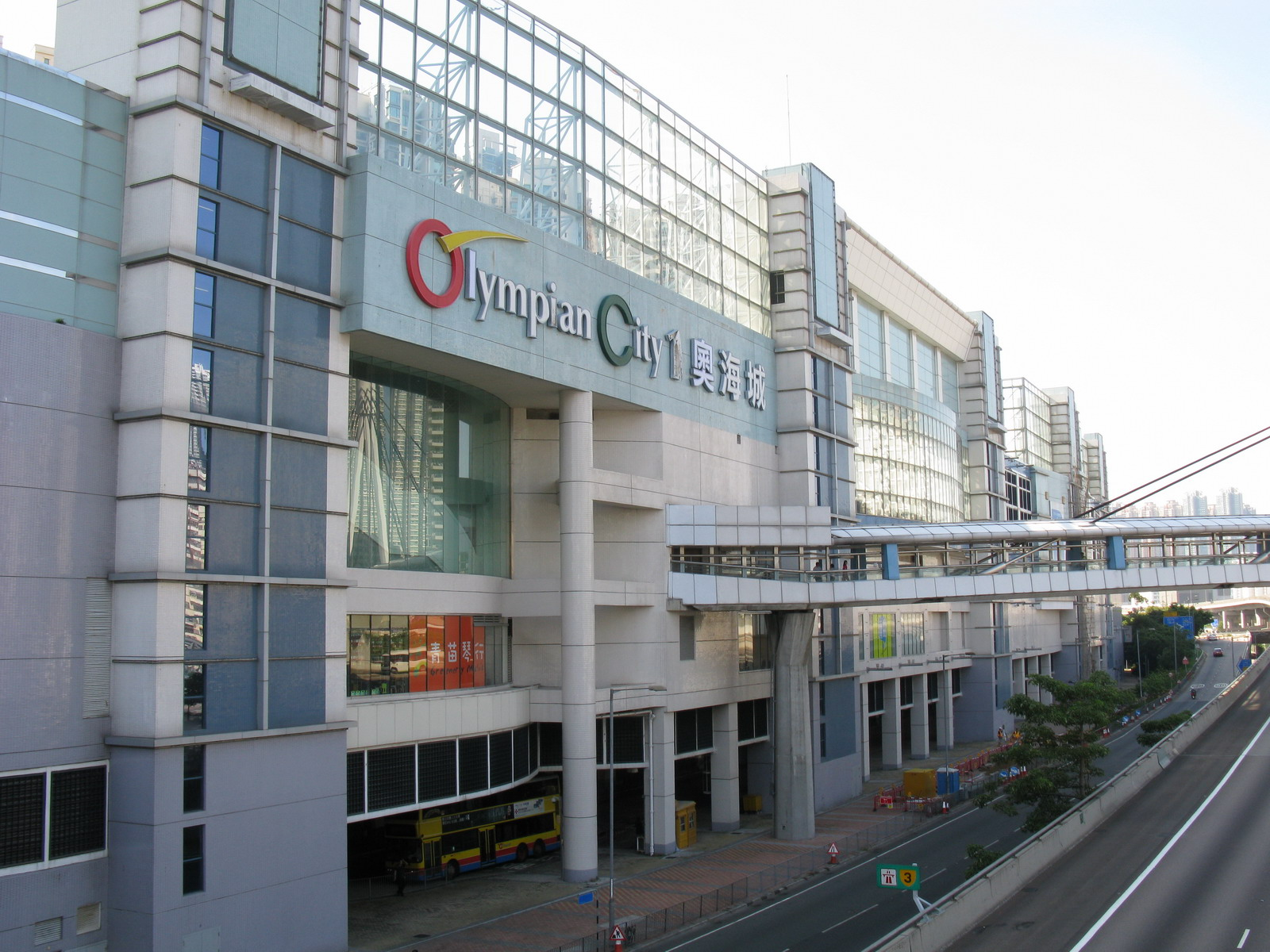
Olympian City 1

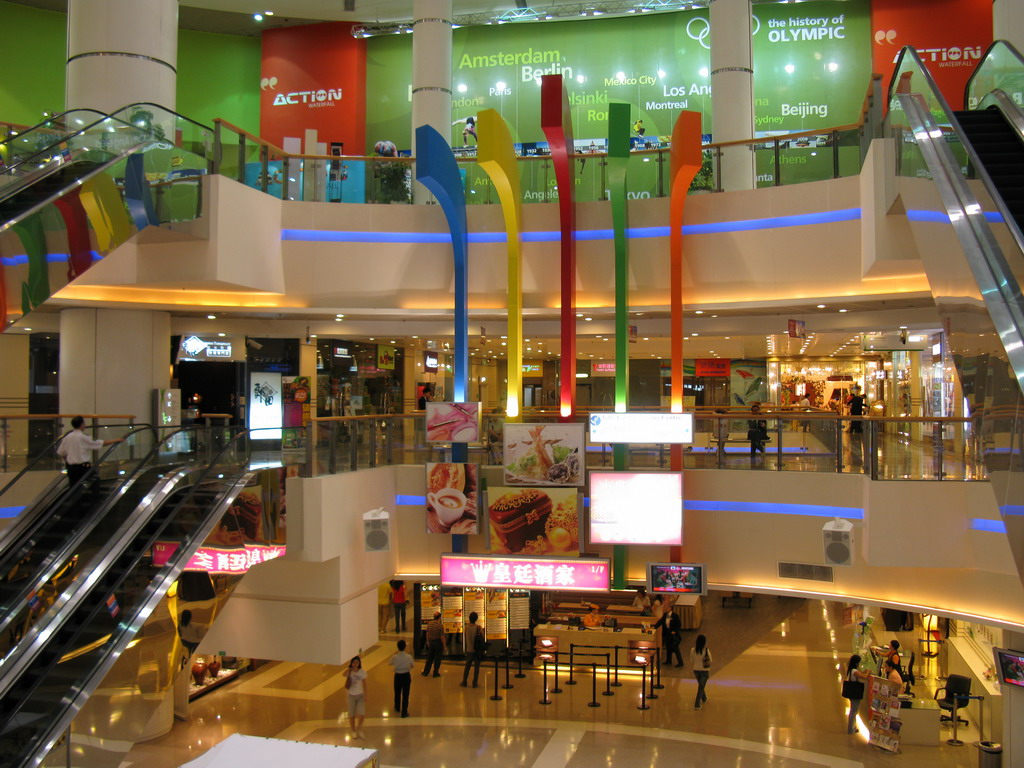
Plaza in Olympian City 1

Olympian City 1 is located at exit A of Olympic station, which was developed by Sino Land and completed in 2000. It covers the area of 200,000 square feet (19,000 m^{2}) of retail space spread over three floors, with 30 plus stores. The stores include Chinese restaurants and Western restaurants, lifestyle stores, spa centres, special interests and hobby outlets.

=== Olympian City 2 ===
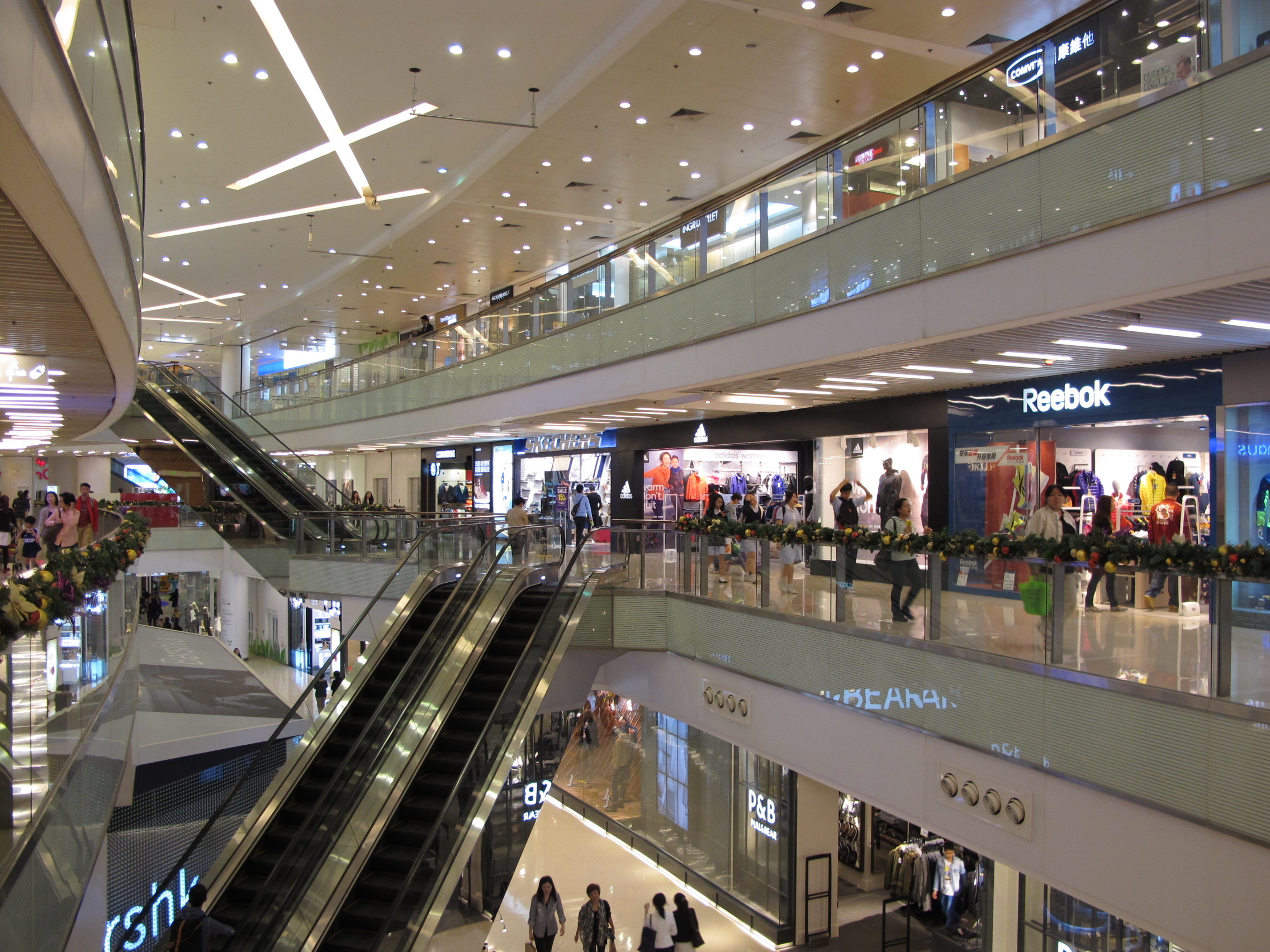
Olympian City Phase 2

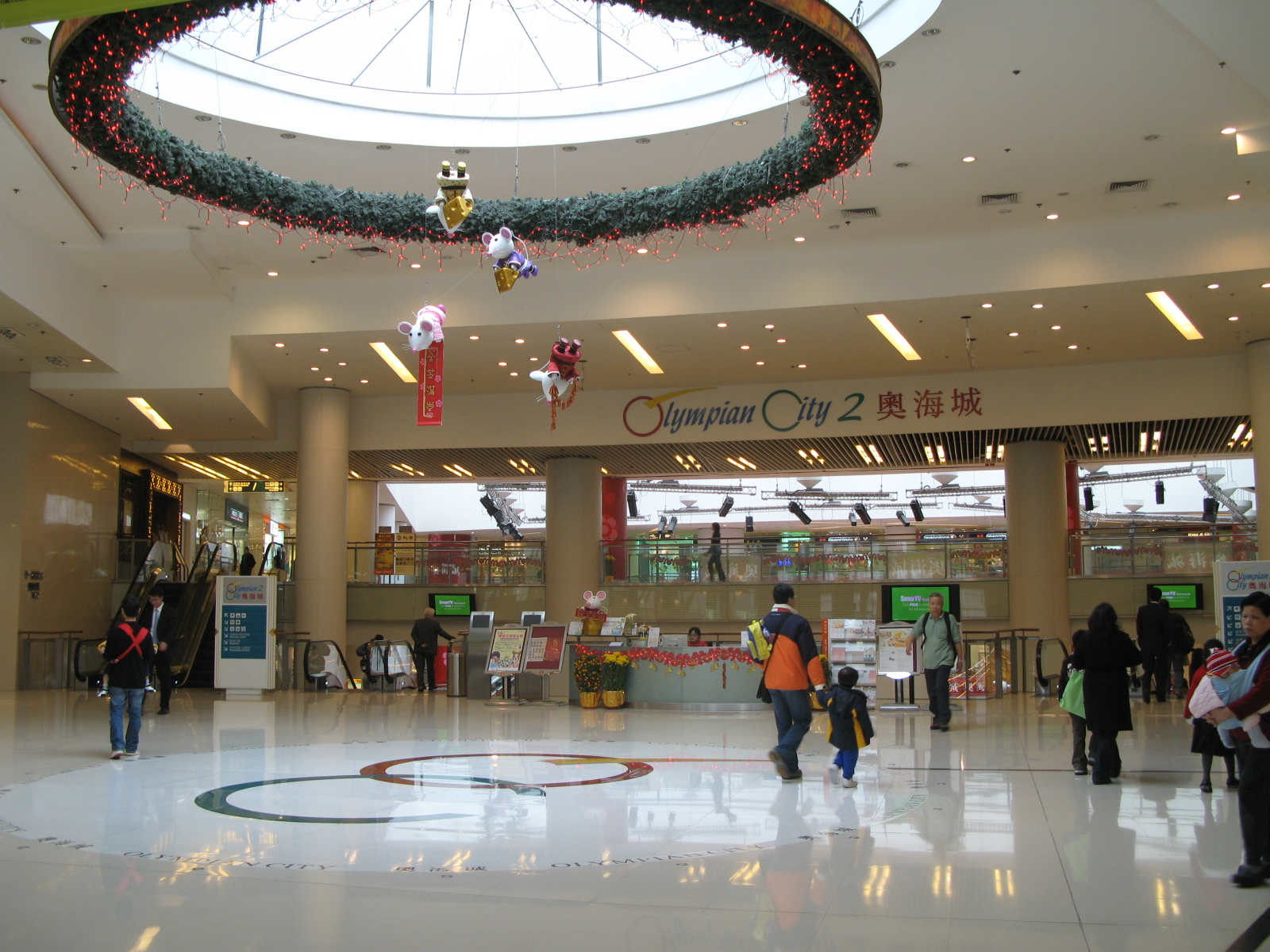
West Atrium, Olympian City 2

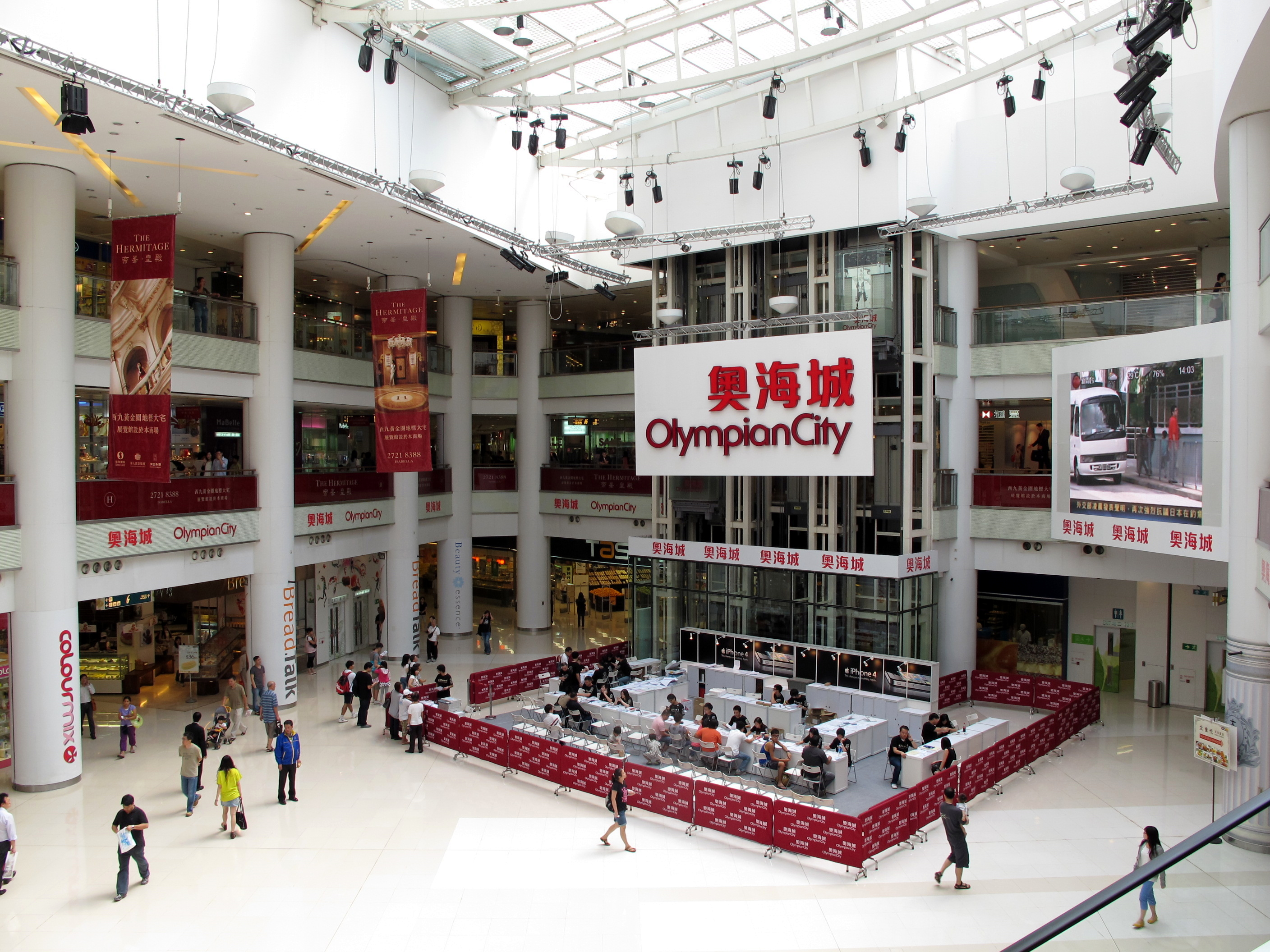
Central Atrium, Olympian City 2

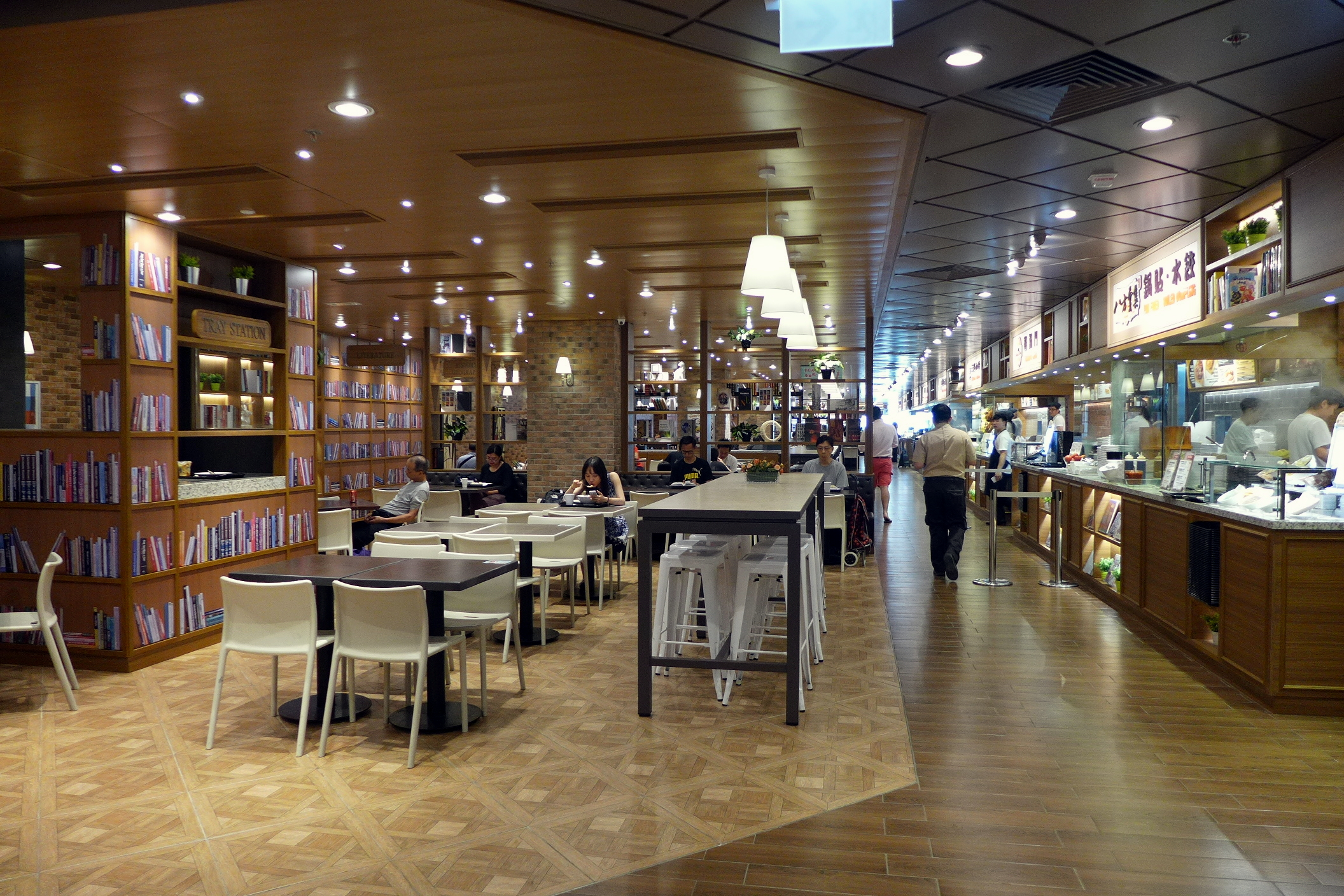
Food court in Olympian City 2

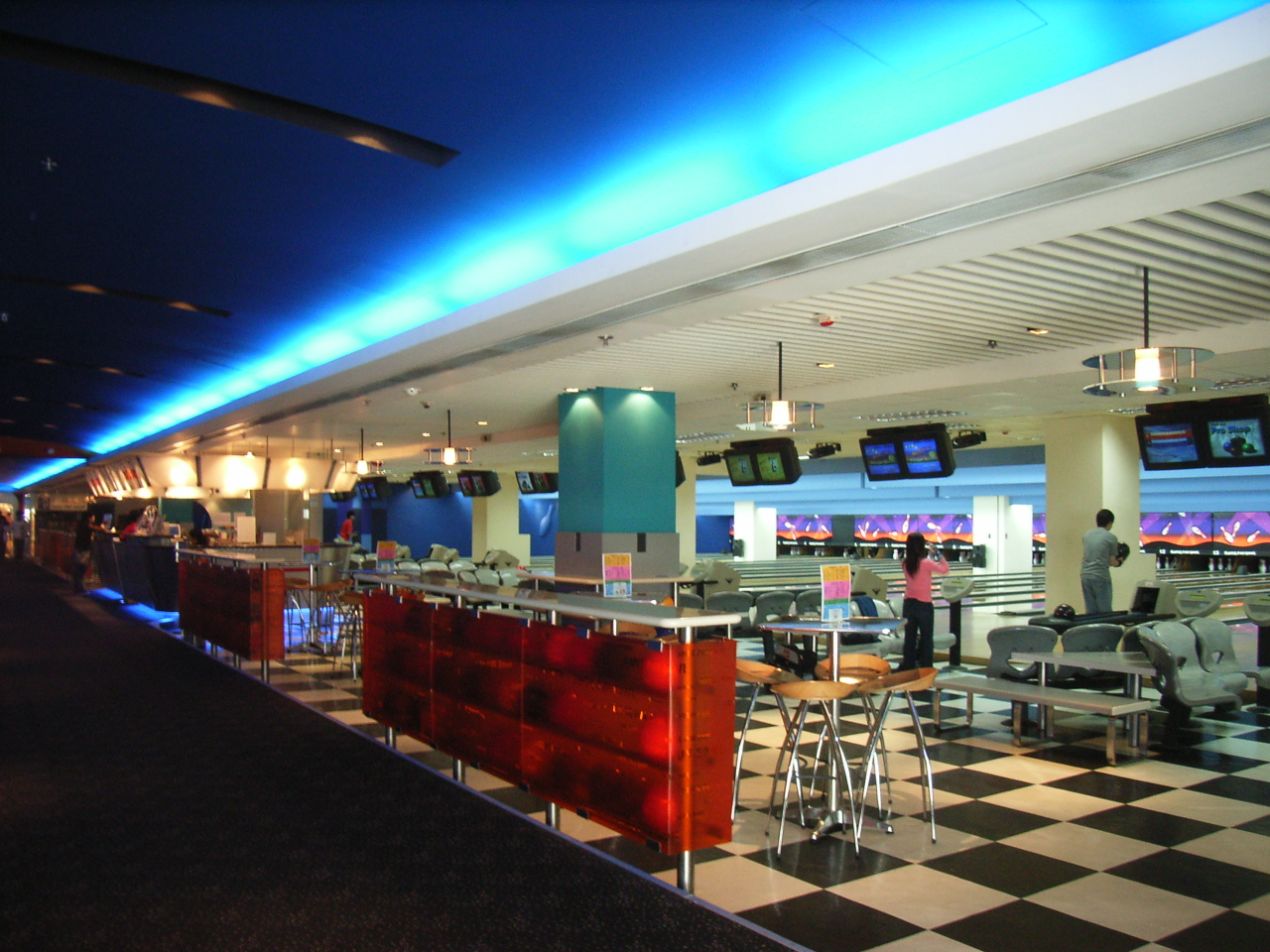
Bowling alley in Olympian City 2 (Closed)

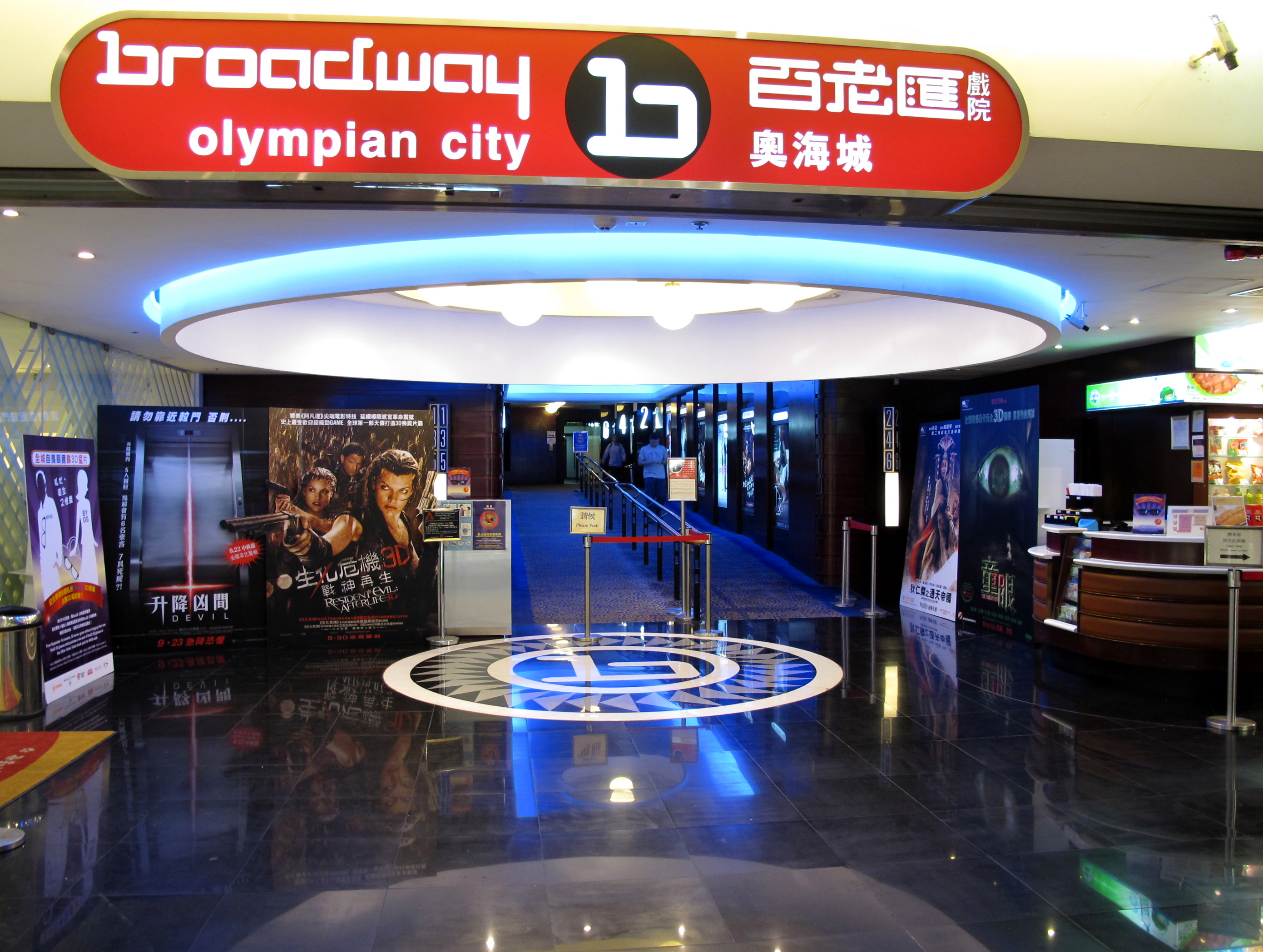
Former Broadway Cinema in Olympian City 2

Olympian City 2 is located at exit D of Olympic station, which was developed Sino Land and completed in 2001. It covers an area of 600,000 square feet (56,000 m^{2}) of retail space spread over three floors, with 180 plus stores. The store includes fashion boutiques, jewellery shops, speciality lifestyle stores, a bowling alley and a cinema complex.

In September 2012, Hong Kong lifestyle retail store G.O.D. in co-operation with Sino Art, held The Street Market Symphony Exhibition at Olympian City 2, their first solo art exhibition in a shopping mall. The exhibition used multi-media installations housed in large red lampshades, the iconic representation of Hong Kong's wet markets.

=== Olympian City 3 ===
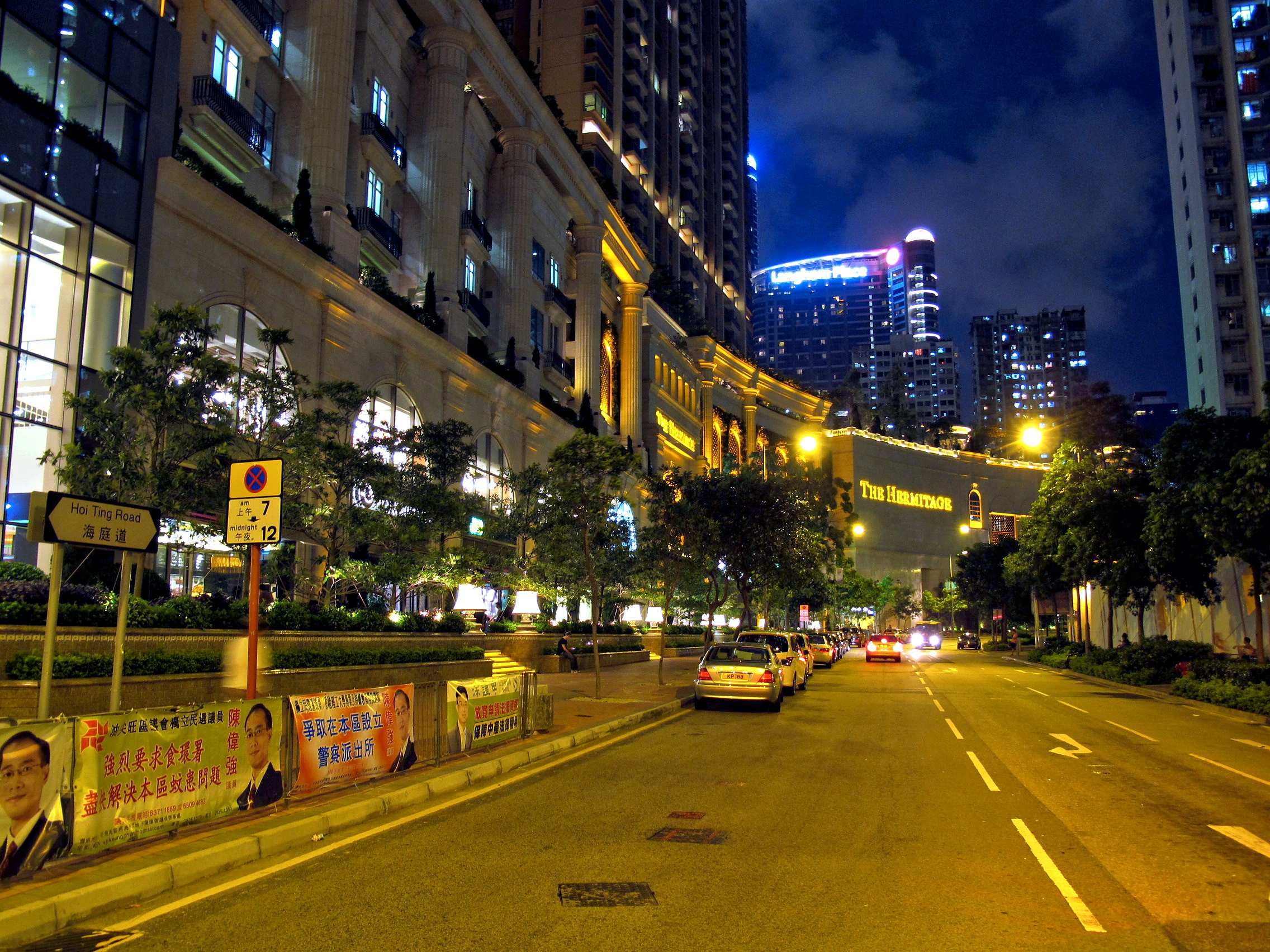
Exterior of the mall

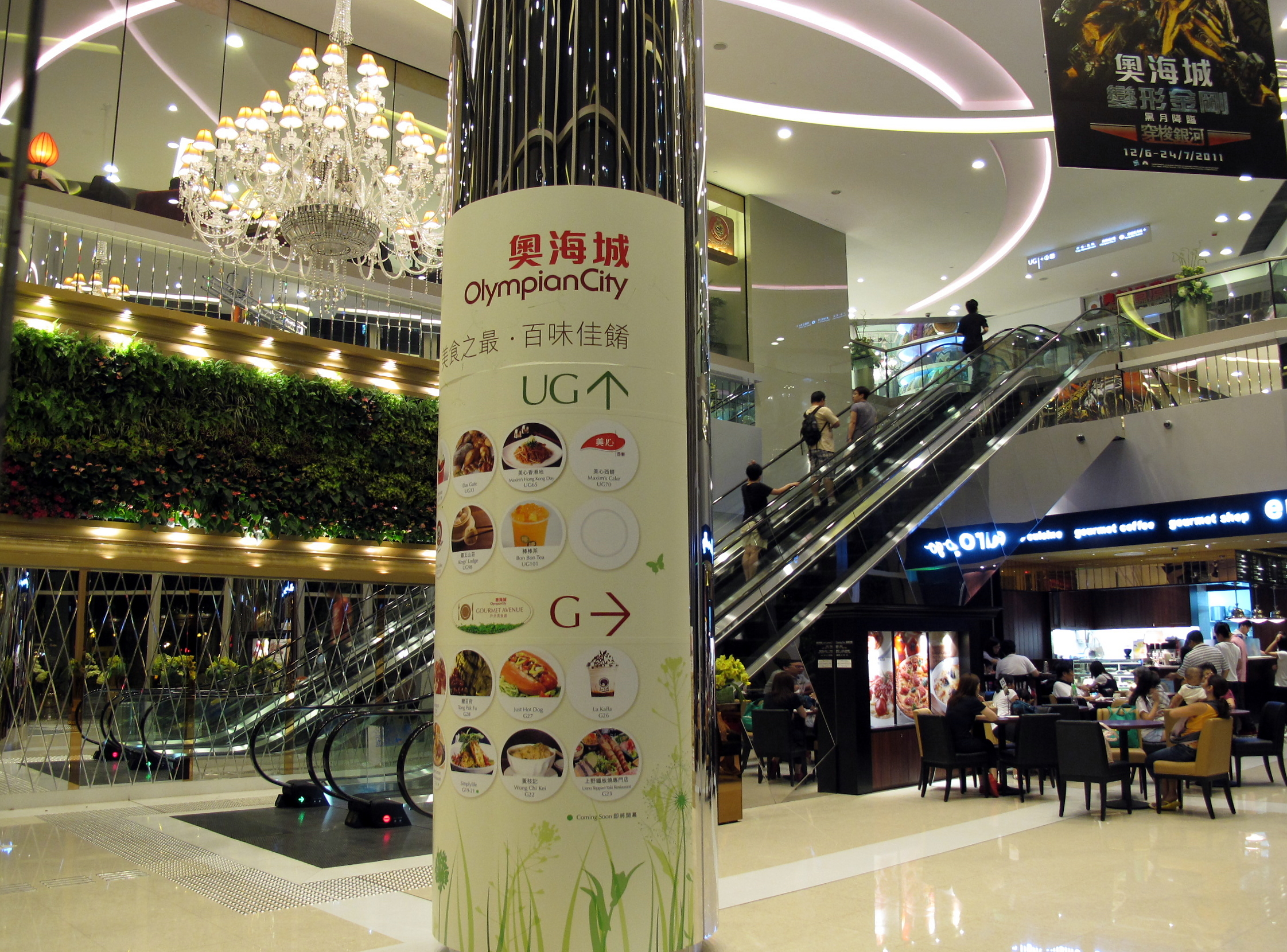
Crystal Light in the atrium

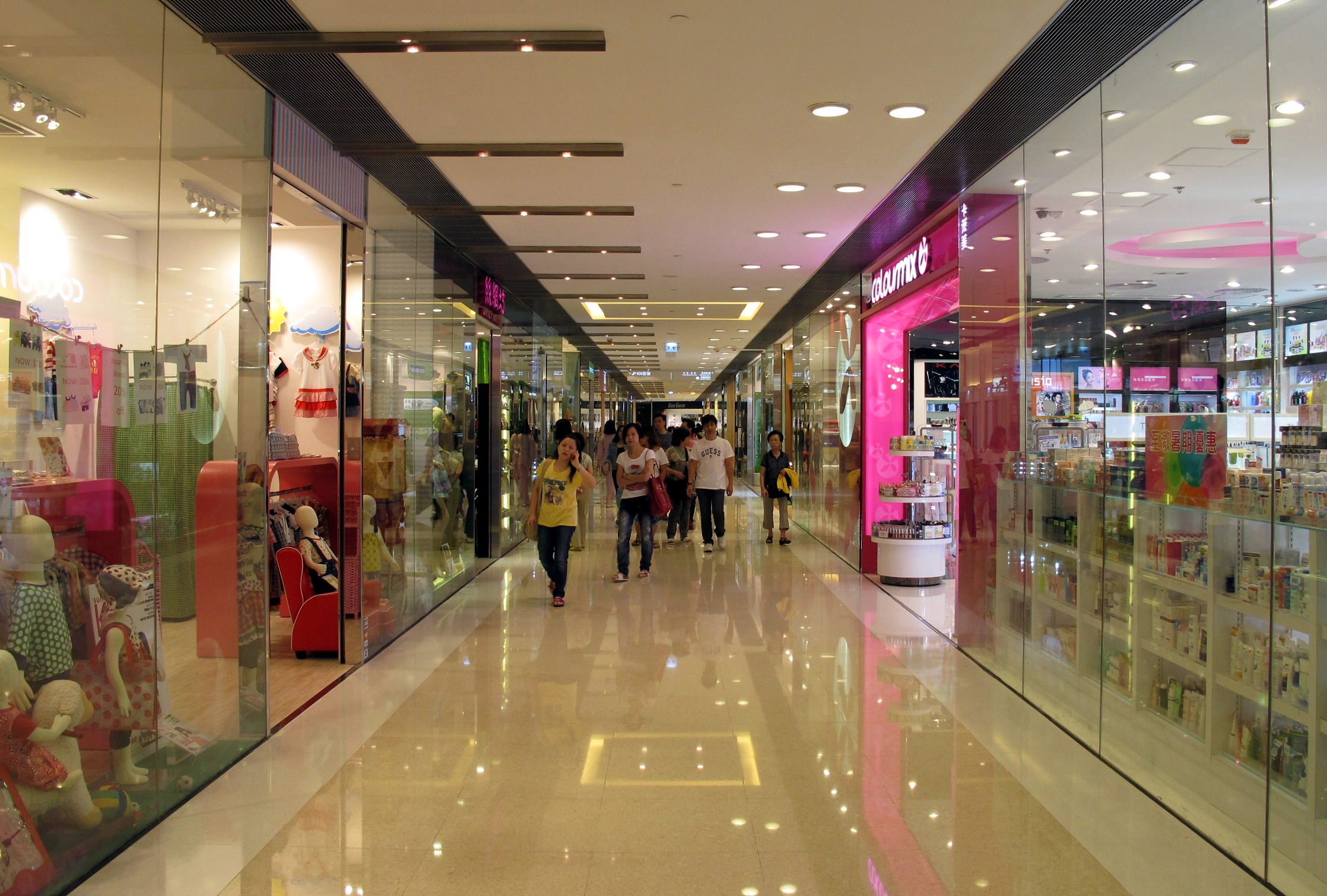
Access of UG Floor

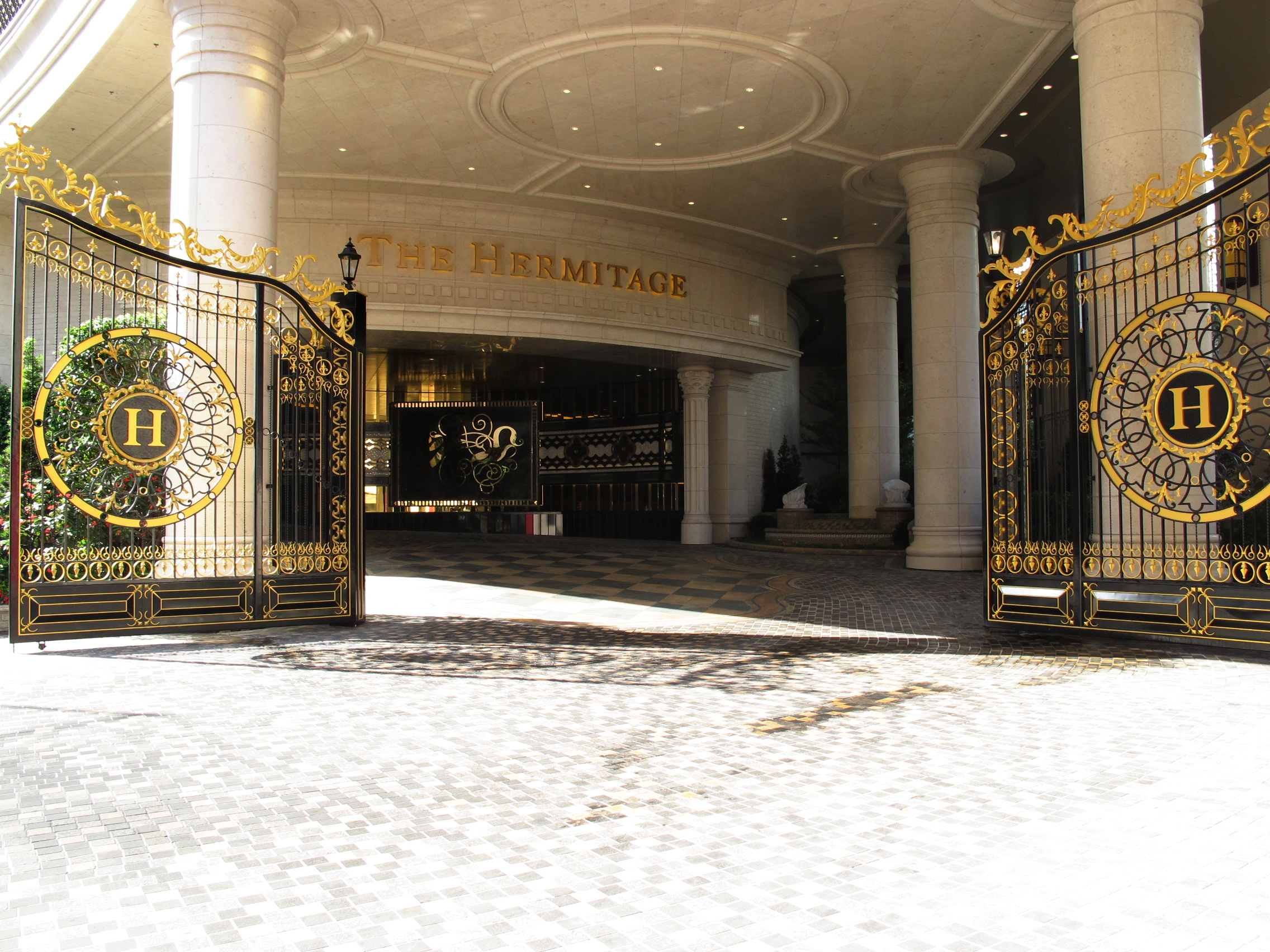
Car park entrance

Olympian City 3 is located in the East of Olympian City 2 with a connecting bridge in between. The nearest MTR stations are Olympic station (Exit D) which can be reached by walking past Olympian City 2, and Mong Kok station (Exit C4) and reached by walking along Argyle Street Westbound. The mall completed in 2011 and there are two floors with over 70 stores.

== Residential estates ==
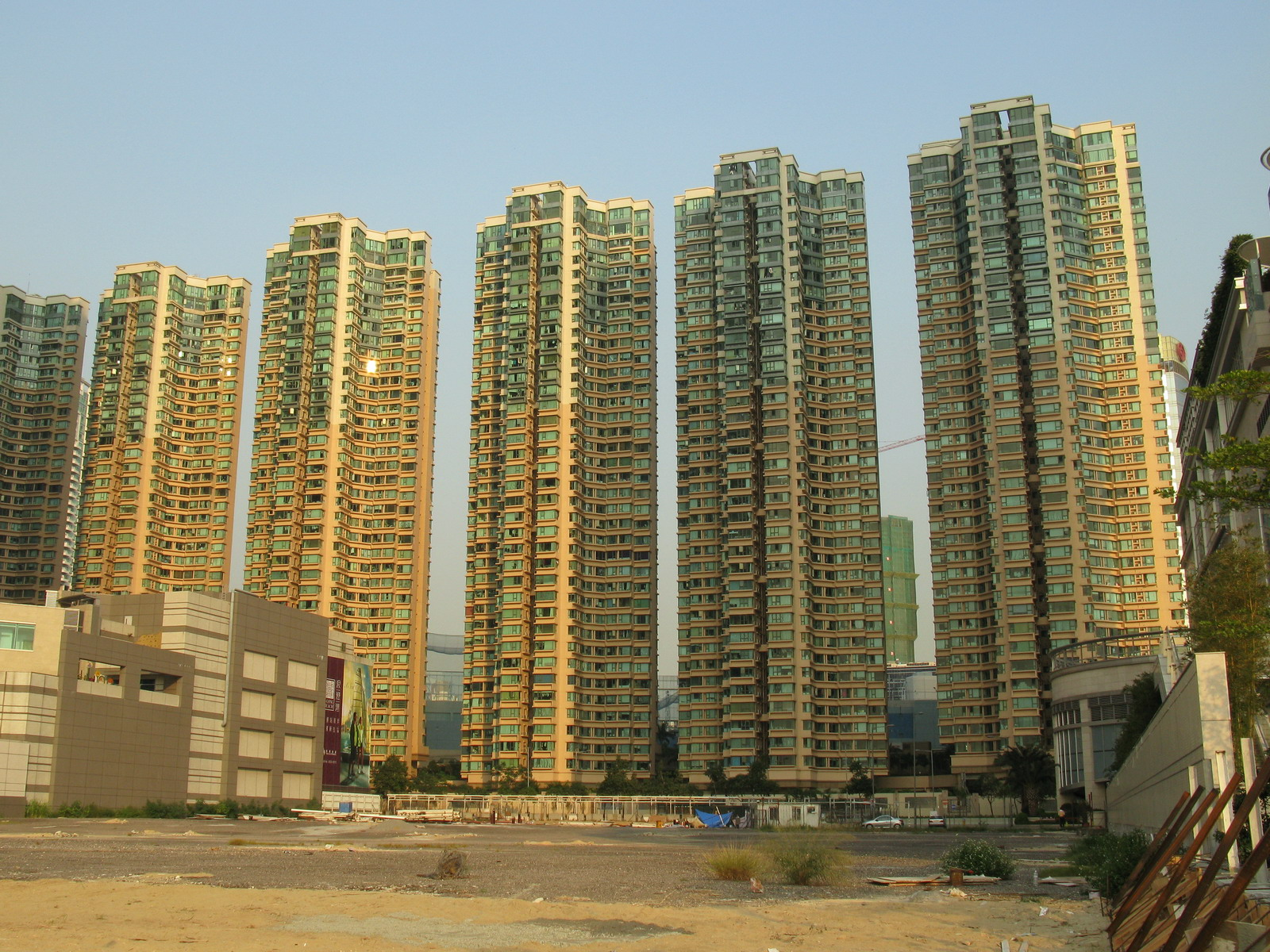
Island Harbourview

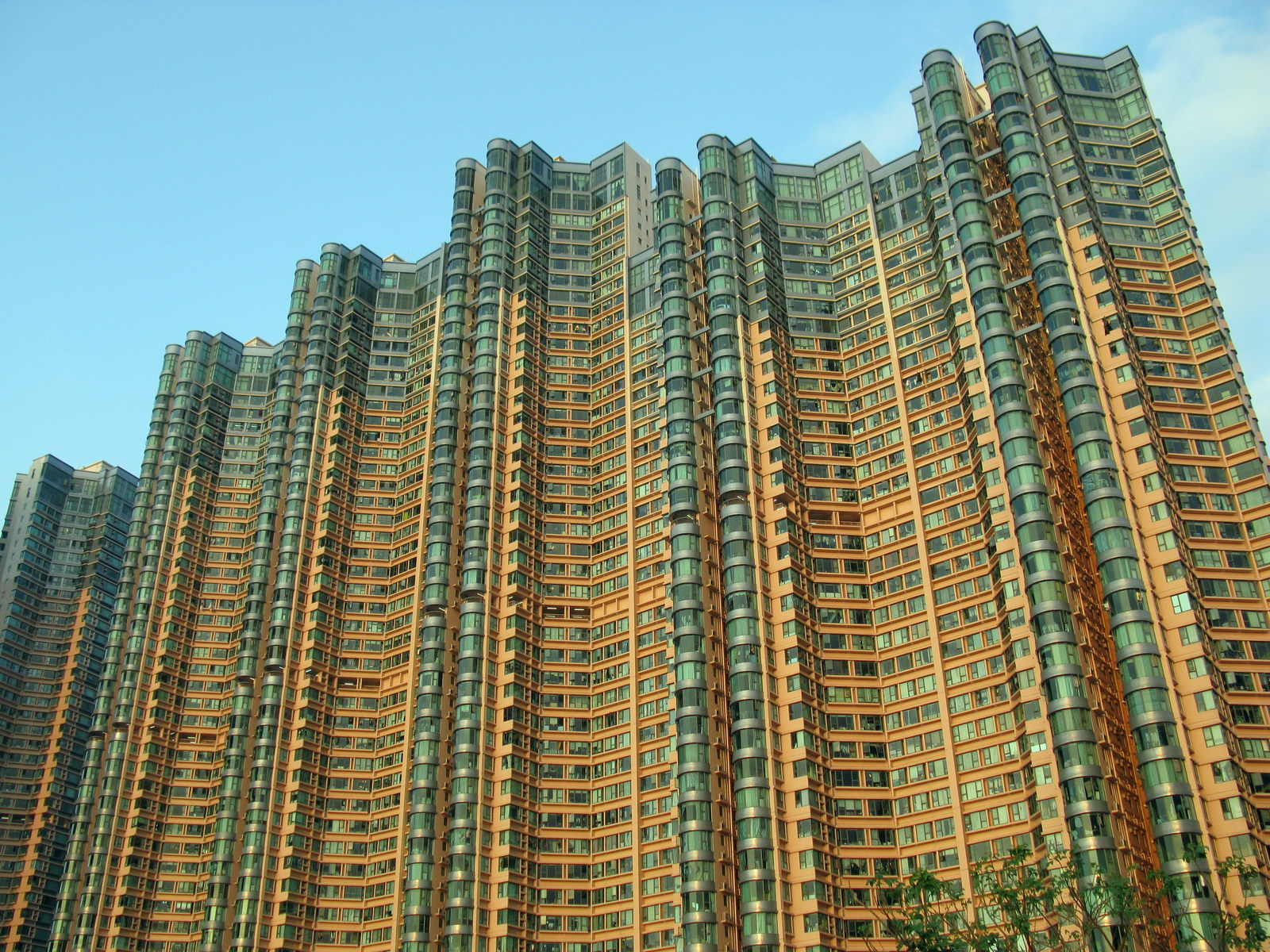
Park Avenue

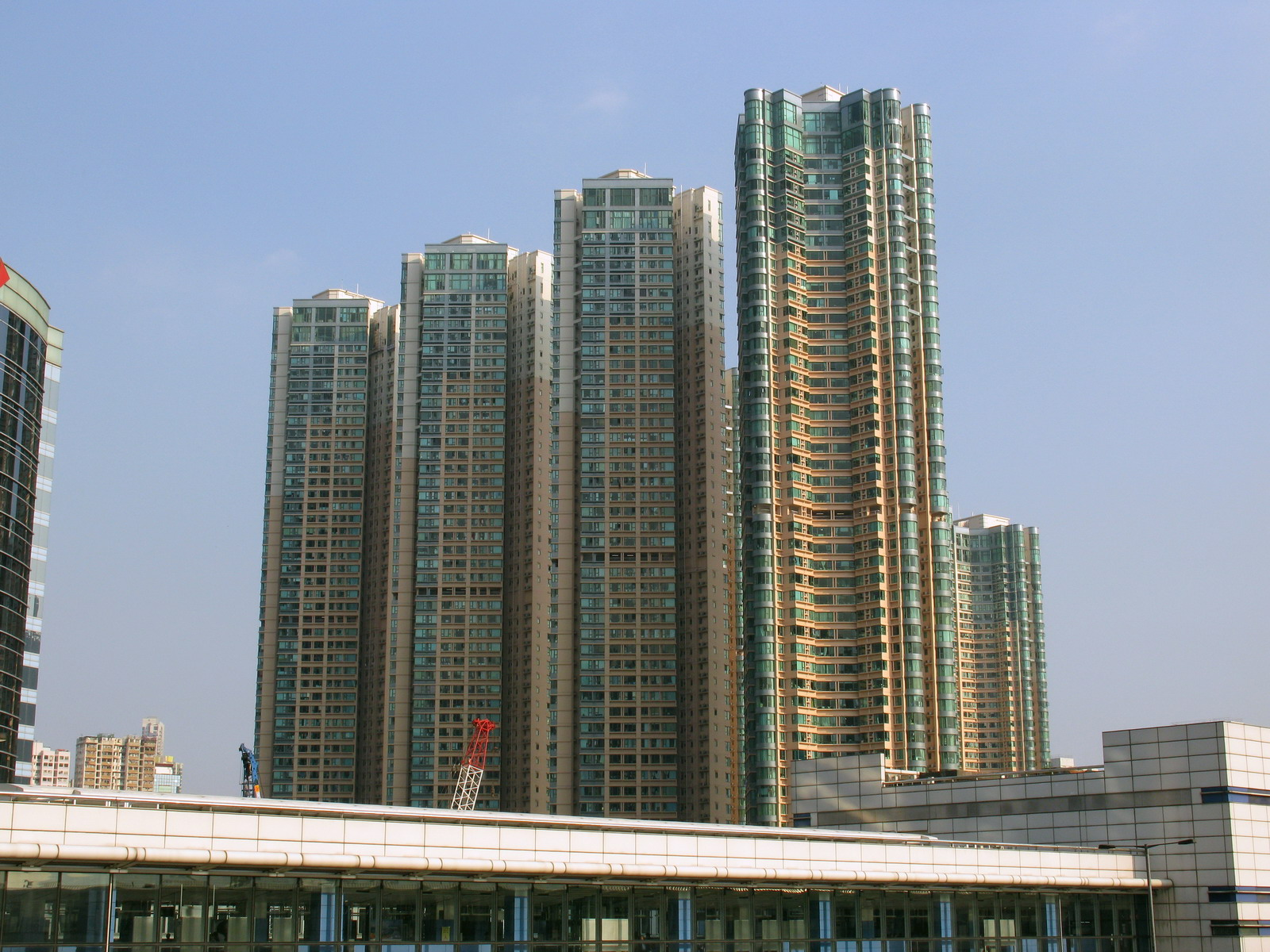
Central Park

There are four main private housing estates in the Olympian City project, Island Harbourview, Park Avenue, Central Park and The Hermitage which were all developed by Sino Land and MTR Corporation. There are many other residential estates surrounding Olympian City and Olympic station: One Silver Sea, Imperial Cullinan, The Long Beach, Hampton Place, Florient Rise, Harbour Green, Charming Garden and Hoi Fu Court.

== Office ==
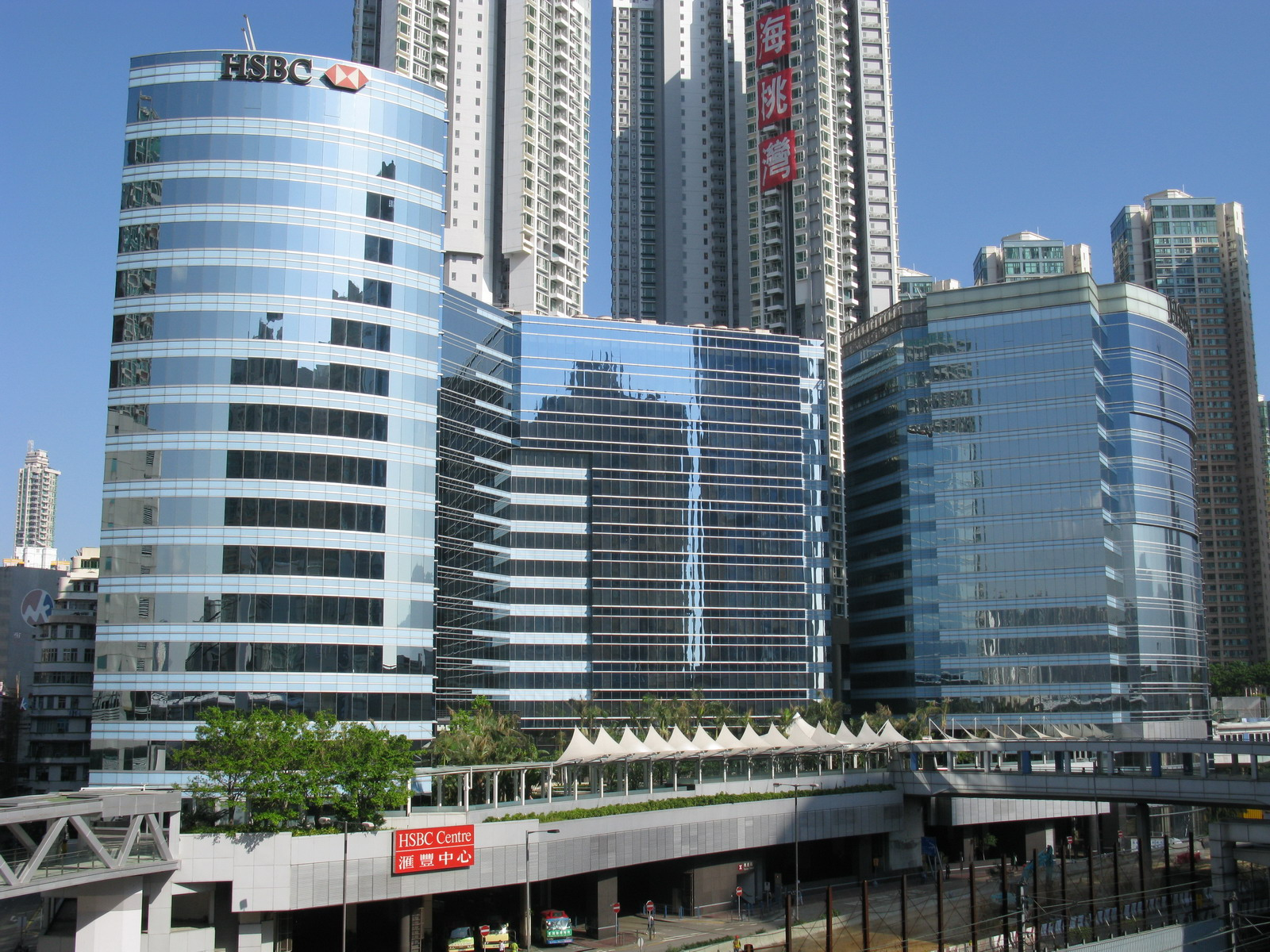
HSBC Centre

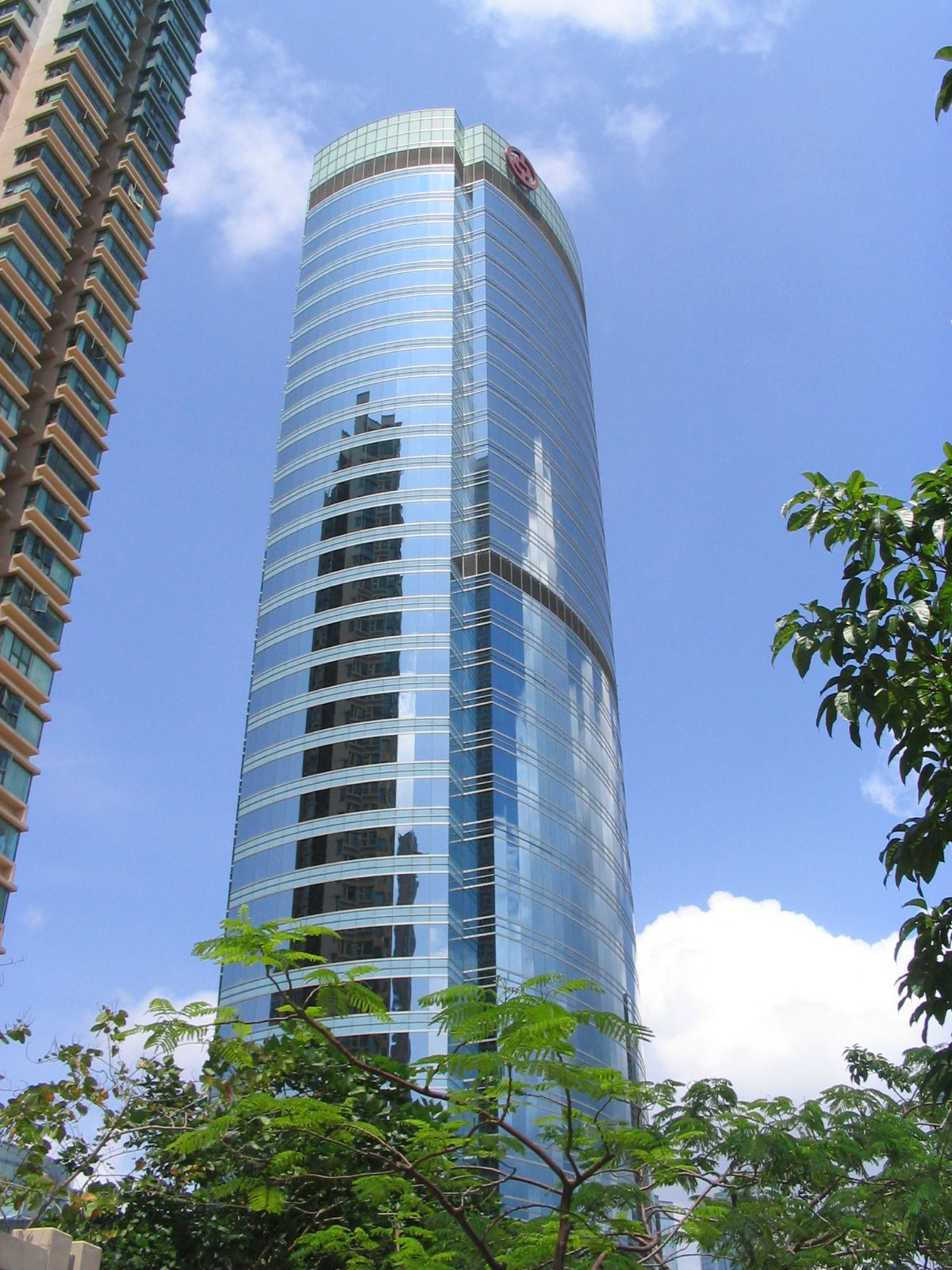
Bank of China Centre

There are four office towers in Olympian City, HSBC Centre (three towers) and Bank of China Centre (one tower). They were developed by Sino Land, but were sold to HSBC and Bank of China (Hong Kong) respectively for their back office headquarters.

== See also ==
- Island Harbourview
- Park Avenue
- Central Park
- HSBC Centre
- Bank of China Centre
