= Island Harbour =

Island Harbour may refer to:

- Island Harbour, Anguilla, a district in Anguilla
- Island Harbour (Anguilla House of Assembly Constituency), a constituency in Anguilla
- Island Harbour, Newfoundland and Labrador, a village in Canada
- Island Harbour Marina, a marina in the United Kingdom
- Island Harbourview, a housing development in Hong Kong
- Bluff Harbour, a harbour in New Zealand
