= Florient Rise =

Housing estate in Tai Kok Tsui, Kowloon

Coordinates: 22.3185°N 114.1614°E

- Traditional Chinese: 海桃灣
- Simplified Chinese: 海桃湾
Transcriptions
Standard Mandarin
- Hanyu Pinyin: Hǎi Táo Wān
Yue: Cantonese
- Jyutping: hoi2 tou4 waan1

Cherry Street Project
- Traditional Chinese: 櫻桃街項目
- Simplified Chinese: 樱桃街项目
Transcriptions
Standard Mandarin
- Hanyu Pinyin: Yīngtáo Jiē Xiàngmù

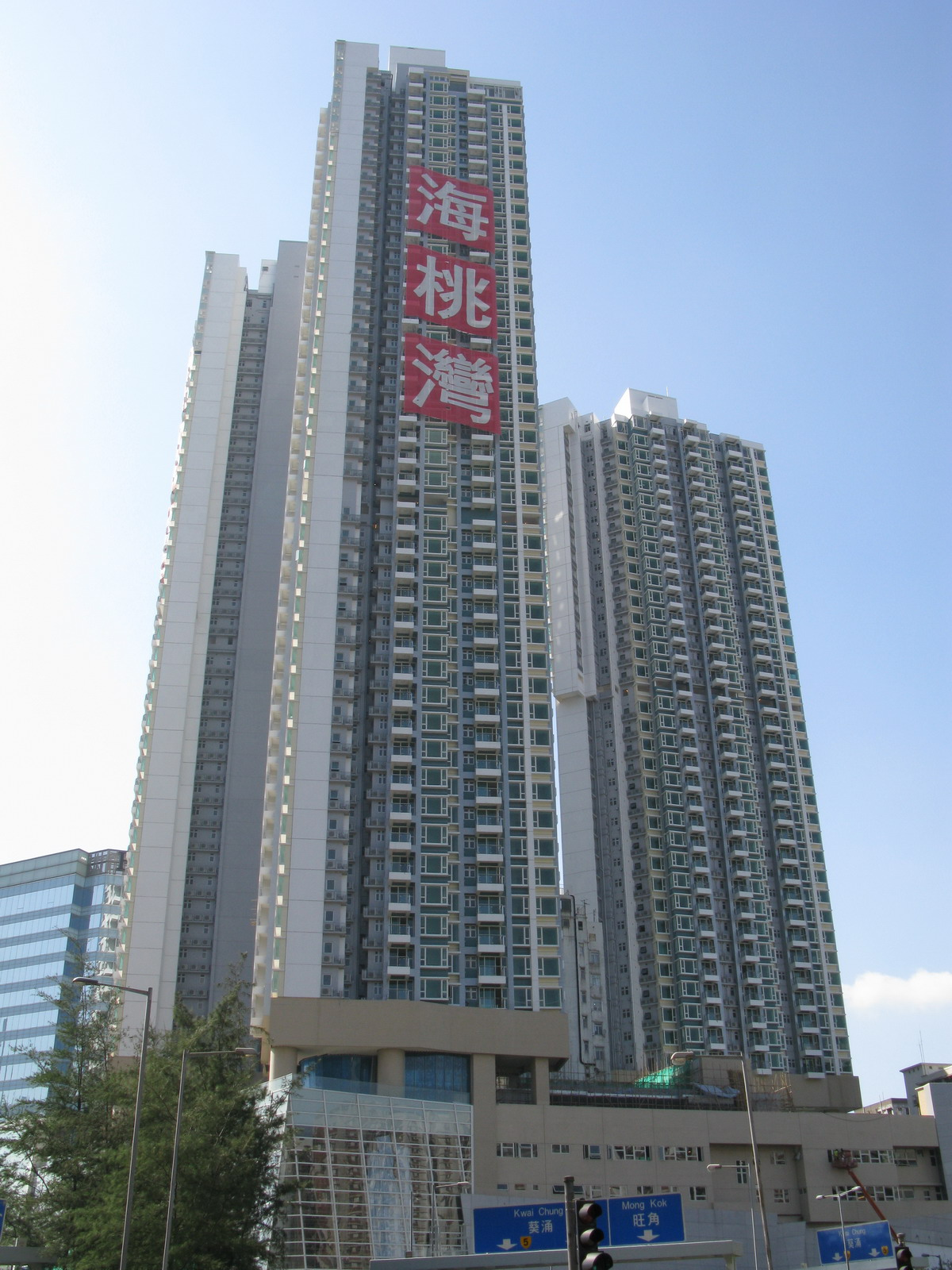
Florient Rise

Florient Rise (Chinese: 海桃灣; Jyutping: hoi2 tou4 waan1; formerly Cherry Street Project, 櫻桃街項目) is a private housing estate in Cherry Street, Tai Kok Tsui, Yau Tsim Mong District, Kowloon, Hong Kong near Olympic station. It was jointly developed by Nan Fung Group and Urban Renewal Authority (URA) in 2008 and completed the construction in May 2009. It comprises three blocks with a total of 522 units.

== History ==
The Cherry Street Project was among the first batch of redevelopment projects announced by the controversial Urban Renewal Authority (URA) following its 2001 establishment. The site was previously home to old mixed-use buildings. All former residents were evicted. The URA partners with private developers to carry out redevelopment projects. On 22 July 2004, the project was awarded to Nan Fung Development, who beat out eight other developers.

== Features ==
The estate has three residential blocks offering a total of 522 flats.

It also includes a children's-themed shopping centre called "West 9 Zone".

== Education ==
Florient Rise is in Primary One Admission (POA) School Net 32. Within the school net are multiple aided schools (operated independently but funded with government money) and Tong Mei Road Government Primary School (塘尾道官立小學).

== Hoi Ming Court incident ==
There is a residential block called "Hoi Ming Court" in the middle of the construction site of the Cherry Street Project, but Hoi Ming Court was excluded from the redevelopment project due to its young age. Nan Fung Development, one of the project's property developers, tried to acquire the block for the whole redevelopment. However, both Nan Fung and URA thought that the acquisition cost raised by flat owners was too high and finally gave up the acquisition plan. Hoi Ming Court was left in place and Florient Rise was built around Hoi Ming Court.
