= Fu Pak (constituency) =

Constituency in Hong Kong

- Elected constituency for the Yau Tsim Mong District Council
- Boundary of Fu Pak in Yau Tsim Mong District
- District: Yau Tsim Mong
- Legislative Council constituency: Kowloon West
- Population: 19,046 (2019)
- Electorate: 10,404 (2019)

Current constituency
- Created: 2003
- Number of members: One
- Member: vacant
- Created from: Charming, Mong Kok Central

Fu Pak (富柏) is a constituency in Hong Kong. It is one of the 20 constituencies in the Yau Tsim Mong District.

The constituency returns one district councillor to the Yau Tsim Mong District Council, with an election every four years. The seat is formerly held by Yu Tak-po of the Civic Party.

Fu Pak constituency is loosely based on the areas of the Hoi Fu Court, Park Avenue, Central Park and The Hermitage on the reclaimed land of old Yau Ma Tei Typhoon Shelter. with estimated population of 19,594.

== Councillors represented ==
Election	Member	Party
2003	Lai Chi-lap	Democratic
2007	Chan Wai-keung	Independent
2011	Chan Wai-keung	Independent
2015	Yu Tak-po→vacant	Civic
2019	Yu Tak-po→vacant	Civic→Independent

== Election results ==
=== 2010s ===
Yau Tsim Mong District Council Election, 2019: Fu Pak
Party	Candidate	Votes	%	±%
Civic	Yu Tak-po	4,748	62.54	+2.74
Independent	Chan Tak-lap	2,844	37.46	
Majority		1,904	5.08	
Turnout		7,632	73.36	
Civic hold		Swing		

Yau Tsim Mong District Council Election, 2015: Fu Pak
Party	Candidate	Votes	%	±%
Civic	Yu Tak-po	2,859	59.8	
Independent	Paul Law Siu-hung	1,924	40.2	
Majority		935	19.6	
Turnout		4,834	53.1	
Civic gain from Independent		Swing		

Yau Tsim Mong District Council Election, 2011: Fu Pak
Party	Candidate	Votes	%	±%
Independent	Chan Wai-keung	uncontested		
Independent hold		Swing		

=== 2000s ===
Yau Tsim Mong District Council Election, 2007: Fu Pak
Party	Candidate	Votes	%	±%
Independent	Chan Wai-keung	1,768	59.7	
ADPL	Szeto Pik-ki	379	14.0	
Independent gain from Democratic		Swing		

Yau Tsim Mong District Council Election, 2003: Fu Pak
Party	Candidate	Votes	%	±%
Democratic	Lai Chi-lap	1,455	53.8	
DAB	Yim Kwok-keung	573	21.2	
Independent	Wong Siu-man	298	11.0	
Democratic win (new seat)				
