= HSBC Centre =

Office building in Hong Kong

Coordinates: 22.31905°N 114.16096°E

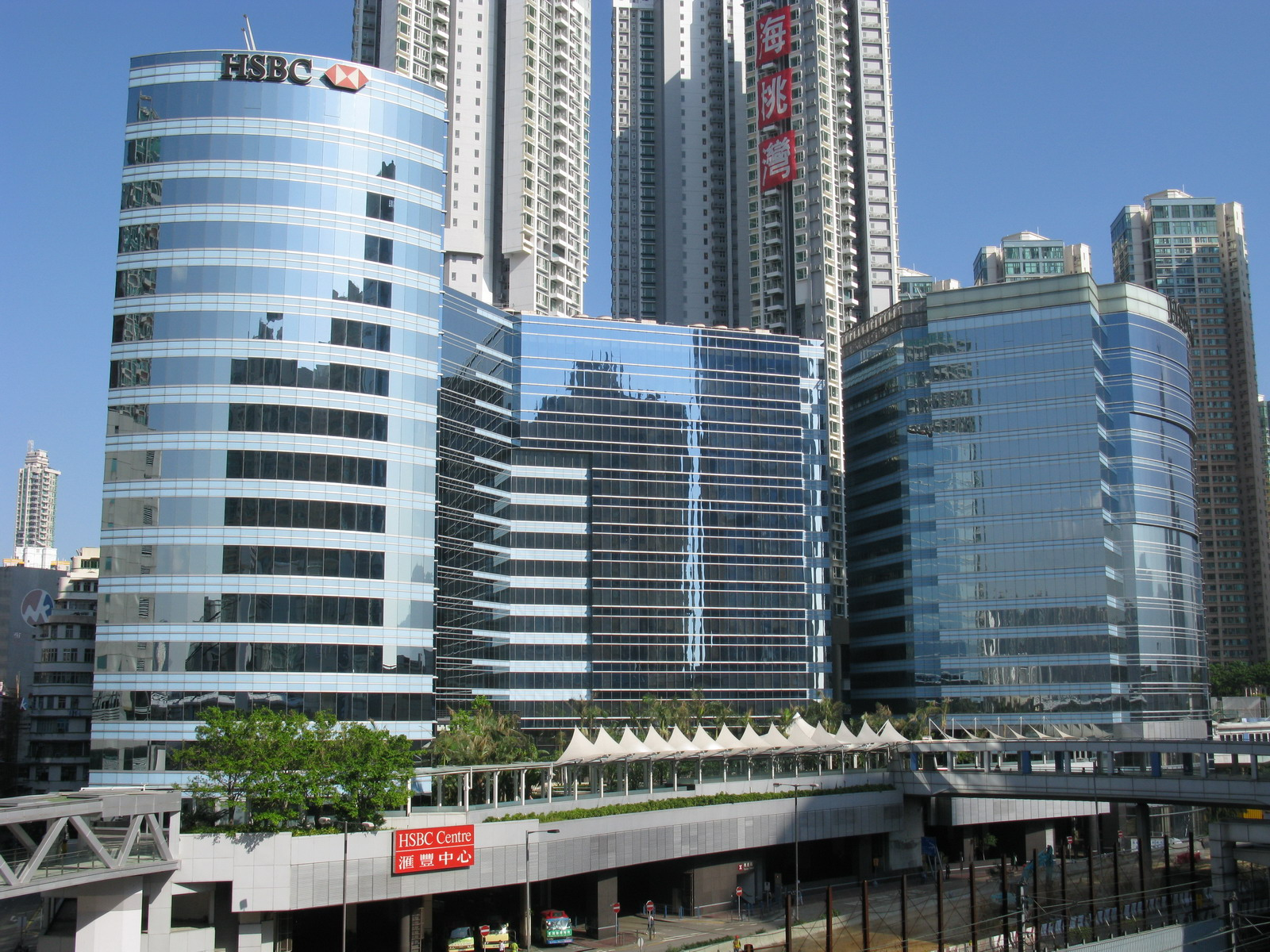
HSBC Centre

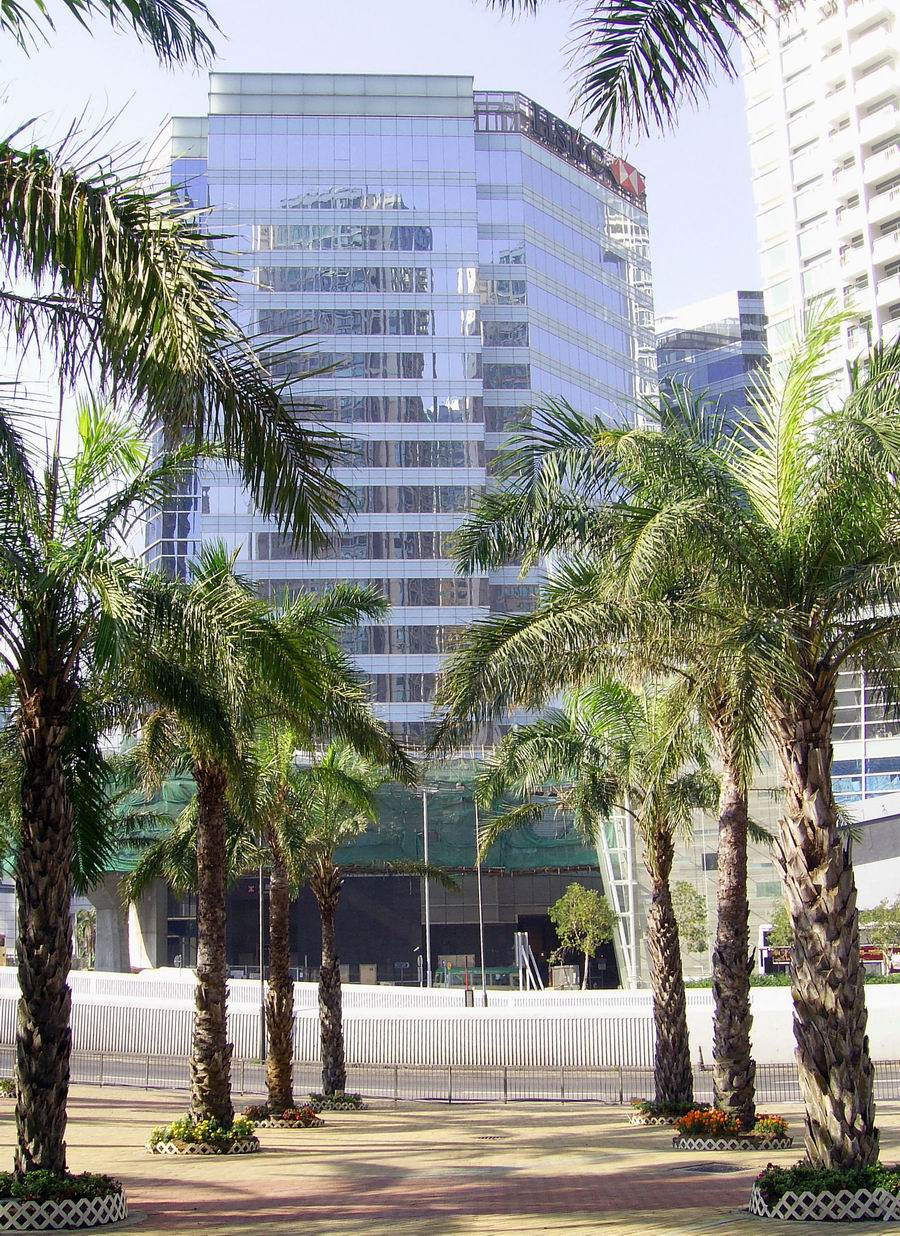
Tower 1, HSBC Centre

HSBC Centre (Chinese: 滙豐中心; Jyutping: wui6 fung1 zung1 sam1) is an office building of HSBC in Tai Kok Tsui, Kowloon, Hong Kong. It consists of a 14-storey and two twin connected 15-storey office towers resting on a 1-level podium with a public transport interchange and a 2-level basement carpark were built.

Formerly Tai Kok Tsui Ferry Pier Bus Terminus, the building was developed by Sino Land, New World Development, Kerry Properties, China Overseas Land and Investment and Capitaland Commercial Limited in 1998 during the development of Olympian City, and it was initially managed by Sino Land. Later, Sino sold the office part of the building to HSBC at HK$4 billion. Then HSBC's back office started there in 1999.

== Floor directory ==
- Ground Floor (G/F):
  - MTR Olympic station public transport interchange;
  - MTR Olympic station Exit B and C;
  - Building Lobby and main entrance.
- Upper Ground Floor (UG/F):
  - Office Lobbies of Tower 1, 2 & 3;
  - The Hongkong and Shanghai Banking Corporation HSBC Centre Branch
  - HSBC Express Banking Centre
  - Staff Canteen
  - Staff Only Pacific Coffee
  - Staff Medical Clinic
  - Wayfoong Sports Club (WSC) fitness centre
  - Wayfoong Nursery School
  - Footbridges to MTR Olympic station and Harbour Green
- 2/F to 18/F: Various Supporting Departments Offices of The Hongkong and Shanghai Banking Corporation

== Lion statues ==
For the celebration of the 150th anniversary of HSBC, a pair of lions were re-cast in 2015, modelling on the Hong Kong lions at the HSBC Main Building. They are placed at the lobby of HSBC Centre.
