= Cherry Street, Hong Kong =

Road in Tai Kok Tsui, Hong Kong

Coordinates: 22.3180°N 114.1616°E

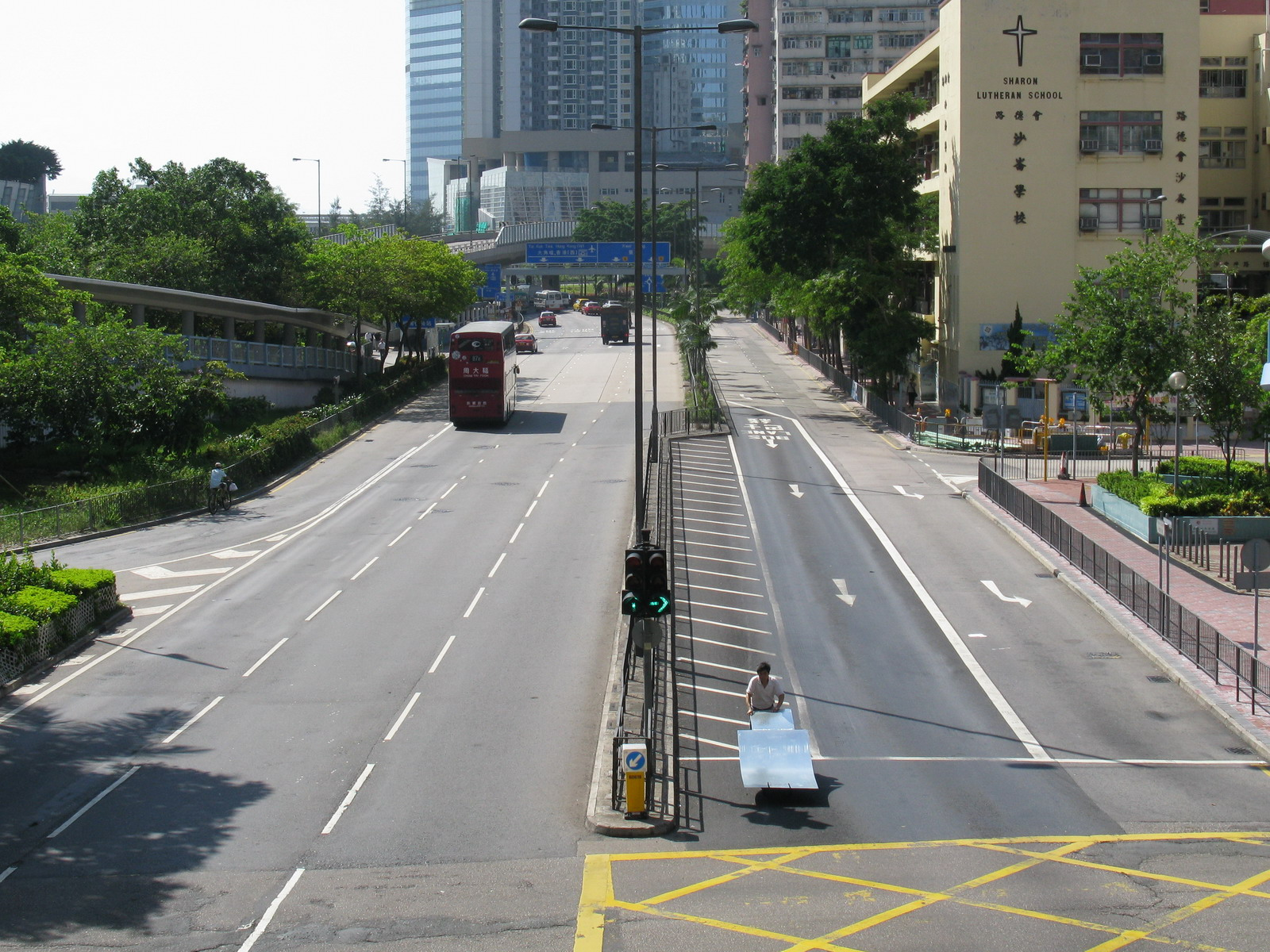
- Traditional Chinese: 櫻桃街
- Simplified Chinese: 樱桃街
Transcriptions
Standard Mandarin
- Hanyu Pinyin: Yīngtáo Jiē
Yue: Cantonese
- Yale Romanization: ying1 tou4 gaai1

Cherry Street (Chinese: 櫻桃街; Jyutping: jing1 tou4 gaai1) is a street in Tai Kok Tsui, Kowloon, Hong Kong. It was a street to Tai Kok Tsui Ferry Pier. After the reclamation of the West Kowloon in 1990s, it became a road across the new reclamation and a tunnel was built under the Olympic station.

The name of street, cherry, like other streets in Tai Kok Tsui, was named after different kinds of trees.

The construction shaft of the Guangzhou–Shenzhen–Hong Kong Express Rail Link is also located there.

== See also ==
- List of streets and roads in Hong Kong
