= Olympic station =

MTR station in Kowloon, Hong Kong

Olympic 奧運
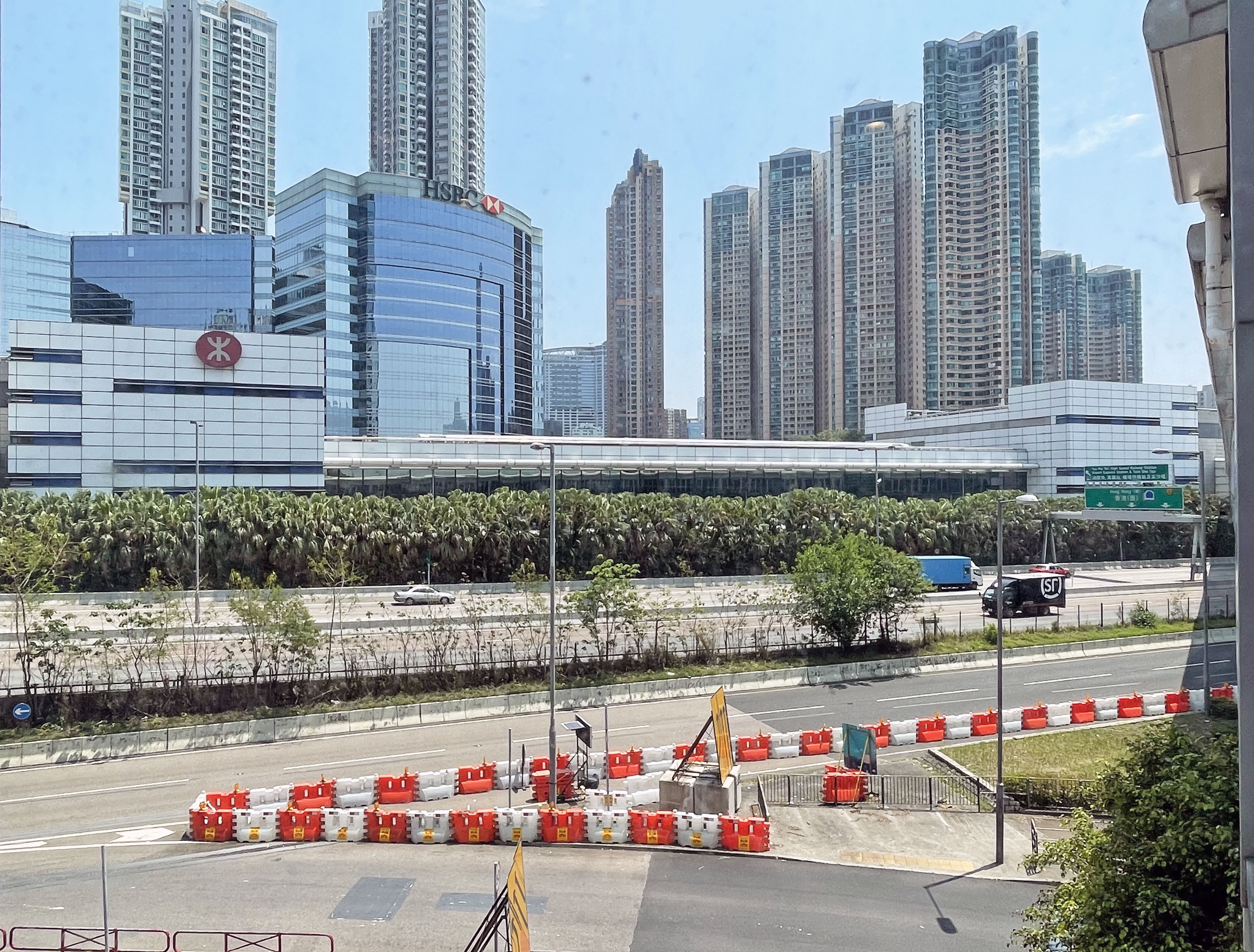
- Station exterior

Chinese name
- Traditional Chinese: 奧運
- Simplified Chinese: 奥运
- Cantonese Yale: Ouwahn
- Literal meaning: Olympics
Transcriptions
Standard Mandarin
- Hanyu Pinyin: Àoyùn
Yue: Cantonese
- Yale Romanization: Ouwahn
- Jyutping: Ou3wan6

General information
- Location: Lin Cheung Road × Cherry Street, Tai Kok Tsui; Yau Tsim Mong District, Hong Kong
- Coordinates: 22°19′04″N 114°09′37″E
- System: MTR rapid transit station
- Owner: MTR Corporation
- Operator: MTR Corporation
- Line: Tung Chung line
- Platforms: 2 side platforms
- Tracks: 4
- Connections: Bus, minibus

Construction
- Structure type: At-grade
- Platform levels: 1
- Accessible: Yes
- Architect: CYS Associates

Other information
- Station code: OLY

History
- Opened: 22 June 1998; 28 years ago
- Former names: Tai Kok Tsui

Services
| Preceding station | MTR | Following station |
|---|---|---|
| Kowloon towards Hong Kong | Tung Chung line | Nam Cheong towards Tung Chung |
Airport Express does not stop here
Route map
Location
- Location within MTR Location within Hong Kong urban core

Olympic (Chinese: 奧運; Cantonese Yale: Ouwahn) is a station on the Tung Chung line of Hong Kong's MTR. The station's livery is dodger blue.

The station was originally named Tai Kok Tsui in proposals outlined by the government in the Airport Core Programme during the 1990s. In 1996, however, when Lee Lai-shan won the first ever Olympic gold medal of Hong Kong in windsurfing at the Atlanta 1996 Summer Olympics and two Hong Kong sportsmen, Cheung Yiu-cheung and Chiu Chung-lun, also won Gold medals in the Paralympic Games of the same year, the (then-under construction) station was renamed Olympic on 16 December 1996, paying tribute to those achievements of Hong Kong athletes. The station is decorated with pictures of the 1996 Summer Olympics and is named after the Olympic Games.

Olympic is only one of two stations on the Tung Chung line not shared with another line, the other being Tung Chung itself.

== History ==
The construction contract for the station was awarded to the Laing-Hip Hing joint venture in November 1994.

The station was opened on 22 June 1998 along with the rest of the Tung Chung line.

== Station layout ==
Both side platforms are parallel to each other and are at ground level. They do not share the same island platform due to the Airport Express trains that run through the station without stopping.

| U2 | Concourse | Exits, customer service, MTRshops, Hang Seng Bank |
| U2 | Concourse | Vending machines, automatic teller machines |
| G | Ground level | Exit A1, Island Harbourview Bus Terminus |
| G | Street level | Lin Cheung Road, West Kowloon Highway |
| G | Platform 1 | Tung Chung line towards Tung Chung (Nam Cheong) → |
| G | Side platform, doors will open on the right |
| G | Airport Express | Airport Express does not stop here → |
| G | Airport Express | ← Airport Express does not stop here |
| G | Side platform, doors will open on the right |
| G | Platform 2 | ← Tung Chung line towards Hong Kong (Kowloon) |
| G | Street level | Lin Cheung Road, Sham Mong Road |
| G | Exits | Exit B, C1, C2, Olympic Station Bus Terminus |

== Entrances and exits ==
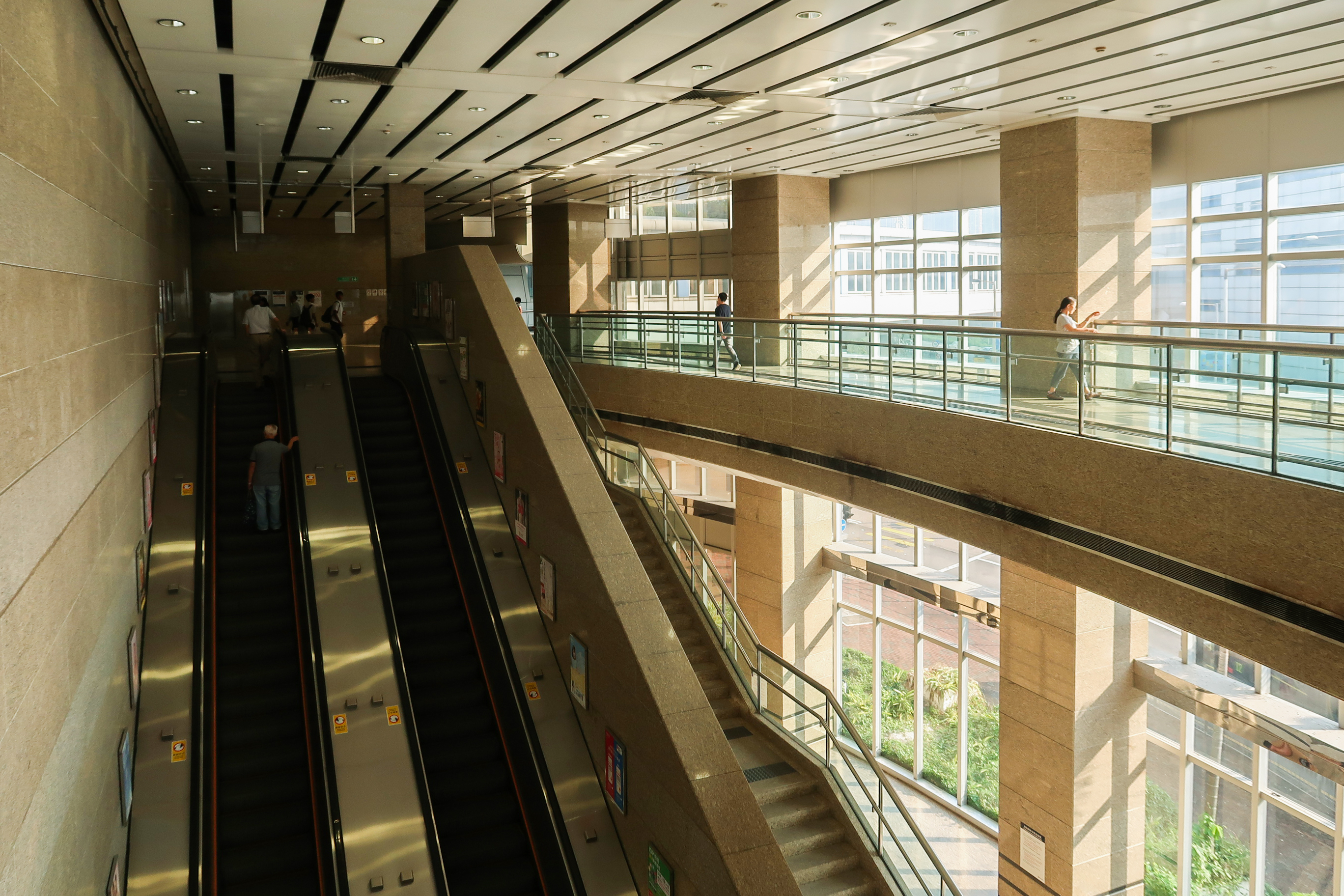
Exit C

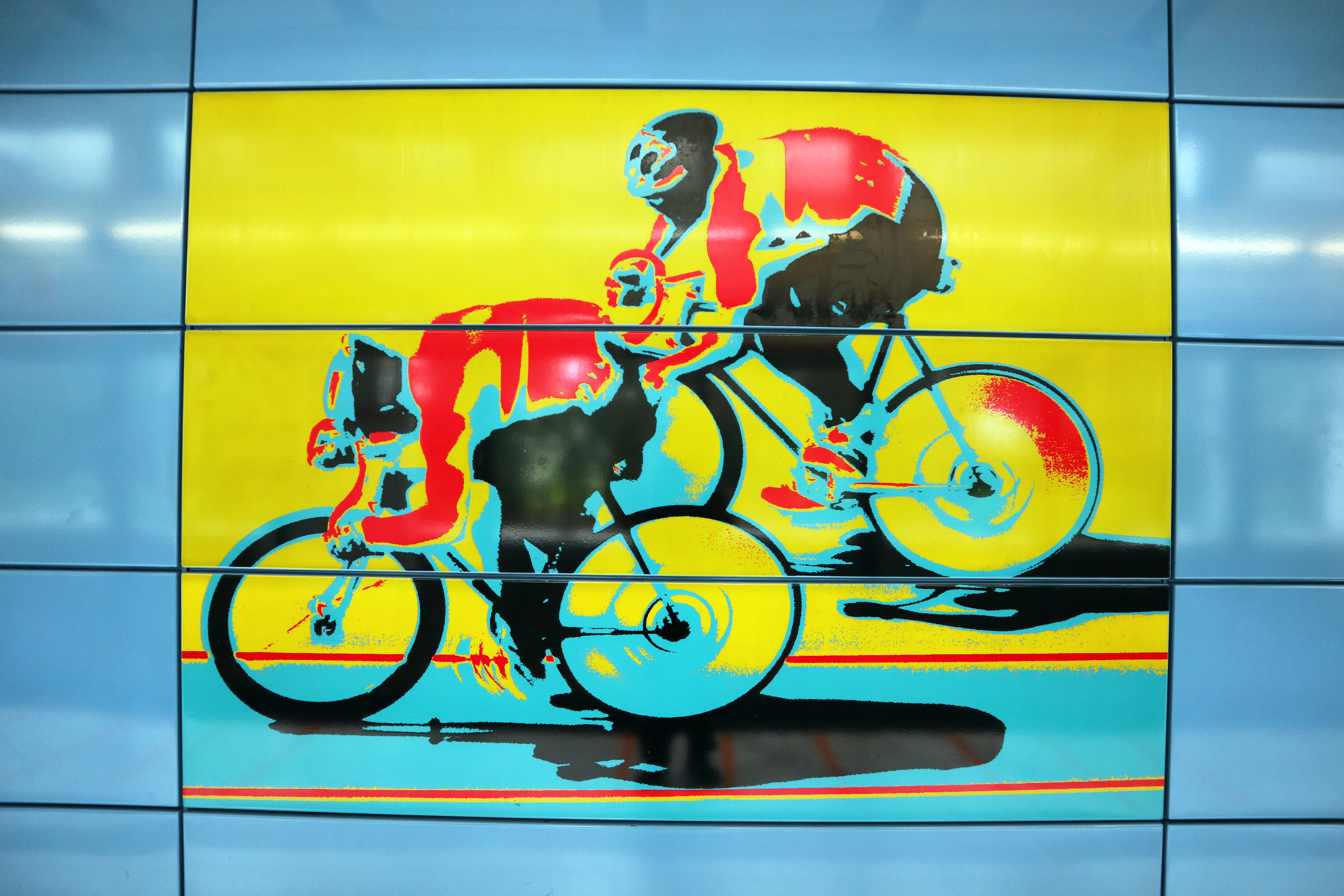
Platforms in Sport Cycling

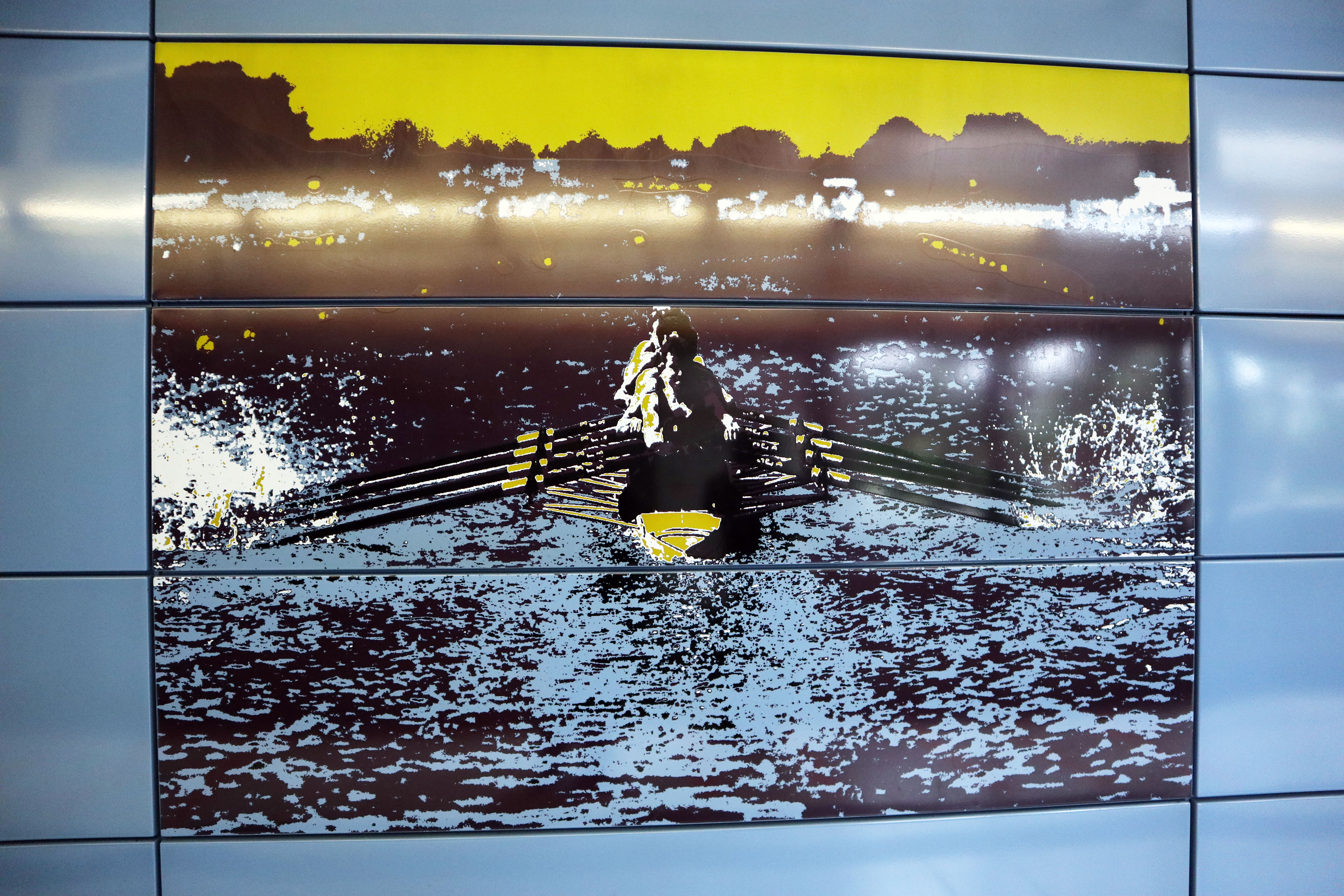
MTR Olympic Station Platform Arts in the Sport Rowing

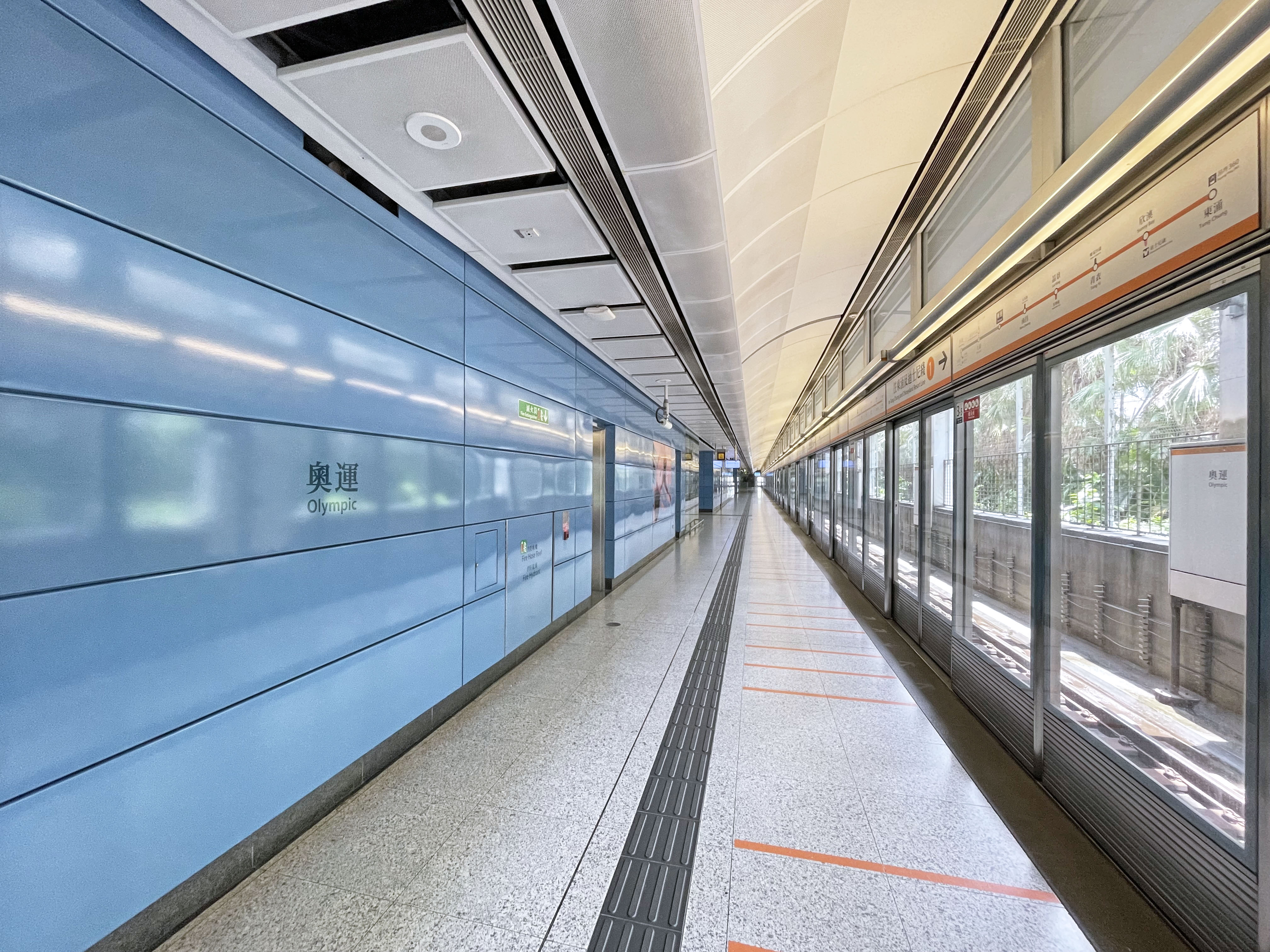
Platform 1

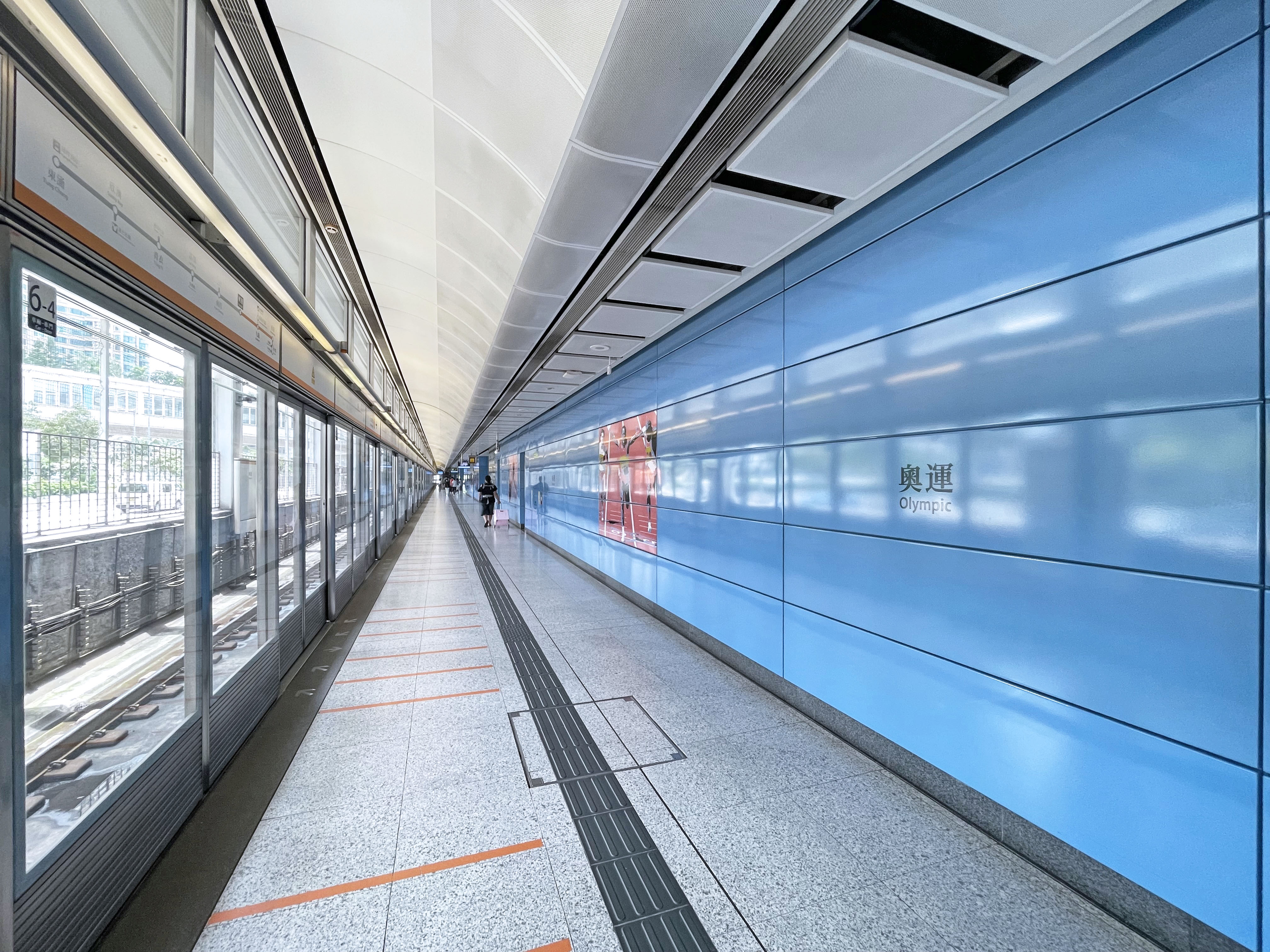
Platform 2

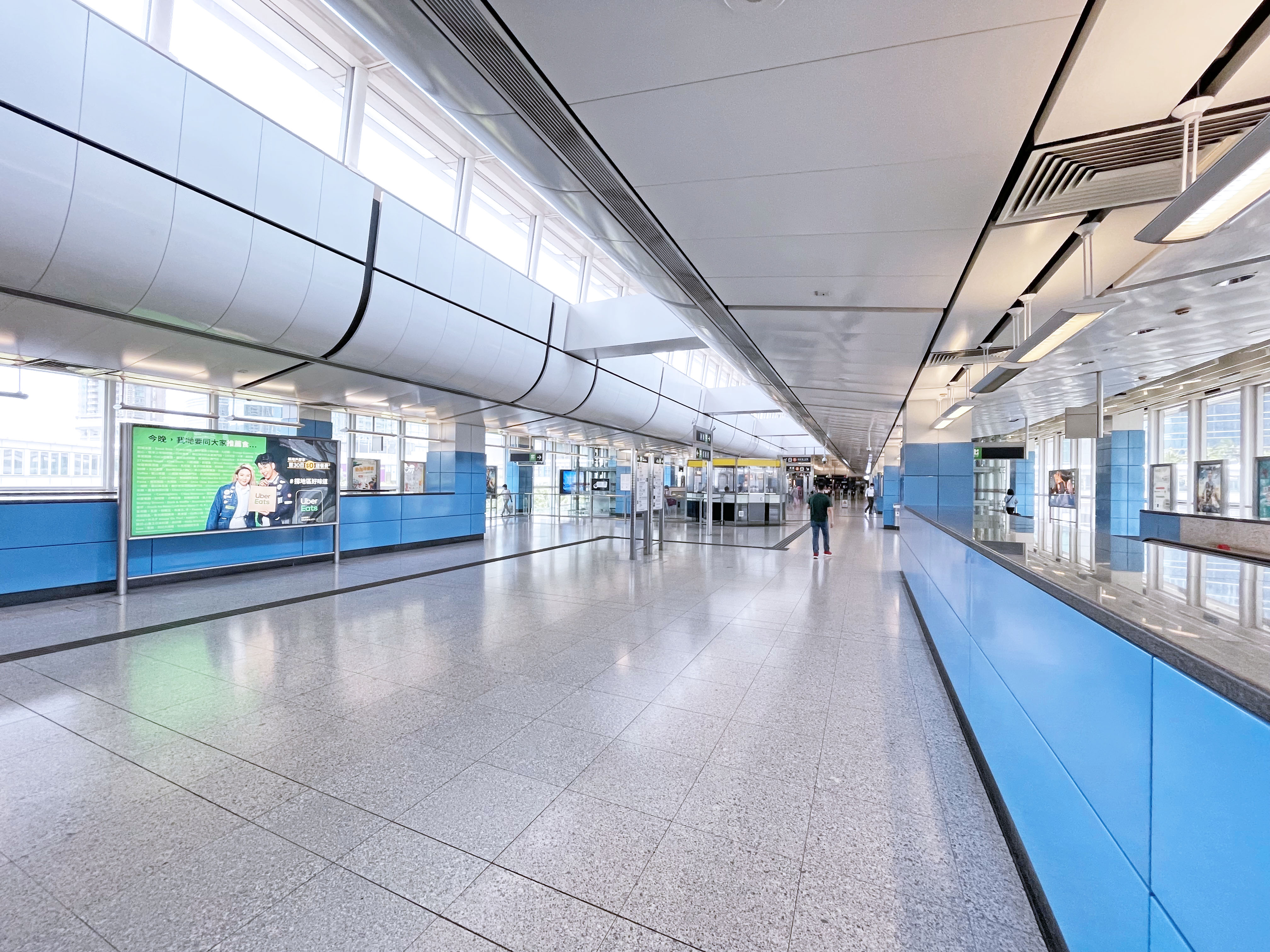
Concourse (paid area)

The station's exits are all connected via pedestrian footbridges, with none directly built into the station. Some of these footbridges run over the West Kowloon Highway and Lin Cheung Road.

- A1: Island Harbourview Bus Terminus
- A2: Island Harbourview, Olympian City 1
- B: HSBC Centre Towers 2 and 3
- C1: Sham Mong Road
- C2: Cherry Street
- C3: HSBC Centre Towers 2 and 3
- C4: HSBC Centre Tower 1
- C5: Florient Rise
- D1: Cherry Street
- D2: Lin Cheung Road
- D3: Olympian City 2 and 3
- E: Bank of China Centre, Olympian City 1, The Long Beach, Hampton Place
