= Park Avenue, Central Park (Hong Kong) =

Housing estate in Tai Kok Tsui, Kowloon, Hong Kong

Coordinates: 22.3163°N 114.1625°E

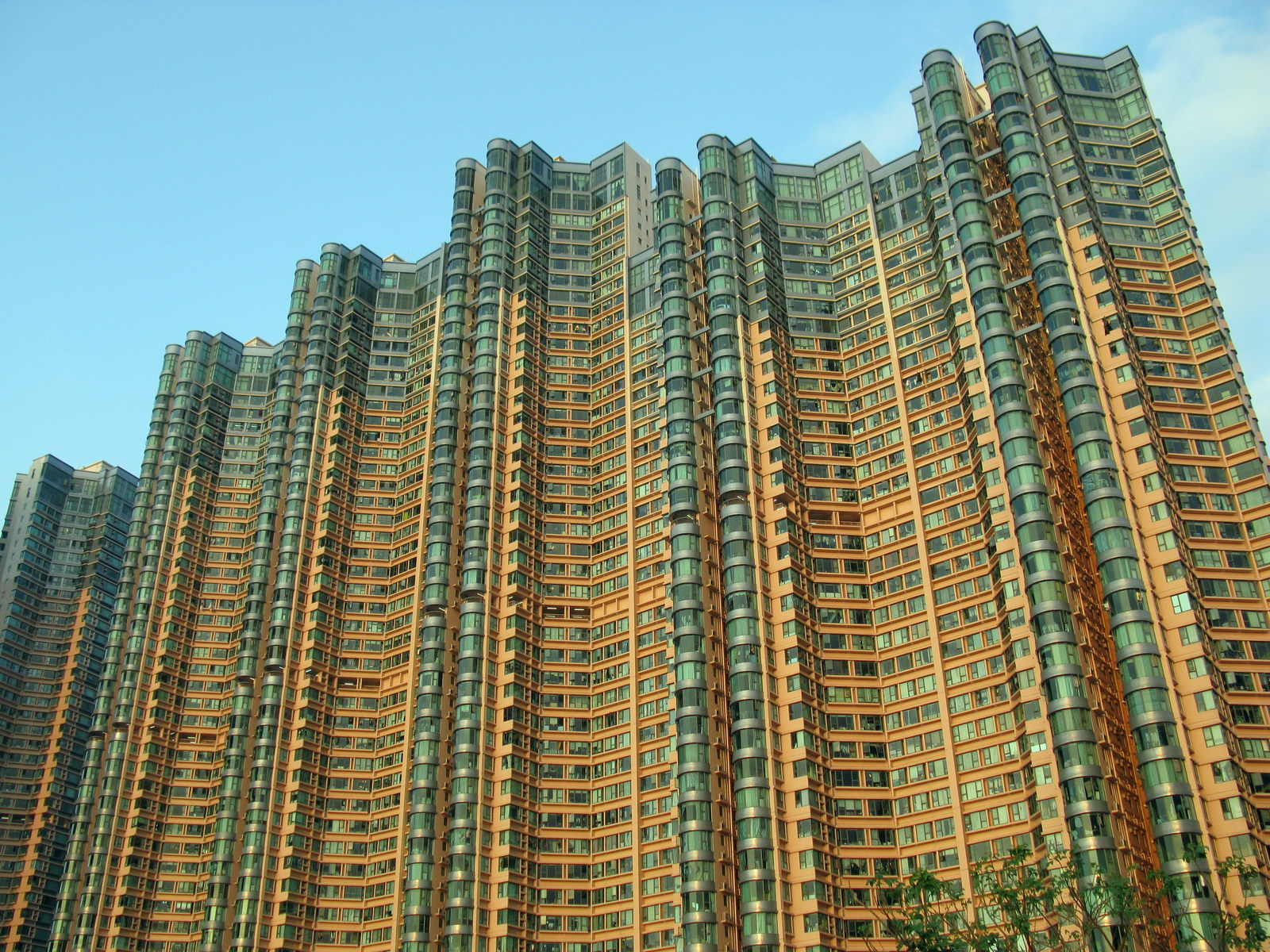
Park Avenue

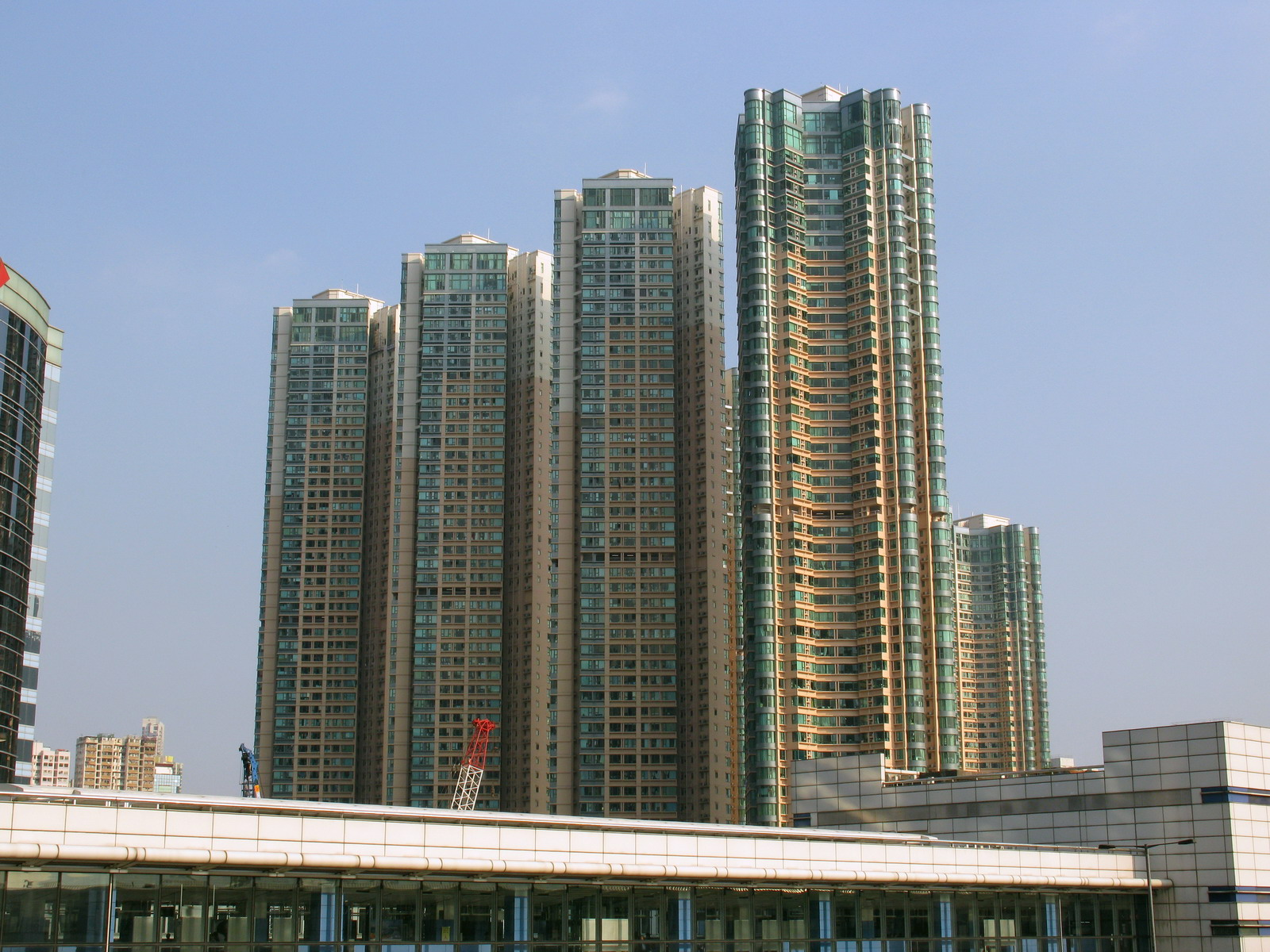
Central Park

Park Avenue (Chinese: 柏景灣; Jyutping: baak3 ging2 waan1) and Central Park (Chinese: 帝柏海灣; Jyutping: dai3 paak3 hoi2 waan1) is a private housing estate in Tai Kok Tsui, Kowloon, Hong Kong. It was one of the projects connected with the MTR Olympic station Phase II development and is built on the reclaimed land of the former Yau Ma Tei Typhoon Shelter. Developed by the consortium of MTR Corporation, Sino Land, Kerry Properties, Bank of China (Hong Kong) and China Overseas Land and Investment in 2001, it comprises nine high-rise buildings (Central Park: Block 1, 2, 3 and 5 ; Park Avenue: Block 6, 7, 8, 9 and 10) with a total of 2,396 units (Park Avenue: 1,592 ; Central Park: 1,344).
