= Island Harbourview =

Housing estate in Tai Kok Tsui, Hong Kong

Coordinates: 22.3189°N 114.1575°E

- Traditional Chinese: 維港灣
- Simplified Chinese: 维港湾
Transcriptions
Standard Mandarin
- Hanyu Pinyin: Wéi Gǎngwān
Yue: Cantonese
- Jyutping: wai^{4}gong^{2}waan^{1}

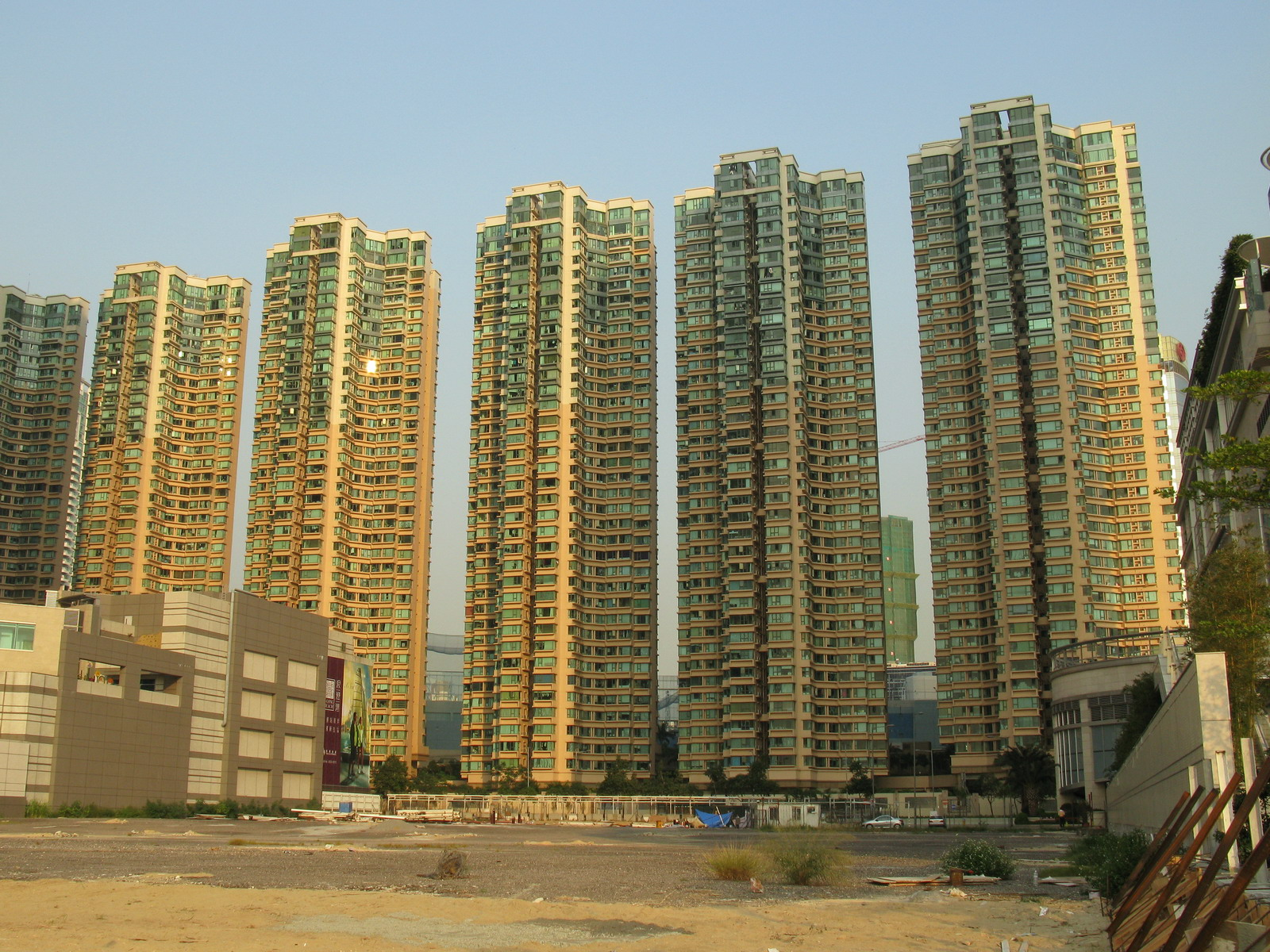
Block 1 to 7, Island Harbourview from left to right)

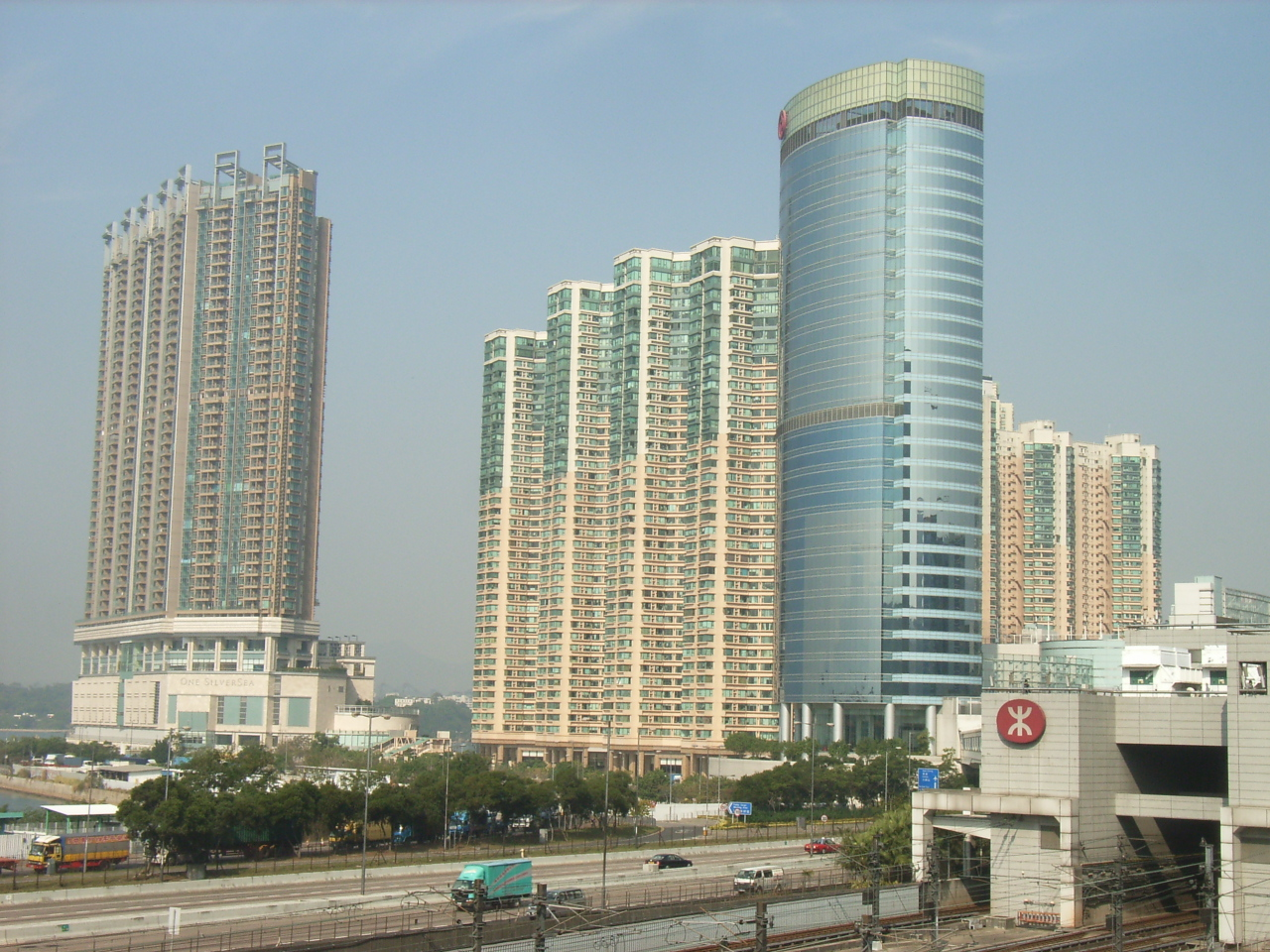
From left to right: One Silver Sea, Island Harbourview, Bank of China Centre, Olympic station.

Island Harbourview (Chinese: 維港灣; Jyutping: wai^{4}gong^{2}waan^{1}) is one of the largest private housing estates in Tai Kok Tsui, Yau Tsim Mong District, Kowloon, Hong Kong. It is one of the property projects in MTR Olympic station Phase I. Developed by MTR Corporation, Sino Land, Bank of China (Hong Kong), Kerry Properties and Capitaland Commercial Limited, it comprises nine high-rise buildings, which were completed in 1998 and 1999. The towers are numbered from one to ten, but there is no tower four due to local superstition.

Flats in the development range in size from 609 to 1,215 square feet (56.6 to 112.9 m^{2}). It is the first estate to be completed in the new Reclamation Area which was part of the 1997 Construction Project.

== Demographics ==
According to the 2016 by-census, Island Harbourview had a population of 6,549. The median age was 42.6 and the majority of residents (85.9 per cent) were of Chinese ethnicity. The average household size was 2.9 people. The median monthly household income of all households (i.e. including both economically active and inactive households) was HK$90,000.

== Politics ==
Island Harbourview is located in Olympic constituency of the Yau Tsim Mong District Council. It is currently represented by James To Kun-sun, who was elected in the 2019 elections.

== Education ==
Island Harbourview is in Primary One Admission (POA) School Net 32. Within the school net are multiple aided schools (operated independently but funded with government money) and Tong Mei Road Government Primary School (塘尾道官立小學).
