= Bank of China Centre =

Office building in Hong Kong

Coordinates: 22.31812°N 114.15876°E

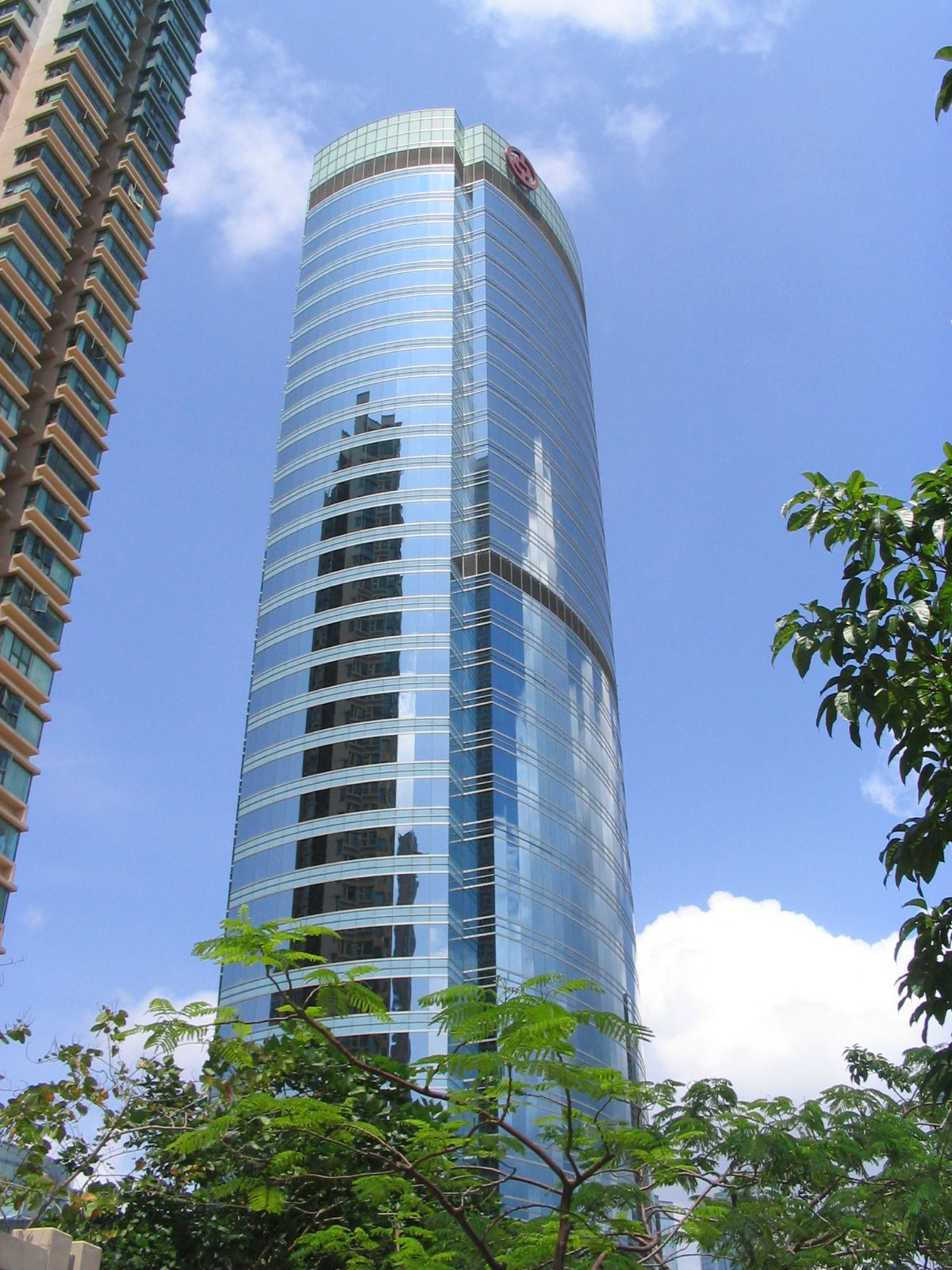
Bank of China Centre

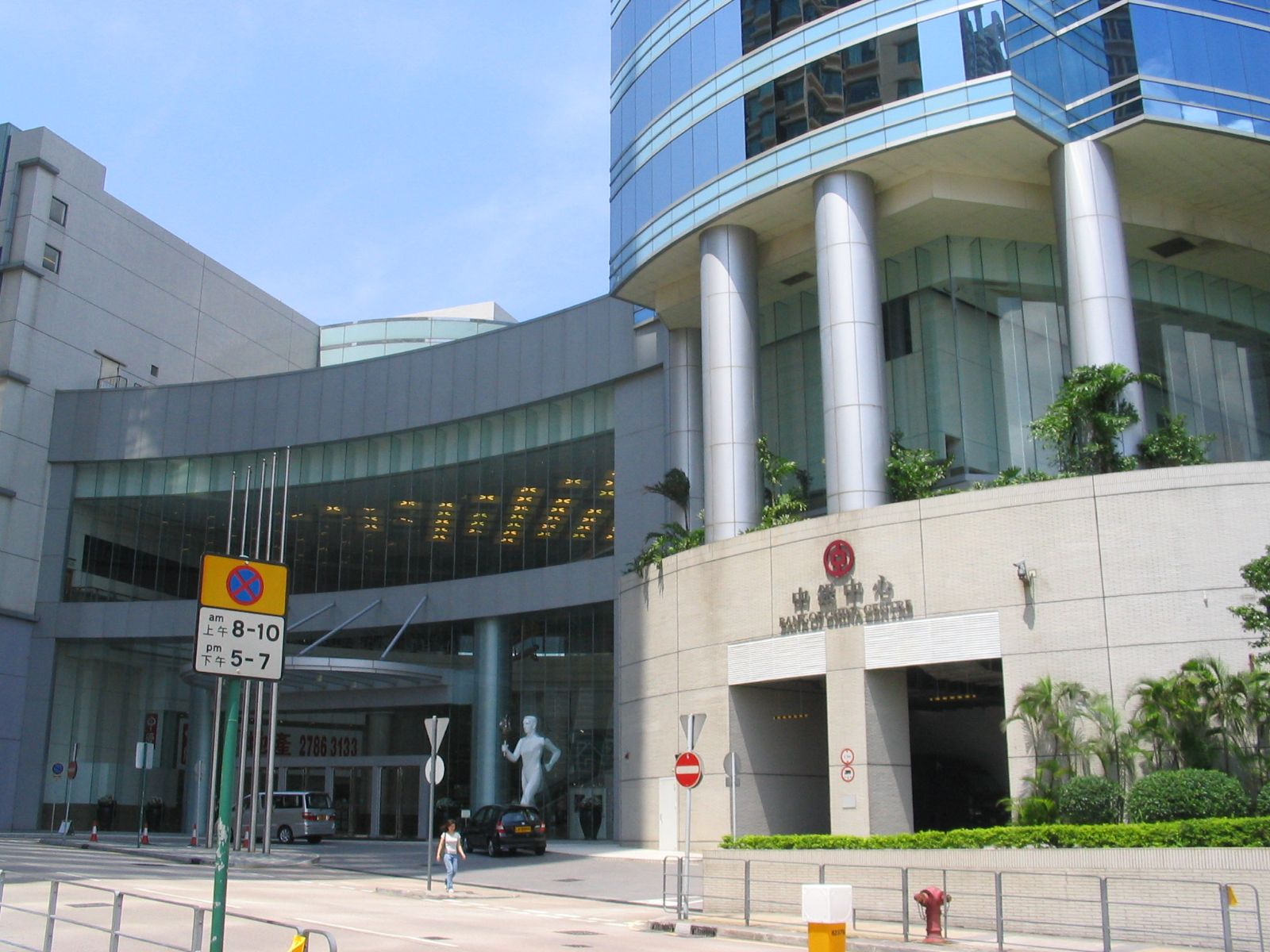
Entrance of Bank of China Centre

Bank of China Centre (Chinese: 中銀中心; Jyutping: zung1 ngan2 zung1 sam1), or BOC Centre, is a 26-storey office building of Bank of China (Hong Kong) in Tai Kok Tsui, Kowloon, Hong Kong near Olympic station. It was developed by Sino Land, Bank of China (Hong Kong), Kerry Properties, China Overseas Land and Investment and Capitaland Commercial Limited in 2000, and it was initially managed by Sino Land, but sold to BOC (Hong Kong) at HK$1.6 billion for the back office operations in 2001.
