= Victoria Harbour crossings =

This article is a list of transport means that cross Victoria Harbour in Hong Kong.

== Ferry routes ==
Coral Sea Ferry

- Sai Wan Ho - Kwun Tong
- Sai Wan Ho - Sam Ka Tsuen

Fortune Ferry

- Central - Hung Hom
- North Point - Kwun Tong

Star Ferry

- Central - Tsim Sha Tsui
- Wan Chai - Tsim Sha Tsui

Sun Ferry

- North Point - Hung Hom
- North Point - Kowloon City

== Road tunnels ==
- Vehicular harbour crossings in Hong Kong
  - Cross-Harbour Tunnel (opened 1972)
  - Eastern Harbour Crossing (opened 1989)
  - Western Harbour Crossing (opened 1997)

== MTR ==
- Tsuen Wan line - between Tsim Sha Tsui and Admiralty stations (opened 1980)
- Eastern Harbour Crossing - Tseung Kwan O line - between Yau Tong and Quarry Bay stations (opened 1989 as part of Kwun Tong line between Lam Tin and Quarry Bay)
- Immersed tube tunnel carrying Tung Chung line and Airport Express of MTR - between Hong Kong and Kowloon stations (opened 1998)
- Sha Tin to Central Link (cross-harbour section) (Contract 1121) - East Rail - between Hung Hom and Exhibition Centre stations (opened in 2022)

== Water supply ==
Several supply tunnels across the harbour, e.g., one which lands in Admiralty.

== Sewerage ==
- Harbour Area Treatment Scheme (HATS, previously known as Strategic Sewage Disposal Scheme (SSDS)) - 23.6 km-long system of tunnels deep underground from Kowloon and northeastern part of Hong Kong Island to Stonecutter's Island

== Power cable ==
- A 720-MVA cross-harbour link between Hongkong Electric's and CLP Power's grids.

== See also ==
- Transport in Hong Kong
- List of tunnels and bridges in Hong Kong
