= Tsuen Wan line immersed tube =

Railway tunnel crossing Victoria Harbour, Hong Kong

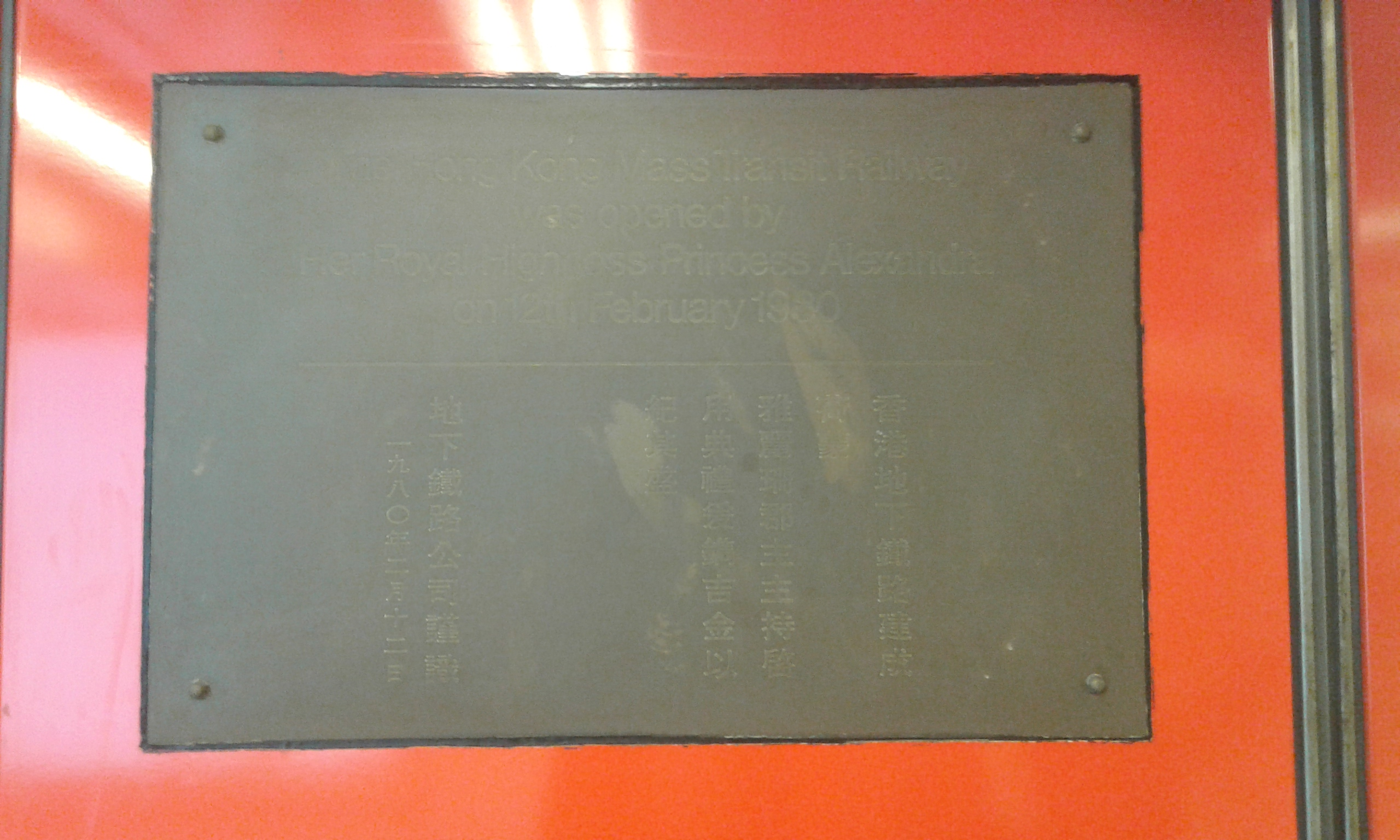
- Plaque commemorating the February 1980 opening of the full Modified Initial System
- Interactive map of Tsuen Wan line immersed tube

Overview
- Coordinates: 22.2878°N 114.1721°E
- Status: Active
- System: Tsuen Wan line (MTR)
- Crosses: Victoria Harbour
- Start: Tsim Sha Tsui
- End: Admiralty

Operation
- Constructed: Kumagai Gumi
- Opened: 12 February 1980; 46 years ago
- Owner: MTR Corporation
- Operator: MTR Corporation
- Traffic: Rail

Technical
- Design engineer: Per Hall Consultants
- Length: 1.4 km (0.87 mi)
- No. of tracks: Double
- Track gauge: 1,432 mm (4 ft 8 3/8 in)
- Electrified: 1.5 kV DC

The Tsuen Wan line of Hong Kong's Mass Transit Railway (MTR) system includes a 1.4-kilometre (1,500 yd) dual-tracked, reinforced concrete, immersed tube railway tunnel across Victoria Harbour, connecting Hong Kong Island to Kowloon.

== History ==
First proposed as early as 1967 in a study commissioned by the Hong Kong government in 1966, it was the first railway tunnel to cross the Victoria Harbour and also the first subsea railway tunnel in the territory. It was the second fixed crossing to cross the harbour, after the vehicular Cross Harbour Tunnel opened in 1972. The stations at the south and north ends of the tunnel are, respectively, Admiralty and Tsim Sha Tsui.

Its construction by Kumagai Gumi commenced in 1976. The 14 tunnel segments, each 100 metres long, were cast in a basin in Chai Wan. The tunnel was designed by Per Hall Consultants under the supervision of Freeman Fox and Partners. A specially designed barge, constructed for Kumagai Gumi by Mitsubishi Heavy Industries, arrived in Hong Kong in February 1977 to help form the seabed alignment and thereafter lay the tunnel segments into place.

The structural completion of the tunnel was marked on 26 March 1979 by a celebratory walk-through and breaking-open of a barrel of sake.

Upon its opening in 1980, the tunnel was part of the Modified Initial System of the territory's MTR. The full Modified Initial System was opened on 12 February 1980 by Princess Alexandra. She also rode the inaugural train through the immersed tube beneath Victoria Harbour to Chater station, which was renamed Central station in 1985. In 1982 the tunnel became part of the network's Tsuen Wan line.

== See also ==
- Victoria Harbour crossings § MTR
- List of tunnels in Hong Kong § Railway tunnels
- 1980s in Hong Kong
