= Kowloon City Ferry Pier =

Pier in Kowloon, Hong Kong

Coordinates: 22.317813°N 114.194351°E

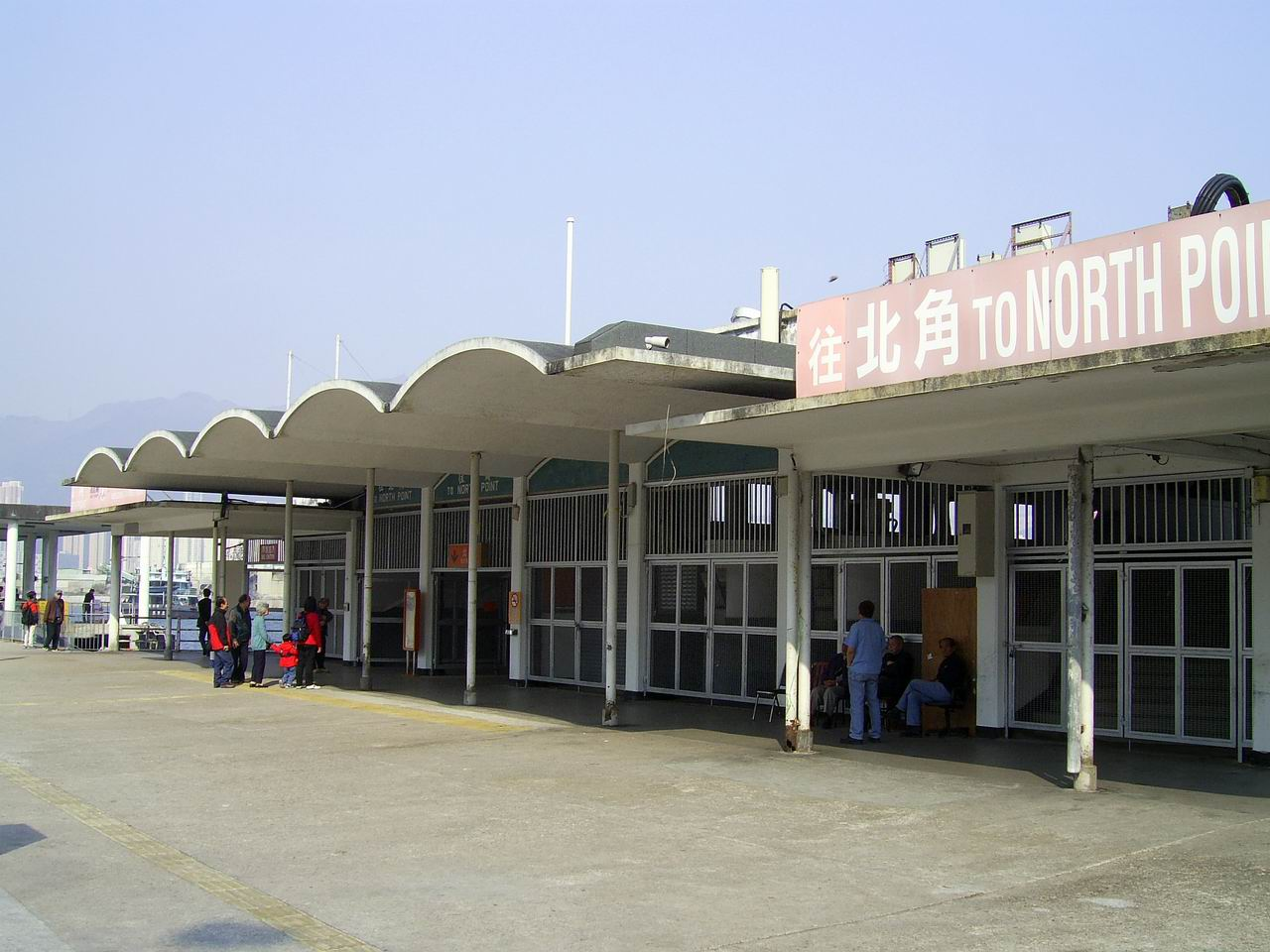
There is only one ferry route to North Point in Kowloon City Ferry Pier

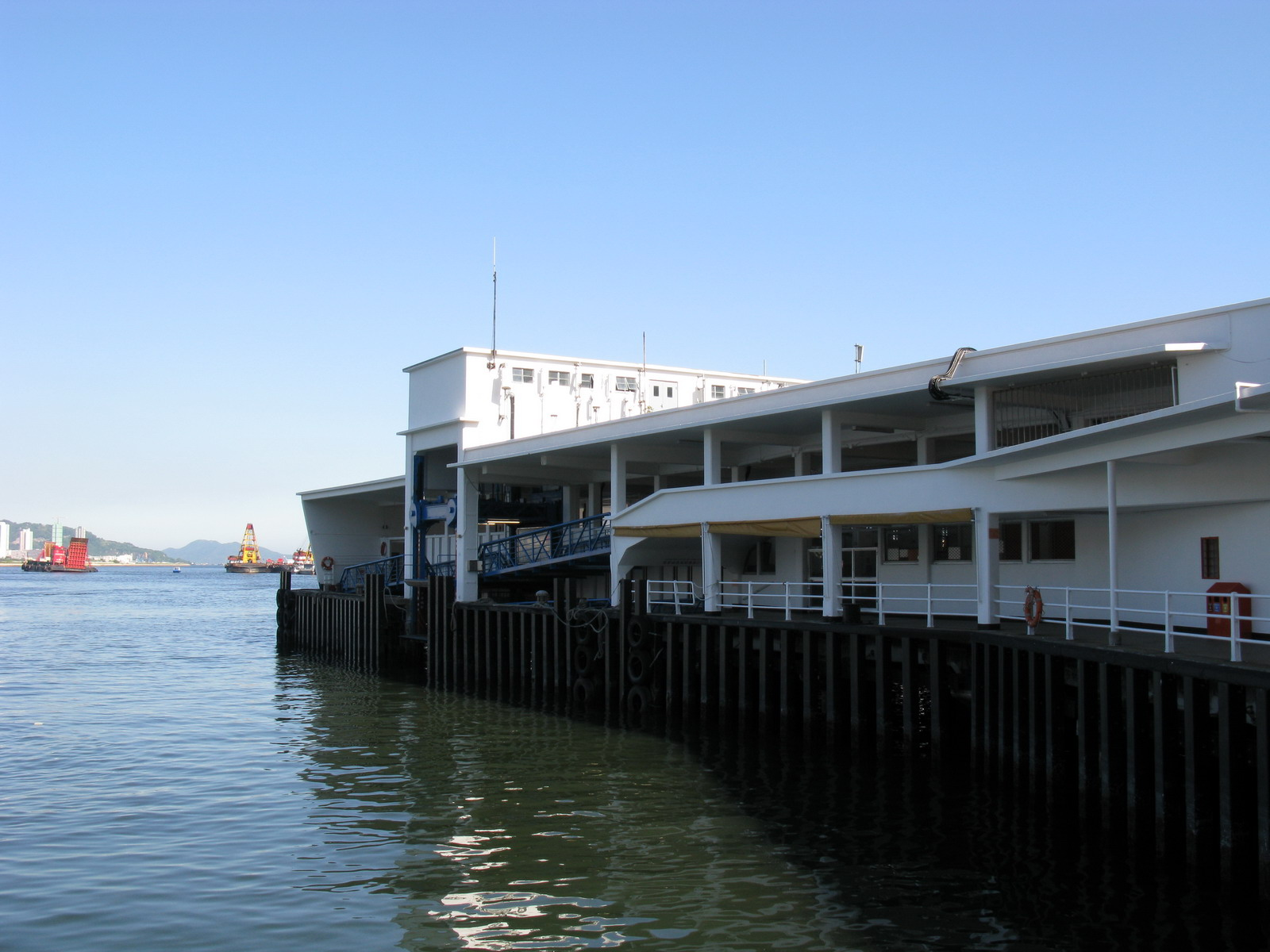
Kowloon City Ferry Pier

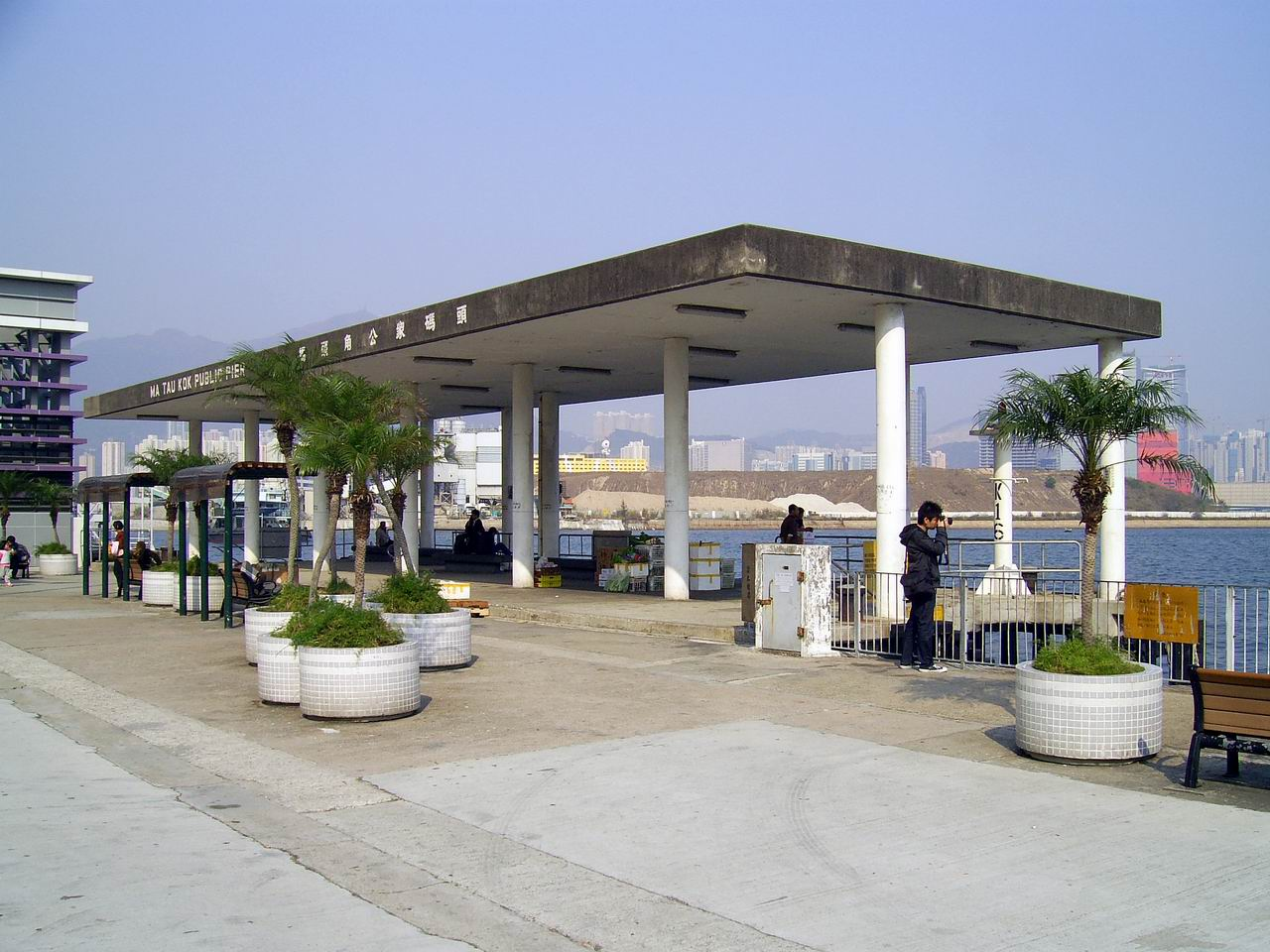
The neighbouring Ma Tau Kok Public Pier

Kowloon City Ferry Pier (Chinese: 九龍城碼頭) is a ferry pier in Ma Tau Kok, Kowloon, Hong Kong. It is at the north of Hoi Sham Park and the east of East Kowloon Corridor.

== History ==
The pier started operation in 1956 and was the first permanent pier in Hong Kong built after World War II. It had ferry services to Wan Chai, North Point and Tai Koo Shing (later Sai Wan Ho) and a vehicular ferry service to North Point (ceased operation in 1998).

== Current transportation ==
The pier currently has only one ferry service, to North Point, operated by New World First Ferry. There is a bus terminus outside the pier.
