= Sai Wan Ho Ferry Pier =

Coordinates: 22.2863°N 114.2241°E

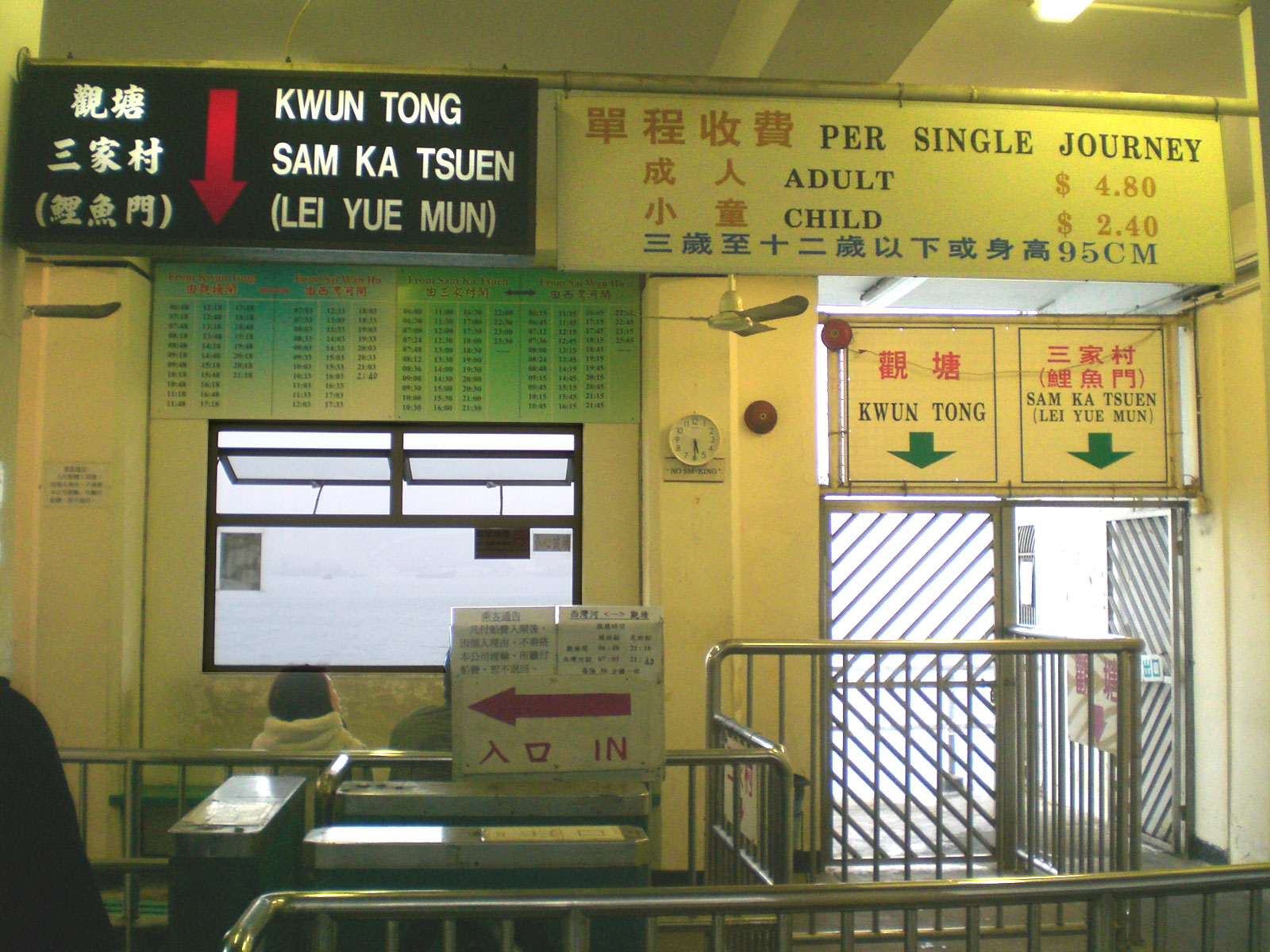
Sai Wan Ho Ferry Pier in February 2009

Sai Wan Ho Ferry Pier (Chinese: 西灣河碼頭) is a ferry pier near Lei King Wan (鯉景灣) in Sai Wan Ho, Hong Kong. It is near a bus terminus on the Grand Promenade (嘉亨灣). It has three ferry services to Kwun Tong, Sam Ka Tsuen and Tung Lung Chau. All ferry services are operated by Coral Sea Ferry.

The pier started operation in 1983, replacing the temporary Tai Koo Shing Ferry Pier.

== Destinations ==
| Destination; English | Terminal Name; English (Chinese) |
| Kwun Tong | Kwun Tong Ferry Pier (觀塘碼頭) |
| Sam Ka Tsuen | Sam Ka Tsuen Ferry Pier (三家村碼頭) |
| Tung Lung Chau | Tung Lung Chau Public Pier (東龍島公眾碼頭) |
