= Manulife Financial Centre =

Building in Hong Kong, China

Coordinates: 22°18′28″N 114°13′25″E

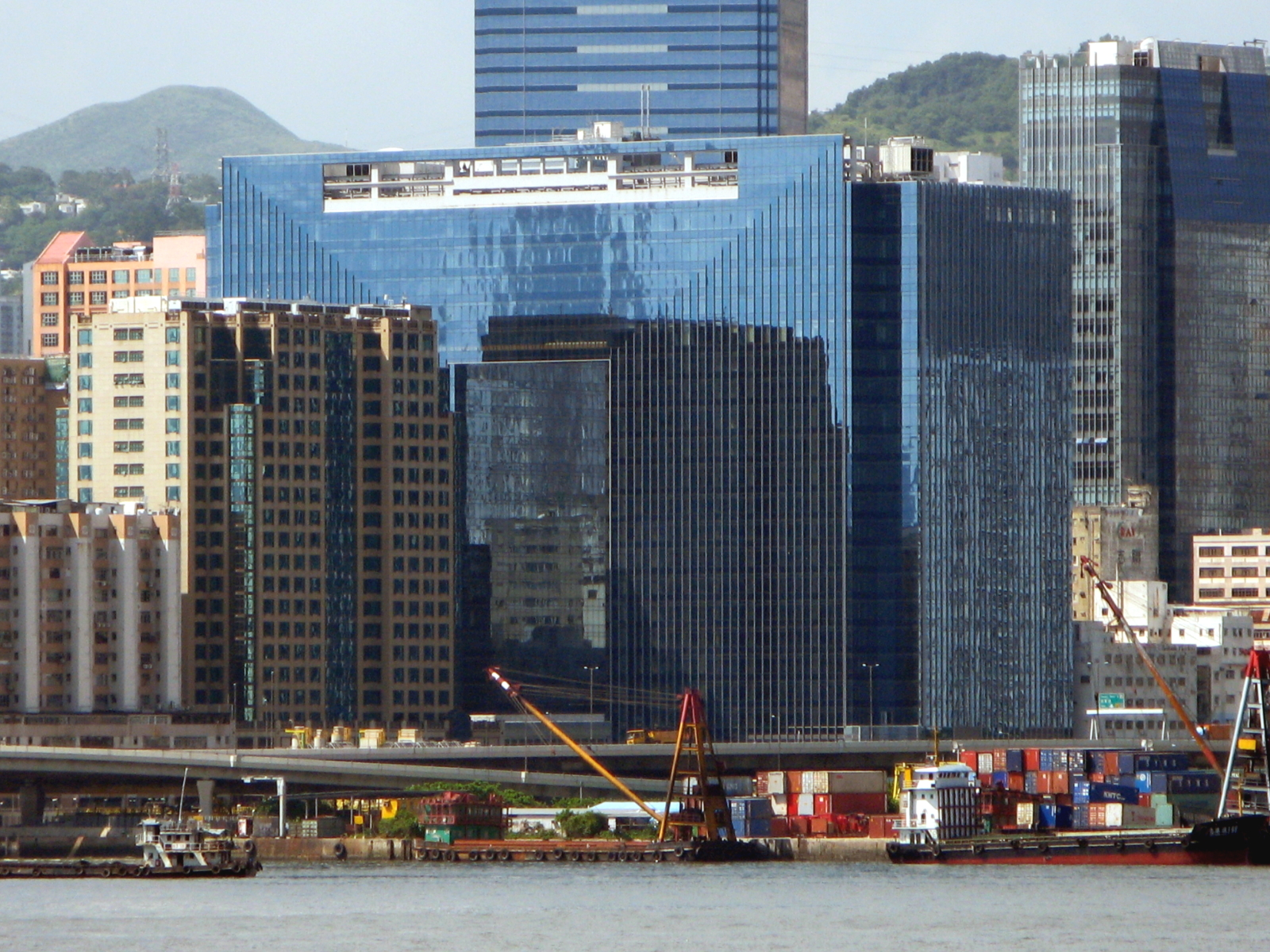
Kwun Tong 223

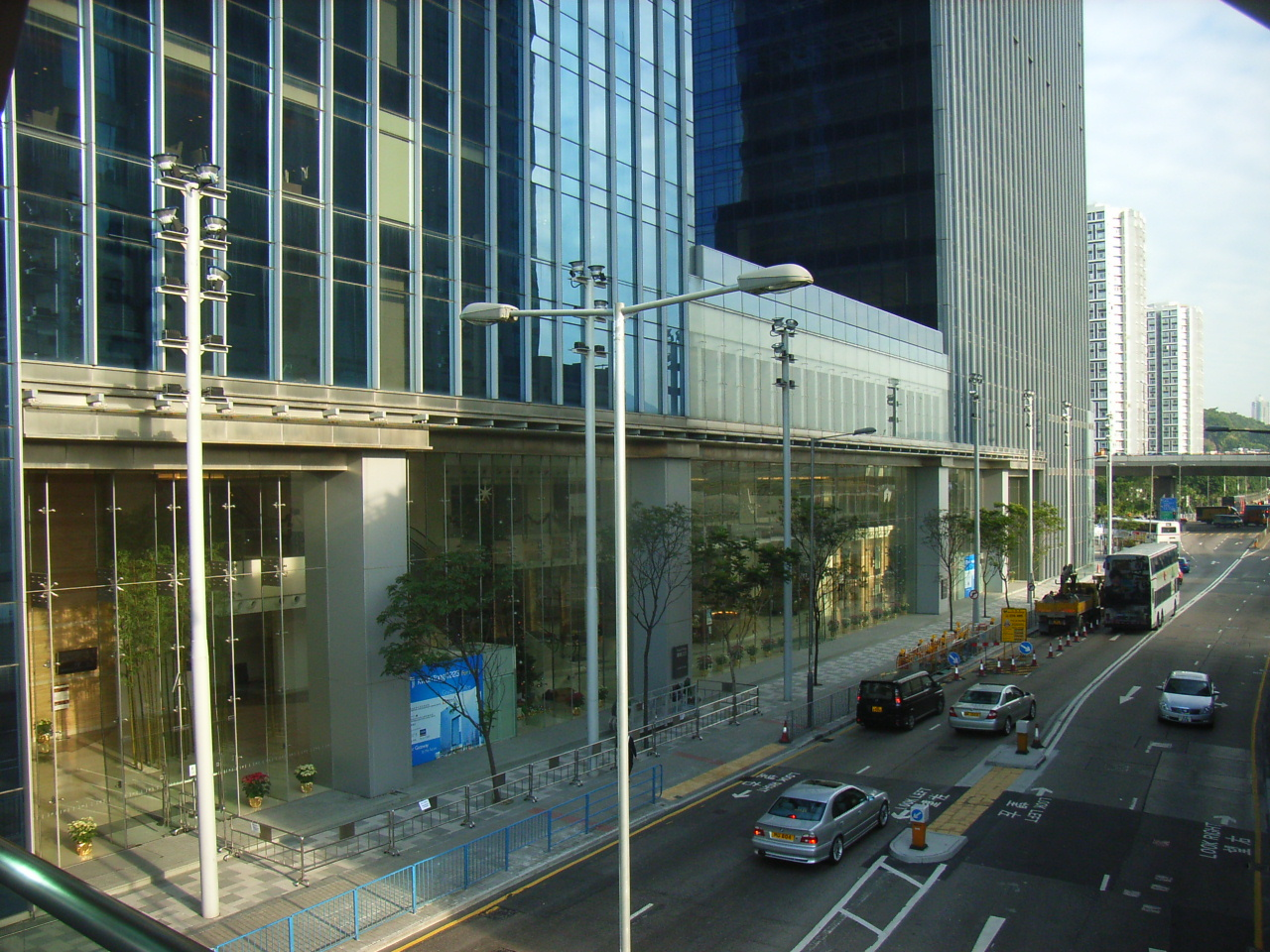
Kwun Tong 223 was renamed as Manulife Financial Centre

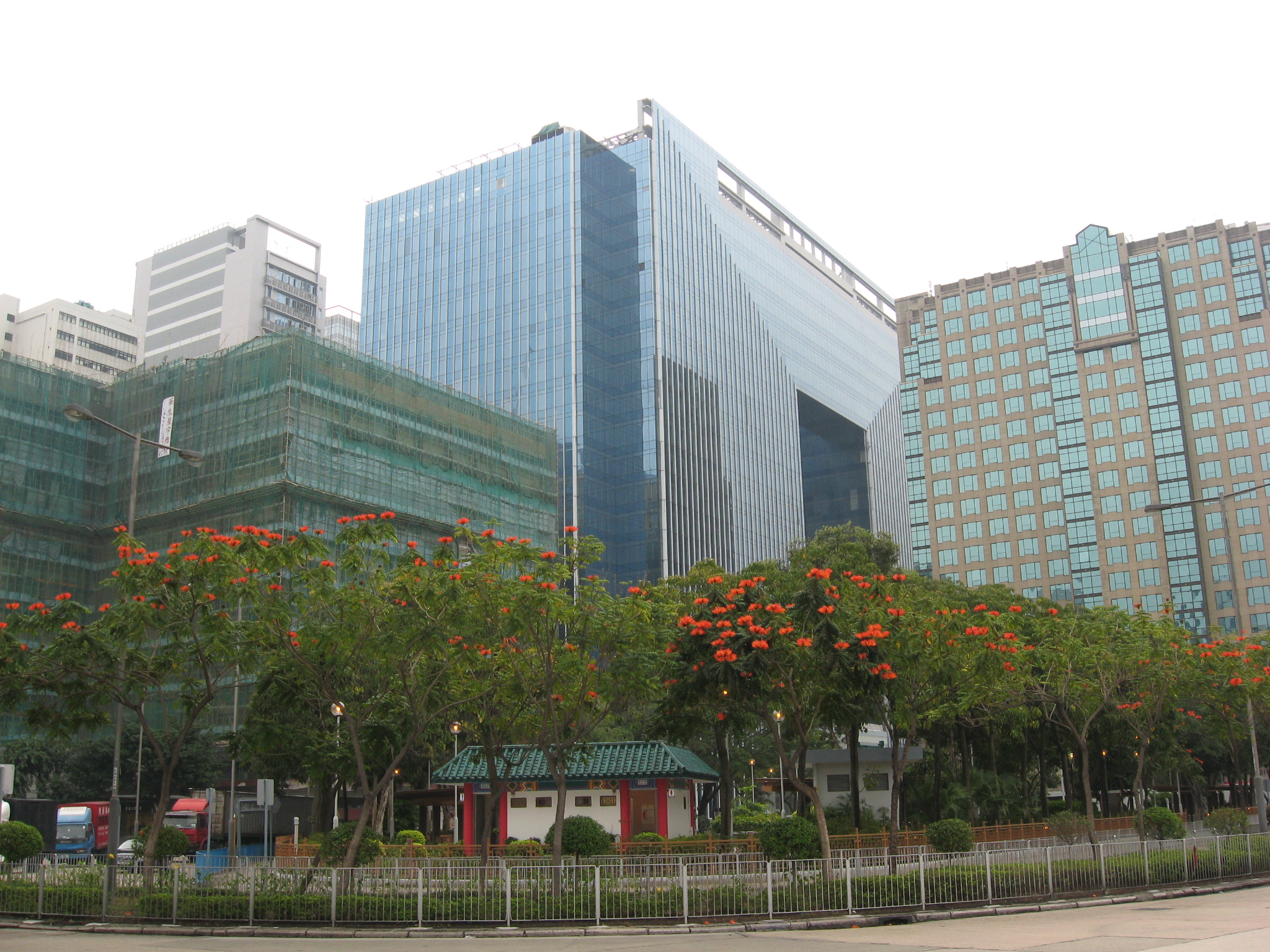
Kwun Tong 223 (January 2008)

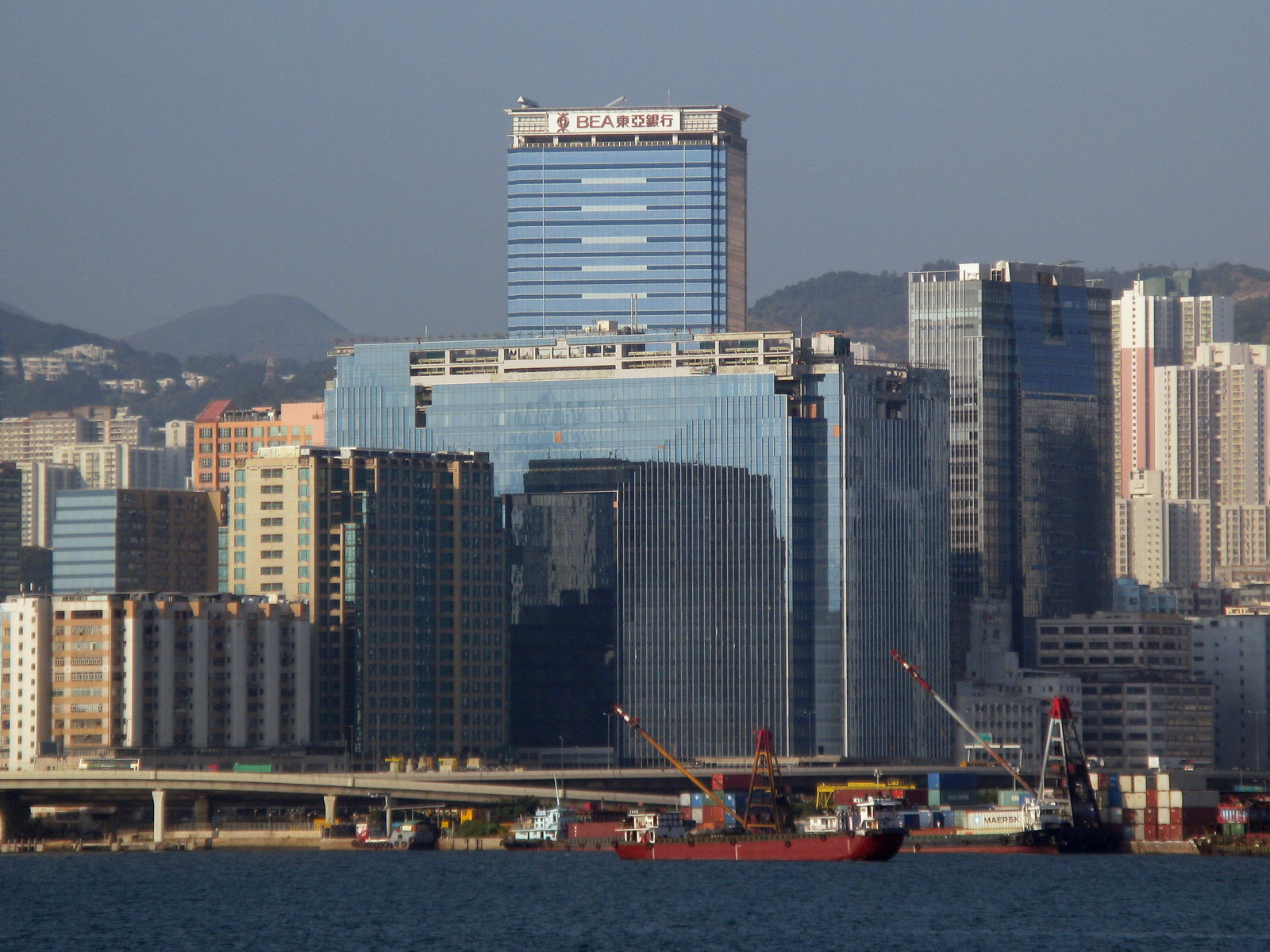
Kwun Tong 223 being built (November 2007)

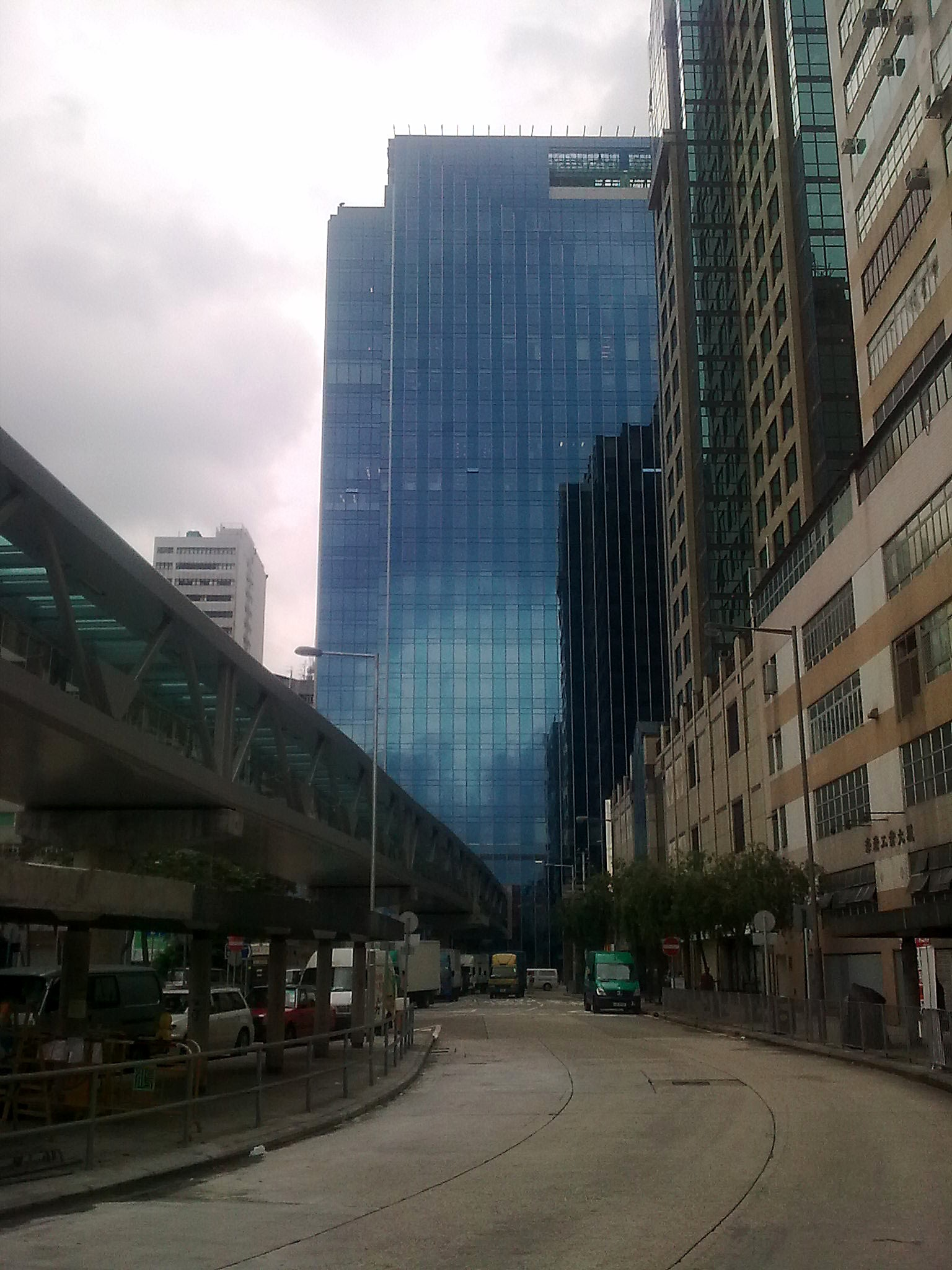
Bridgelink from Kwun Tong Pier to Kwun Tong 223.

Manulife Financial Centre (Chinese: 宏利金融中心) is an office building on Wai Yip Street, Kwun Tong, Kowloon, Hong Kong. Originally named Kwun Tong 223, it was completed during the second quarter of 2008. The building was renamed 'Manulife Financial Centre' from 1 December 2009.

The property was jointly developed by Henderson Land Development and Sun Hung Kai Properties, on land formerly occupied by Dairy Farm's ice factory and a cement factory.

== Introduction ==
Kwun Tong 223 comprises two 28-storey office towers connected with a multistory structured thoroughfare on the top floors. The building form adopts full curtain wall facade design. The superstructure works were completed in just 18 months.

== Features ==
- Floor height is about 2.7 to 3.1 m
- 180-degree sea view
- 862,000 sq ft (80,100 m^{2}) clubhouse
- 50,000 sq ft (4,600 m^{2}) exhibition and conference space

== Tenants ==
Manulife Financial, one of the world's largest insurance firms, has signed a lease for 8 floors of Kwun Tong 223, making it the largest tenant in the building and giving it rights to rename the building and to mount signage on the building itself. The rename is effective from 1 December 2009.

One of the Big Four accounting firms, PricewaterhouseCoopers, announced that it will rent out Kwun Tong 223's 18th and 19th floor at block A as the firm's training centre and the Asian headquarters for its global information management department. In May 2008 it was expected to move in.

Jardine Matheson's long standing business, The Jardine Engineering Corporation, Limited., have moved into the 5th to 7th floor of Block A, as the company headquarters in the Asia Region.

In addition, the world's third largest container freight company CMA CGM's Hong Kong office, including subsidiaries Delmas and ANL have also moved into the 17th and 18th floor of Block B, on 27 December 2008.

In April 2019, the Hong Kong office of Unisys moved to the 8th floor of Block B.

== Transport ==
- MTR Kwun Tong station along Hoi Yuen Road 10 minutes walk
- Kwun Tong Ferry Pier to North Point
- Kwun Tong Public Ferry Pier to Sai Wan Ho
- Kowloon Motor Bus 15A, 23 to Hip Wo Street, Hoi Yuen Road etc.
- Minibus no. 103, to Tseung Kwan O and Clear Water Bay
- Shuttle bus

There is currently a footbridge being constructed with elevator facilities to link Kwun Tong 223 with Kwun Tong Ferry Pier.
