= North Point Estate =

Coordinates: 22.2930°N 114.2004°E

- 北角邨
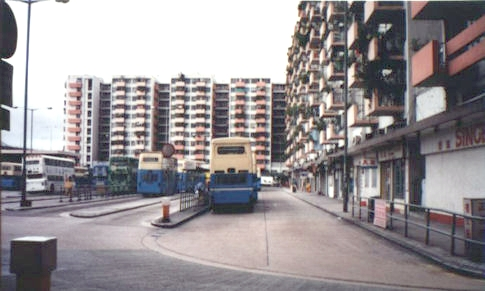
- North Point Estate in 1989

General information
- Status: Demolished
- Completed: 1957
- Demolished: 2003

Technical details
- Floor count: 11

Design and construction
- Architect: Eric Cumine

Other information
- Number of units: 1,956

North Point Estate (Chinese: 北角邨) was a public housing estate at the harbour front of North Point, Hong Kong near North Point Ferry Pier and its bus terminus, approaching Victoria Harbour. It was the largest public housing estate in the Eastern District. It was the second public housing estate built by the Hong Kong Housing Authority and enjoyed a reputation as one of the most impressive construction schemes in Asia and as a public housing estate in one of the most "luxurious" areas on Hong Kong Island.

== History ==
North Point Estate was developed by the Hong Kong Housing Authority and completed in 1957. It comprised seven 11-storey blocks with a total of 1,956 flats. The project cost 33,000,000 HK$, and was designed by architect Eric Cumine.

The estate featured extensive planning that set it apart from the existing public housing developments at the time. For example, the line of flats were broken at regular intervals to ensure cross-ventilation for every flat, each block features its own covered play area, while 20 automatic lifts service the estate. There are also many facilities planned in conjunction with the estate, including: a primary school accommodating 800 pupils; assembly hall; clinic; post office; bus terminus, and a ferry pier (North Point Ferry Pier). It employed 2700 workers during its construction.

When completed in 1957, the then governor of Hong Kong Alexander Grantham attended its inauguration ceremony. The thoughtful design was enjoyed by the community, such as kids who enjoyed the play spaces and open corridors at close proximity to the seafront. Although widely seen as a success, the estate was very expensive to build. As a result, in subsequent years the Hong Kong Housing Authority would did not adopt this design for other public housing estates as to balance costs.

Although North Point Estate was structurally safe, the Housing Authority decided to redevelop the estate due to increasing maintenance problems and costs. The estate was cleared in 2002 and demolished in 2003. Its tenants were rehoused to new units on the Oi Tung Estate at Aldrich Bay, Shau Kei Wan and Hing Wah Estate at Chai Wan.

== The site today ==
On 2 March 2000, the Housing Authority announced the redevelopment of North Point Estate by February 2002. Upon completion of rehousing, the site will be redeveloped after comprehensive planning. This is in line with the Long Term Housing Strategy (LTHS) published in 1998 on the redevelopment of older housing estates on a need basis. Under the Authority's Comprehensive Redevelopment Programme (CRP), 566 housing blocks in 57 estates were redeveloped in 2005. Over 400 buildings were demolished to improve the living conditions of the residents.

After North Point Estate was demolished, the east and central part of the site were used as temporary open car parks and the rest left vacant, for more than ten years. In 2007, the Housing Authority decided to return the site to the government for redevelopment.

From 2017 to 2019, the site was redeveloped. The eastern section became private housing, with a new bus terminus at ground level, while the western section is occupied by Hotel Vic.
