= North Point Ferry Pier =

Ferry pier in North Point, Hong Kong

Coordinates: 22°17′38″N 114°11′59″E

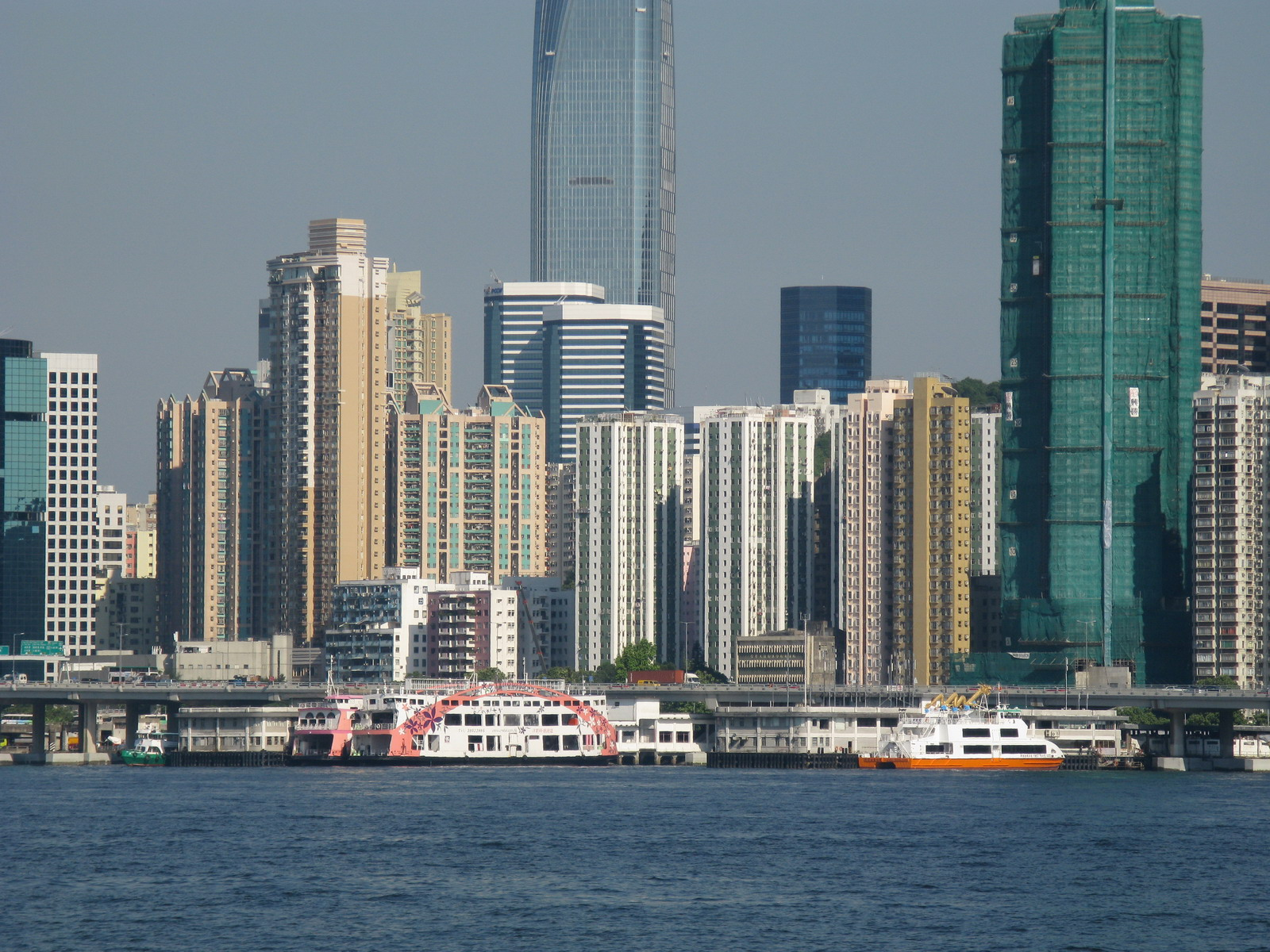
North Point Ferry Pier in July 2008

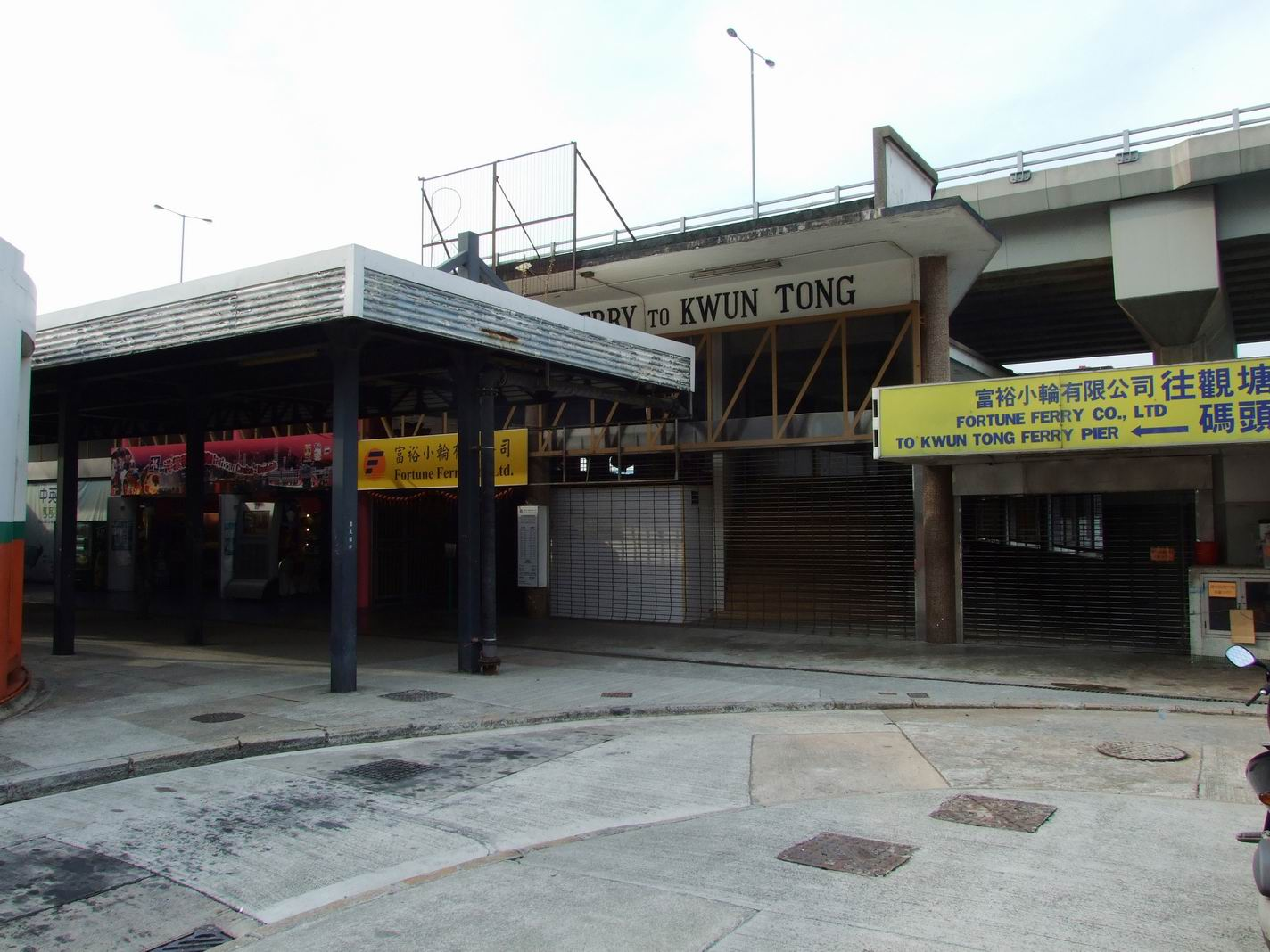
North Point Ferry Pier (East Berth) in November 2007

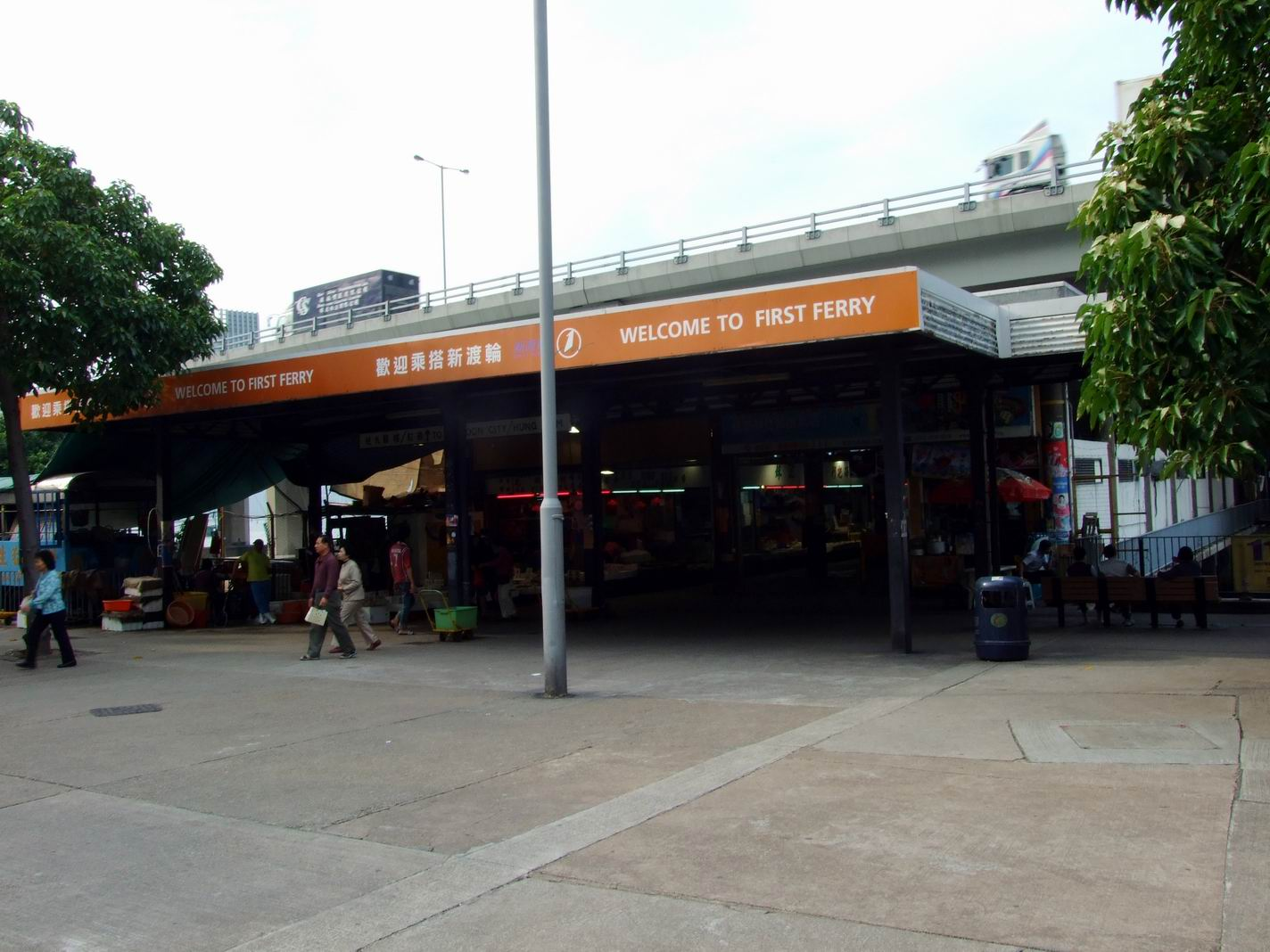
North Point Ferry Pier (West Berth) in November 2007

North Point Ferry Pier (Chinese: 北角碼頭) is a ferry pier in North Point, Hong Kong and it is near the site of the former North Point Estate (北角邨). It started operation in 1963. In 1979, a second passenger berth opened that is located west of the older one.

Until 14 May 2016, the large open-air North Point Ferry Pier Bus Terminus was situated immediately inland of the pier, but that has now been relocated one block east, as 'North Point Ferry Pier Public Transport Interchange' under a new building, and a new building is being erected on the old bus station site.

== Destinations ==
Destination; English	Ferry Pier Name; English
Hung Hom	Hung Hom Ferry Pier
Ma Tau Kok	Kowloon City Ferry Pier
Kwun Tong	Kwun Tong Ferry Pier
Kwun Tong	Kwun Tong Ferry Pier (Dangerous Goods Vehicles (DGV) only)
Mui Wo	Mui Wo (Dangerous Goods Vehicles (DGV) only)
Discovery Bay	Discovery Bay (Dangerous Goods Vehicles (DGV) only)
