= Jardine Engineering Corporation =

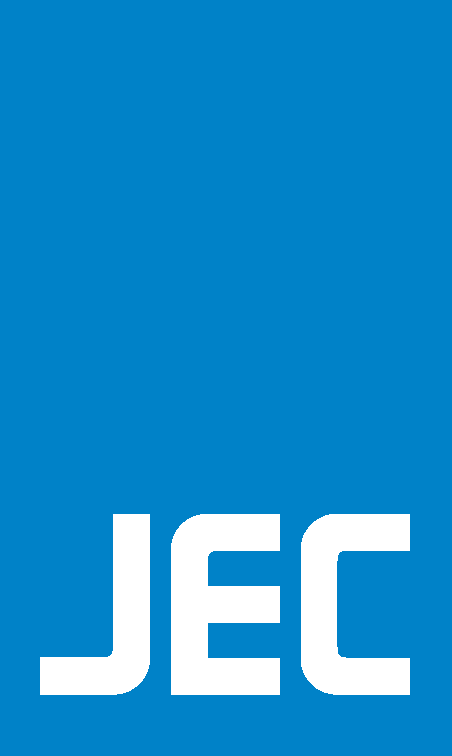
- Company type: Subsidiary
- Industry: Electrical, mechanical and building technologies
- Founded: 1923
- Headquarters: Kwun Tong, Hong Kong
- Area served: Hong Kong; Mainland China; Asia Pacific
- Key people: Kevin O'Brien, Chief Executive
- Number of employees: Approximately 4,000
- Parent: Jardines
- Website: jec.com

Jardine Engineering Corporation (JEC) is a subsidiary of Jardines. Originally established in Shanghai in 1923 to support the group's engineering operations in China. Previously, this had been done by the group's engineering department.

Offices have been established in China, Hong Kong, Macau, Myanmar, Thailand, Singapore and the Philippines.

The company now employs more than 4,000 staff across the Asia Pacific region; a third of these staff are working in Hong Kong where JEC has its headquarters and the remainder work from other offices in Asia. The JEC headquarters is in Manulife Financial Centre, Kwun Tong, which housed three main business units (Electrical and Mechanical Contracting, Maintenance and Renovation and Building Equipment and Products), finance, IT, administration, EHS and human capital and communications.

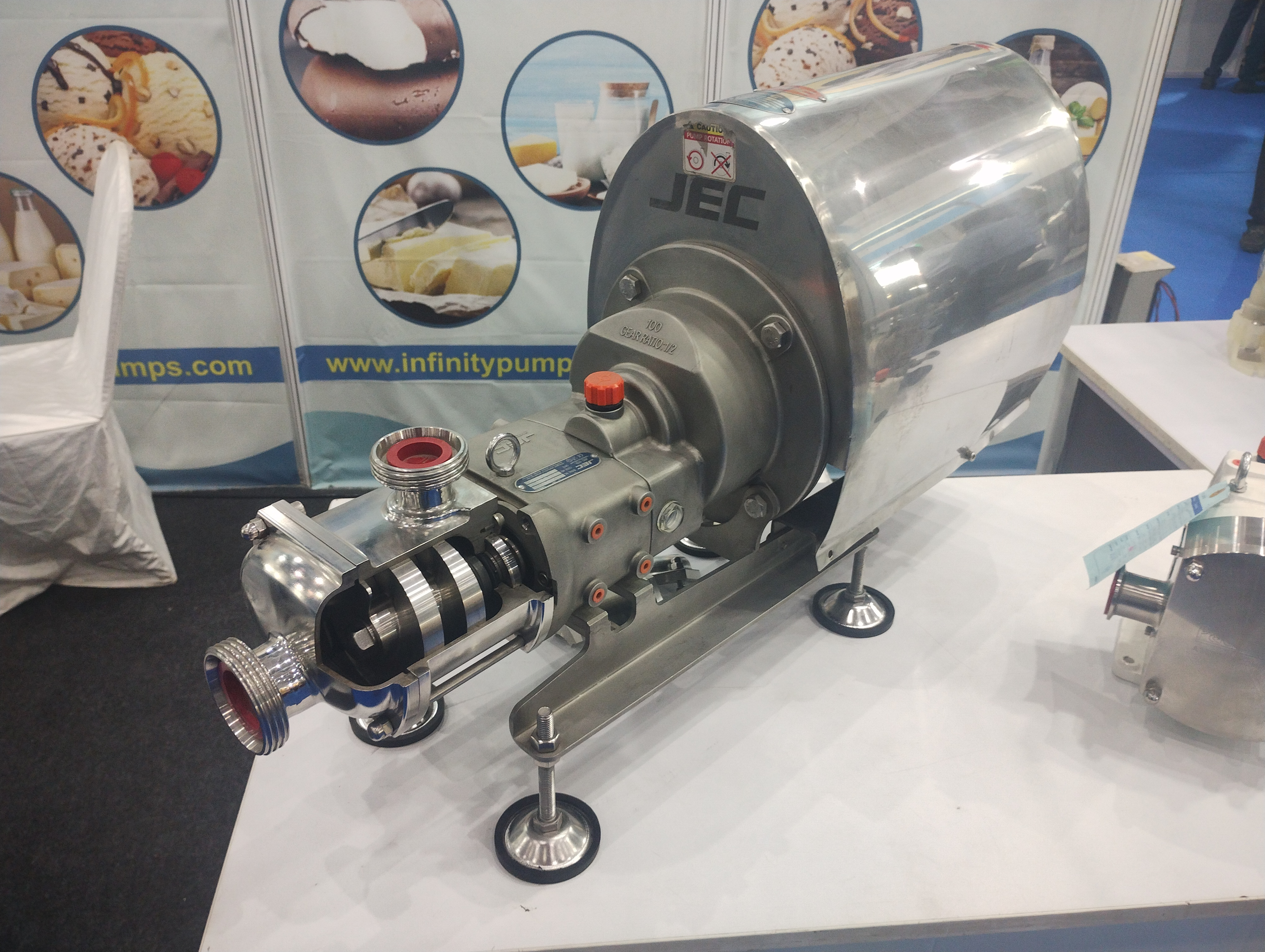
A JEC pump at Bangalore International Exhibition Centre (2025)

== Notable projects ==
JEC has been involved in the construction of various major projects in Hong Kong and around the region.

Electrical and mechanical related

- Hong Kong International Airport Baggage Handling Systems
- Hong Kong Harbour Area Treatment Scheme (HATS)
- MTR's Airport Express and Tung Chung lines platform screen doors
- MTR's Siu Ho Wan, Wong Chuk Hang Depot Equipment
- MTR's Ma On Shan line Extension
- HACTL's SuperTerminal 1 at Chek Lap Kok, Hong Kong
- T. Park, Hong Kong's First Self-Sustaining Sludge Treatment Facility
- City of Dreams Manila in the Philippines
- BITEC 2 in Bangkok
- Bangkok MRT Blue Line and Red Line

Service related

- Two IFC MVAC
- Tamar Government Headquarters
- The Link Operation and Maintenance
- Main Contract Works for Data Centre in Hong Kong
- Hongkong Land's Grade A Properties
- HKIA North Satellite Concourse and Midfield Development
- JLL in the Philippines
- Ayala Property Management Corporation in the Philippines

Building technologies related

- Tung Chung Super-Oxygenation System (Hong Kong's first Super-oxygenation system at the Tung Chung Sewage Pumping Station)
- Lo Wu Correctional Institute
- Stonecutters Bridge
- Kowloon Hospital Solar-Wind Turbine System
- Hong Kong Science Park Green Building Technologies
- Chek Lap Kok Fire Station PV Power
- Cheung Sha Wan Sewage Pumping Station PV
