= Tai Koo Shing Ferry Pier =

Former pier in Hong Kong

Coordinates: 22.2848°N 114.2208°E

Tai Koo Shing Ferry Pier (Chinese: 太古城碼頭) (1980 - 1983) was a small-sized barge pier in Tai Koo Shing, Quarry Bay, Hong Kong. Its location is now near Poyang Mansion (鄱陽閣), Tsui Woo Terrance (翠湖台). The pier was opened in 1980 to relieve traffic congestion problems in King's Road. The Hong Kong and Yaumati Ferry Company provided ferry services to Central and Kowloon City from there. It was closed when the Sai Wan Ho Ferry Pier in Sai Wan Ho started operation in 1983.

== See also ==
- List of demolished piers in Hong Kong
