= Coral Sea Ferry =

Hong Kong ferry operator

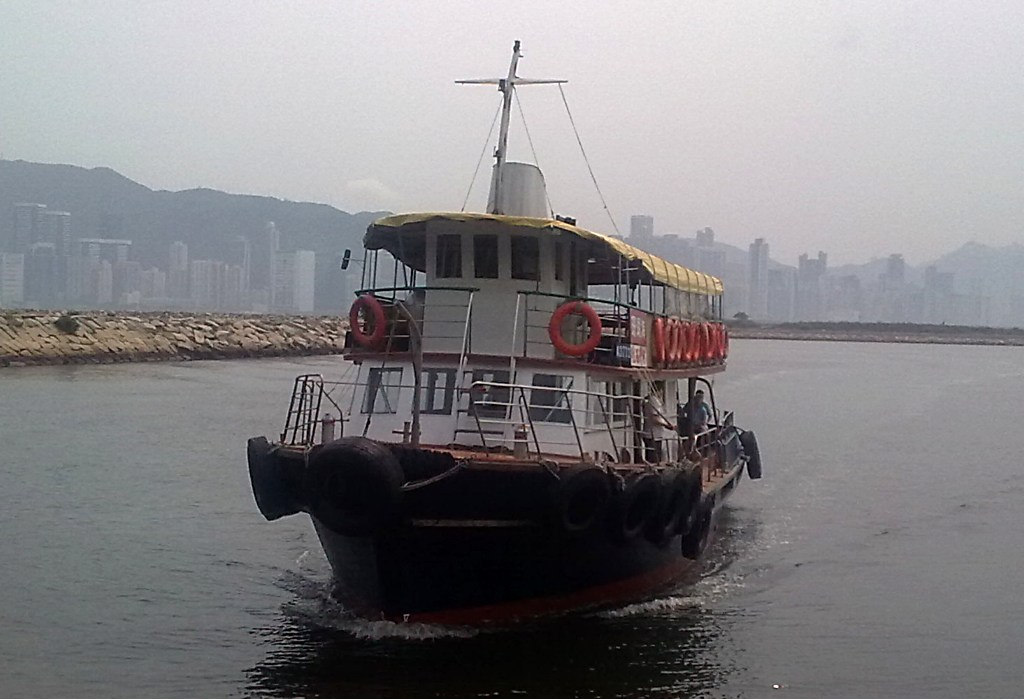
Coral Sea Ferry's kai-to sailing into Kwun Tong Public Pier.

Coral Sea Ferry Service Company Limited (Chinese: 珊瑚海船務有限公司), also known as Coral Sea Ferry (簡稱珊瑚海船務), is a ferry transport company in Hong Kong. It was established in 1992 and took over the Sam Ka Tsuen – Sai Wan Ho route from Hongkong and Yaumati Ferry. Coral Sea Ferry has since expanded its business to three routes.

== Routes ==
- Sai Wan Ho – Sam Ka Tsuen
- Sai Wan Ho – Kwun Tong
- Sam Ka Tsuen – Joss House Bay/Tung Lung Chau

== Fleet ==
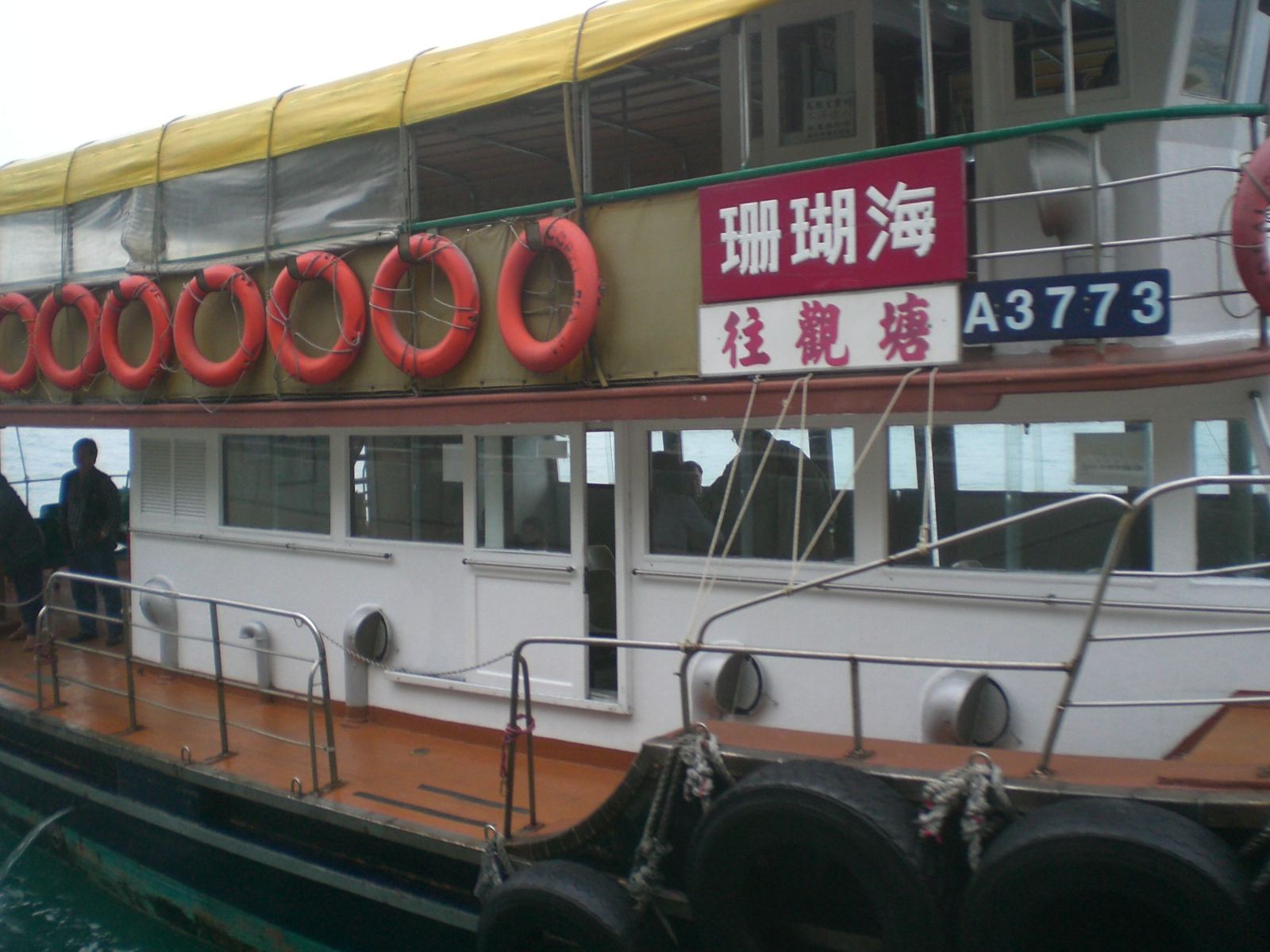
Coral Sea Ferry's kai-to parked at Sai Wan Ho Pier.

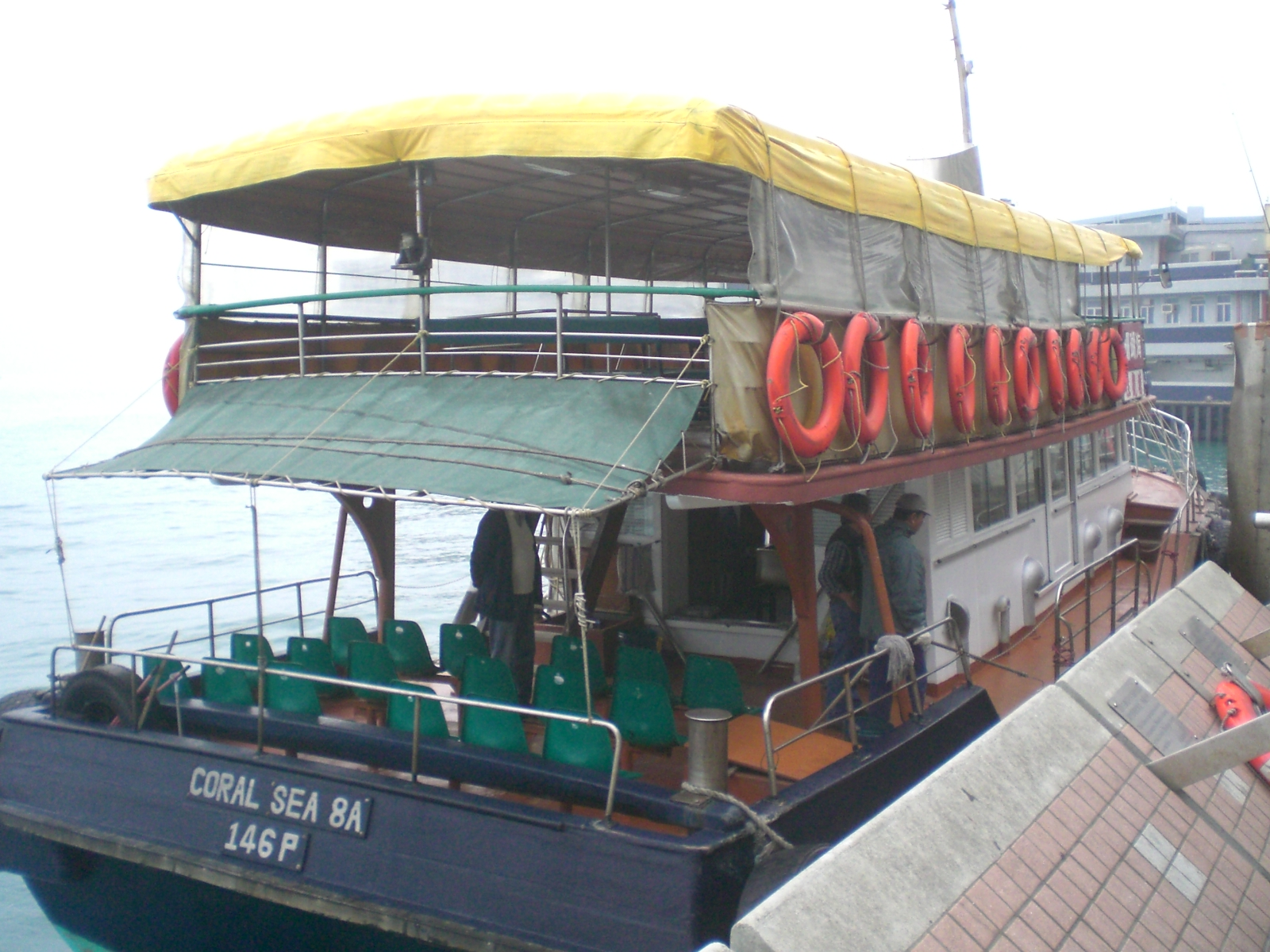
Coral Sea Ferry's kai-to parked at Sai Wan Ho Pier.

- M.V. Coral Sea 8 (17.5M wooden kai-to ferry; operates on Sam Ka Tsuen – Tung Lung Chau route)
- M.V. Coral Sea 8A (17.5M wooden kai-to ferry; operates on Sai Wan Ho – Kwun Tong route)
- M.V. Coral Sea 18 (17.5M wooden kai-to ferry; operates on Ping Chau – Hei Ling Chau – Mui Wo route)
- M.V. Coral Sea 18A (17.5M wooden kai-to ferry; operates on Sai Wan Ho – Sam Ka Tsuen route)
