= Kwun Tong Ferry Pier =

Pier in Kowloon, Hong Kong

Coordinates: 22°18′22.82″N 114°13′17.62″E

- Traditional Chinese: 觀塘碼頭
- Simplified Chinese: 观塘码头
Transcriptions
Standard Mandarin
- Hanyu Pinyin: Guàntáng Mǎtóu
Yue: Cantonese
- Jyutping: gun1 tong4 maa5 tau4

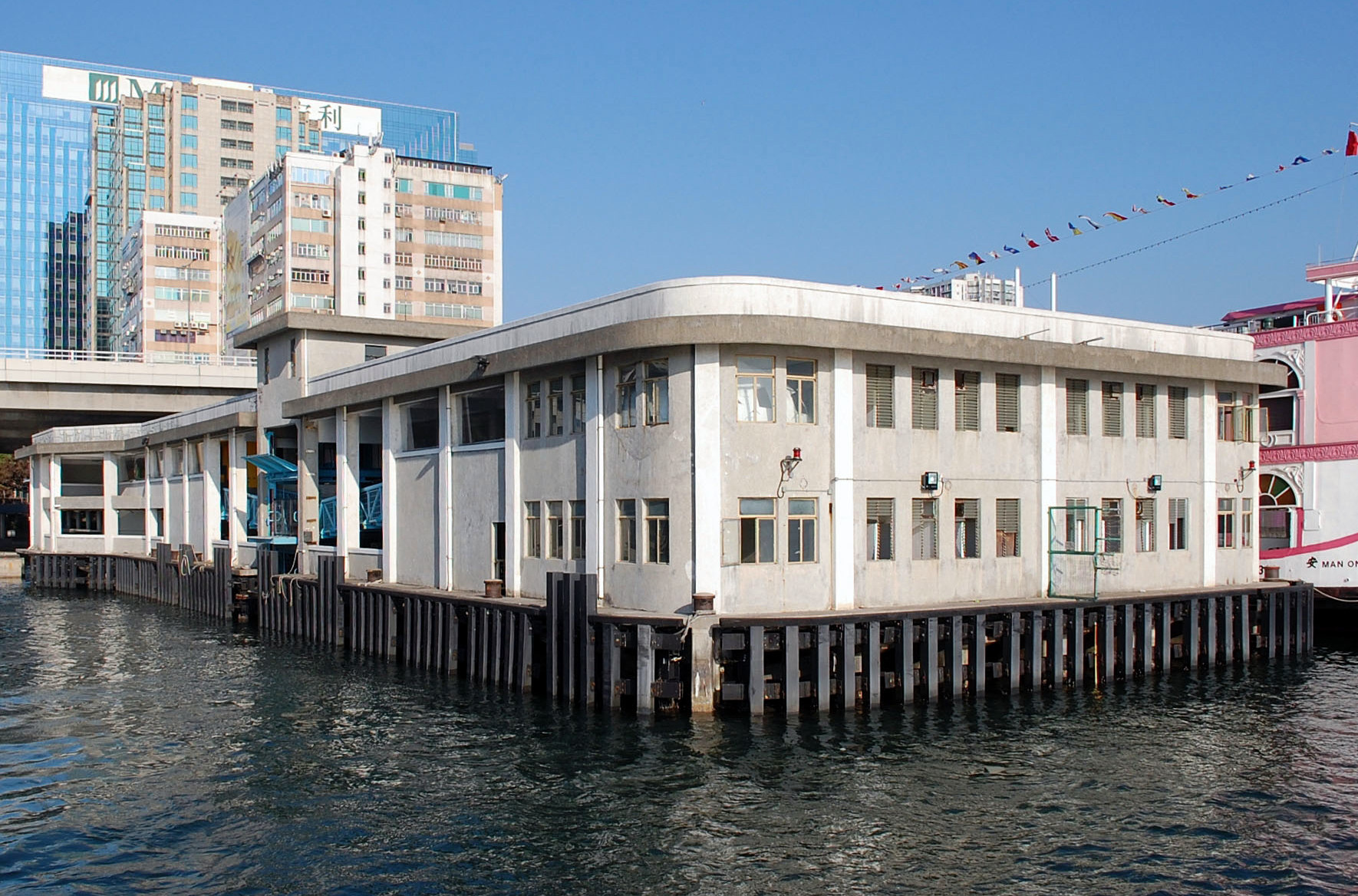
Kwun Tong Ferry Pier in January 2014

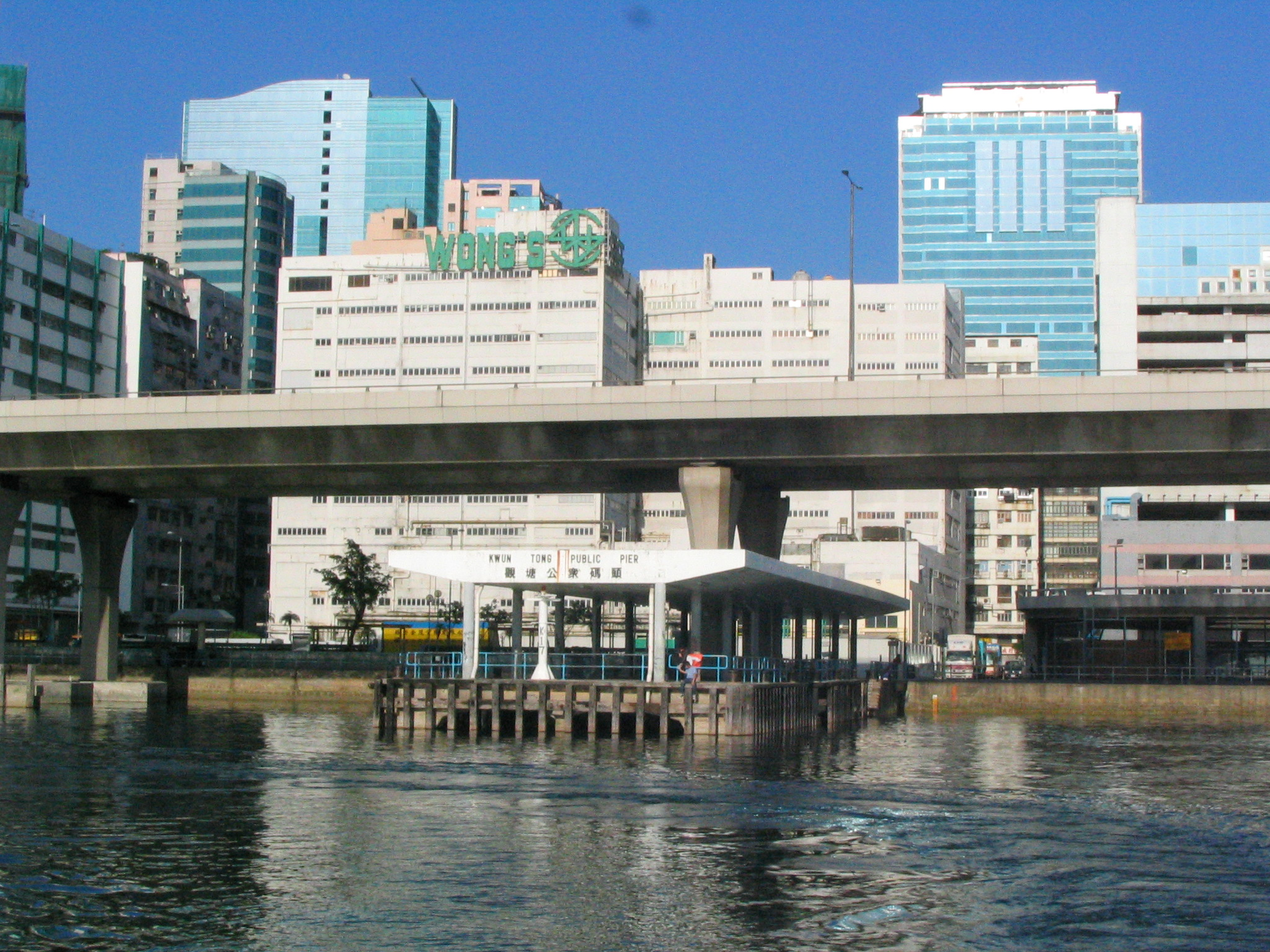
Kwun Tong Public Pier in December 2006

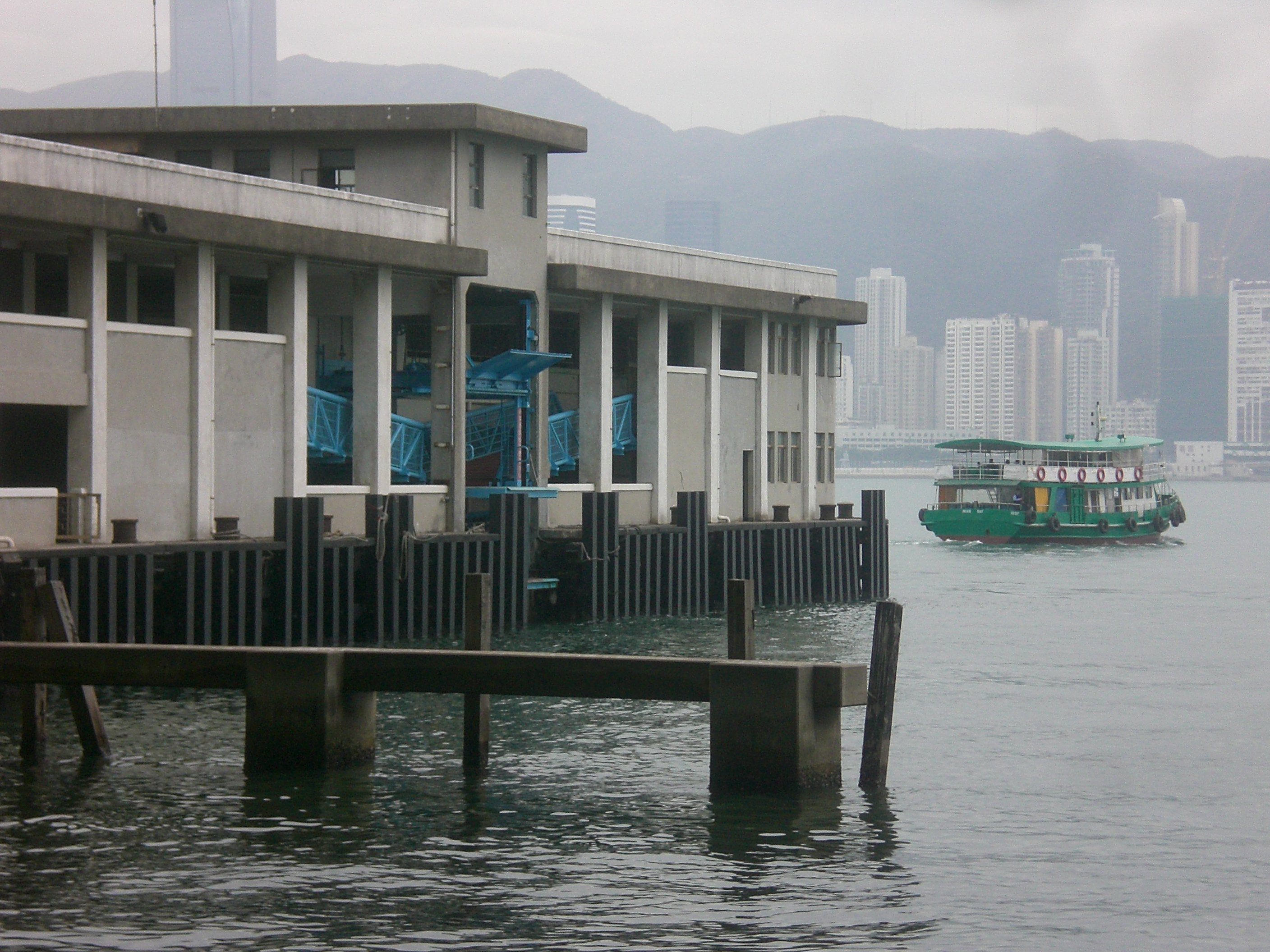
Kwun Tong Ferry Pier side view in January 2010

Kwun Tong Ferry Pier (Chinese: 觀塘碼頭) is a ferry pier situated on Hoi Yuen Road, Kwun Tong, Kowloon, Hong Kong. The pier was originally situated at Ngau Tau Kok called "Ngau Tau Kok Ferry Pier" (Chinese: 牛頭角碼頭), but during the 1960s, due to reclamation work, the pier was moved to Kwun Tong.

The ferry pier complex consists of three piers: a passenger ferry pier, a vehicular ferry pier and a public pier. Parts of the ground floor and upper floor of the vehicular ferry pier were used as Kwun Tong Driving School. There is a footbridge linking Kwun Tong Ferry Pier and Manulife Financial Centre.

The passenger ferry pier used to provide services to both Shau Kei Wan and North Point, but after the Shau Kei Wan service was terminated, its half of the ferry pier was converted into a supermarket. As business declined it also closed. Today it is no longer occupied, but is sometimes used as exhibition space.

There is a bus terminus, which is known as Kwun Tong Ferry, is the largest bus terminus in Kwun Tong District.

== Routes ==
Kwun Tong Ferry Pier was formerly one of the major piers used by Hongkong and Yaumati Ferry. It provided regular car ferry and passenger ferry services to Central, North Point and Shau Kei Wan.

But with the opening of the MTR and the opening of the Eastern Harbour Crossing, both the car and passenger numbers dwindled and the ferry services were terminated. However, ferry services between Kwun Tong, North Point and Mui Wo are still operated by Hongkong and Yaumati Ferry, as vehicles with dangerous goods are prohibited from using any one of the cross harbour tunnels.

Today, Fortune Ferry (Chinese: 富裕小輪) still provides a regular service between Kwun Tong and North Point via the Kai Tak Runway Park Pier. Foot passenger fare HK$5, bicycles $5.50; the journey time is approximately 12 minutes.

Coral Sea Ferry (Chinese: 珊瑚海船務) also provides a regular Kai-to ferry service between Kwun Tong Public Pier and Sai Wan Ho every half hour, fare HK$9; the journey time is approximately 15 minutes.

== Gallery ==
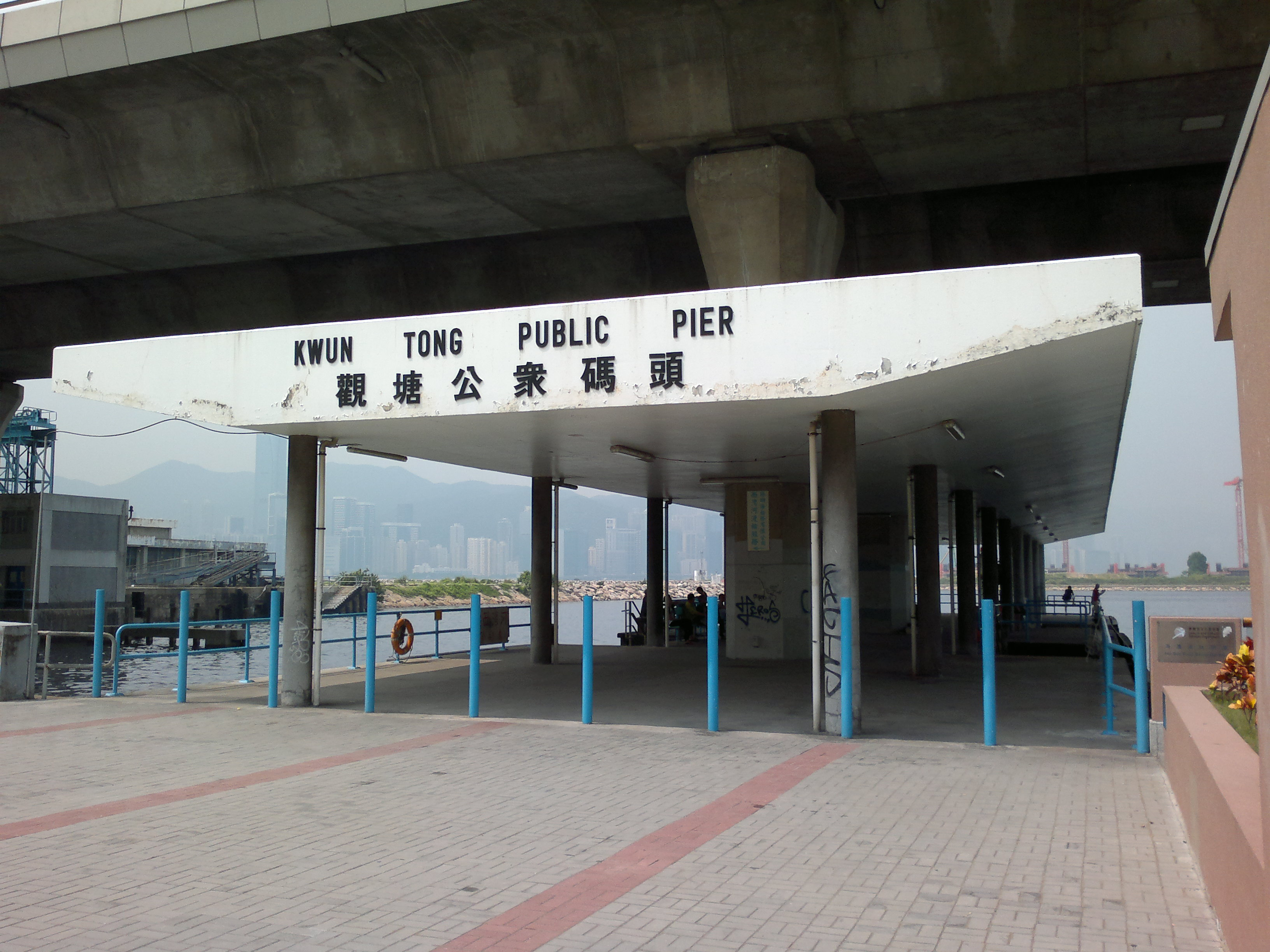
Entrance of Kwun Tong Public Pier in August 2011

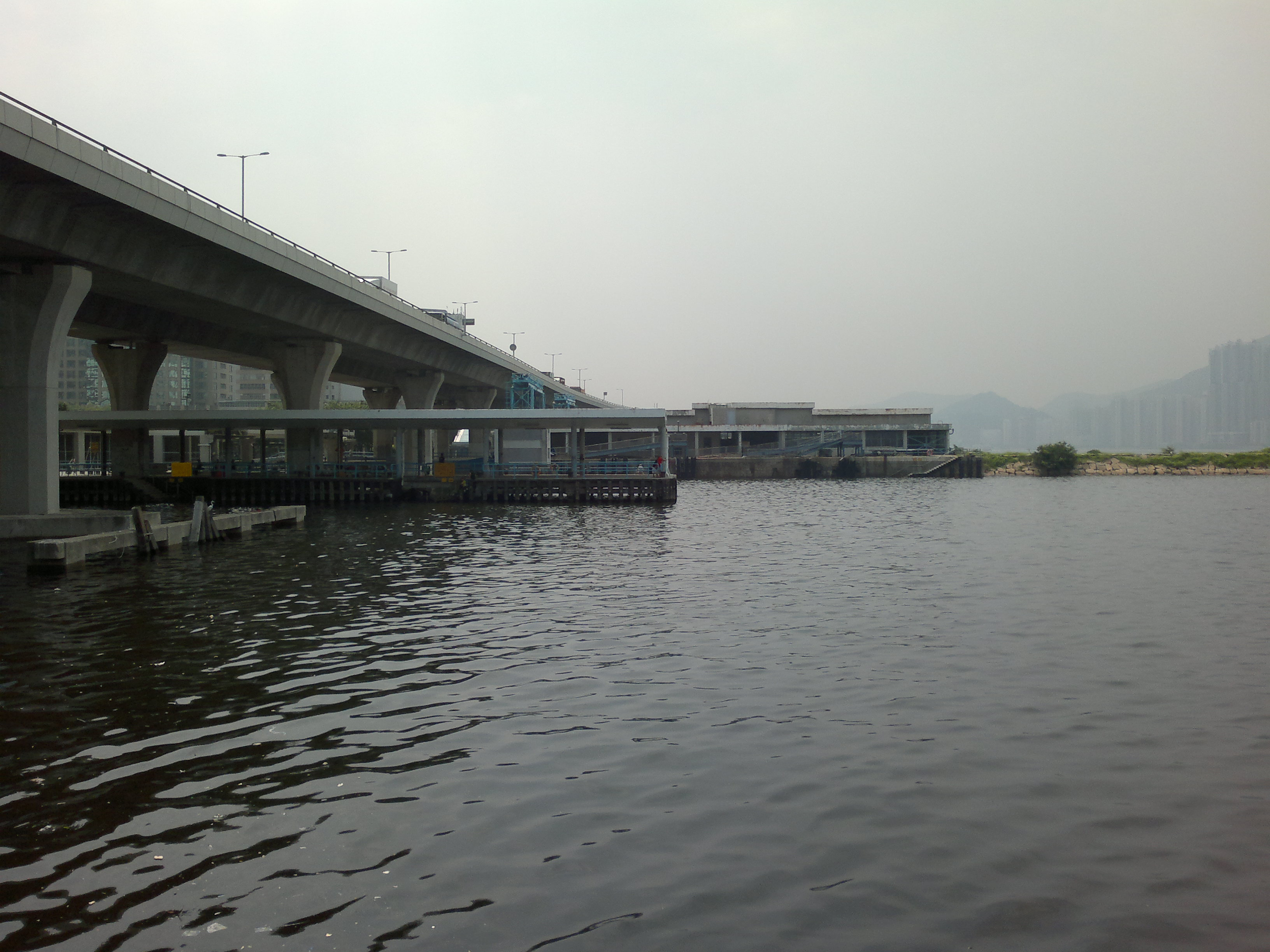
Side view of Kwun Tong Public Pier in August 2011

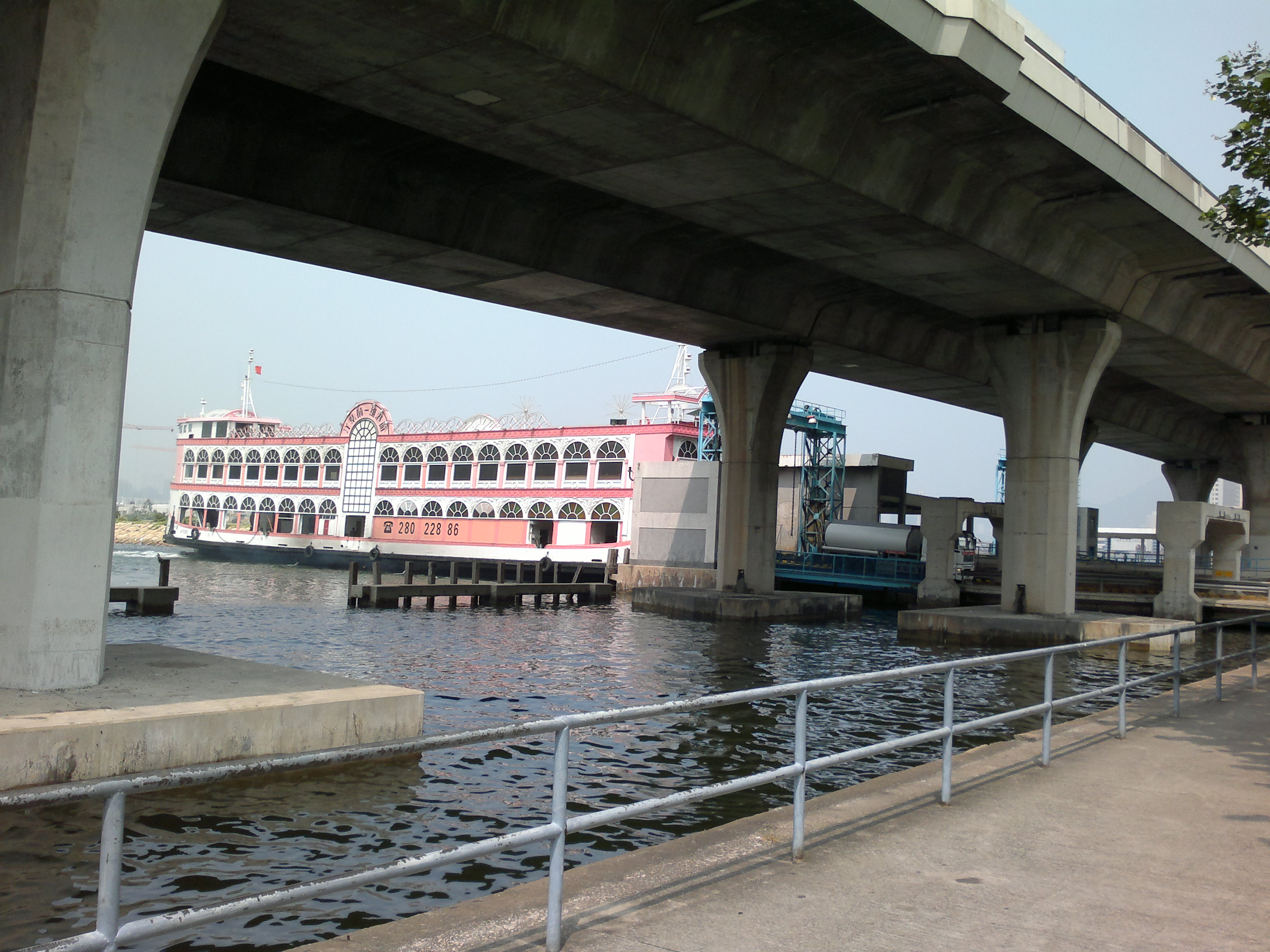
Dangerous goods vehicles were unloading on Kwun Tong Vehicular Ferry Pier in August 2011.

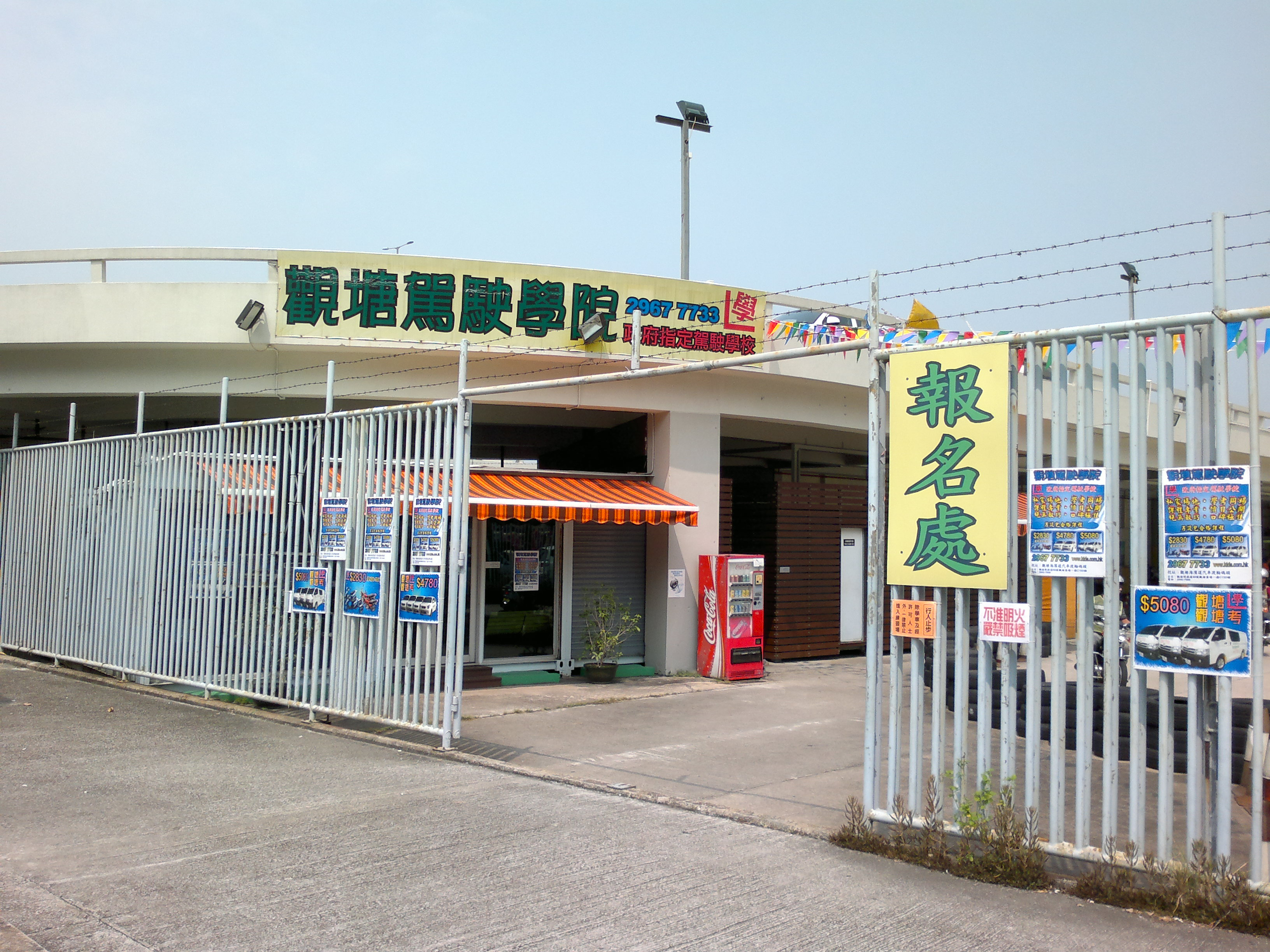
Parts of Kwun Tong Vehicular Ferry Pier had been leased to Kwun Tong Driving School. Taken in August 2011.

== Filming location ==
The 1999 film The Legend of Speed by Andrew Lau, featuring Ekin Cheng and Cecilia Cheung, used the pier as the location for the starting/ending point for the car racing scenes.
