= Lei Yue Mun =

Short channel in Hong Kong

Coordinates: 22°17′5″N 114°14′18″E

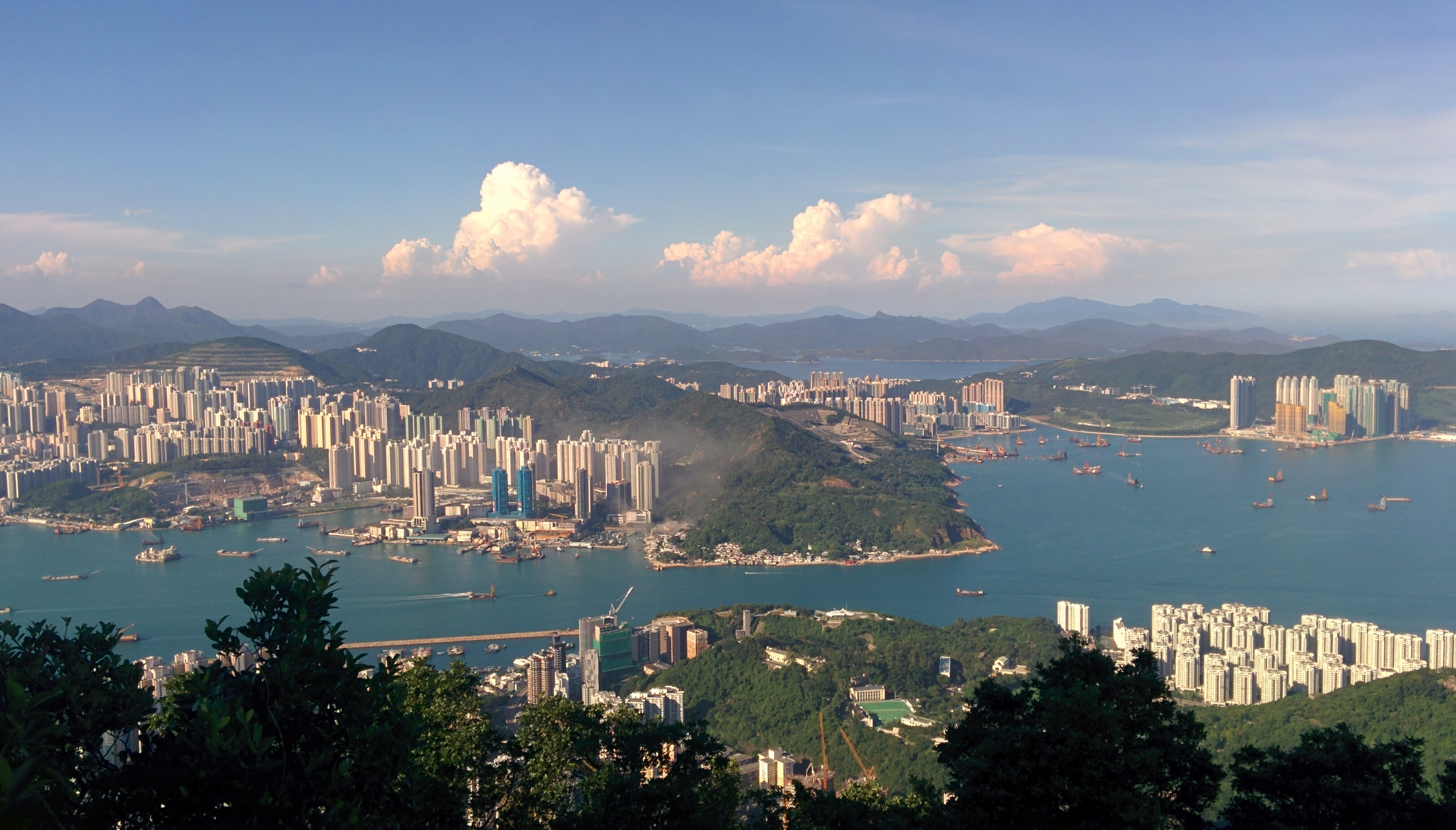
- Lei Yue Mun, viewed from Mount Parker
- Traditional Chinese: 鯉魚門
- Simplified Chinese: 鲤鱼门
- Literal meaning: Carp Gate
Transcriptions
Standard Mandarin
- Hanyu Pinyin: Lǐyúmén
- Wade–Giles: Li-yü-mên
Yue: Cantonese
- Yale Romanization: Léih yùh mùhn
- Jyutping: Lei5 jyu4 mun4

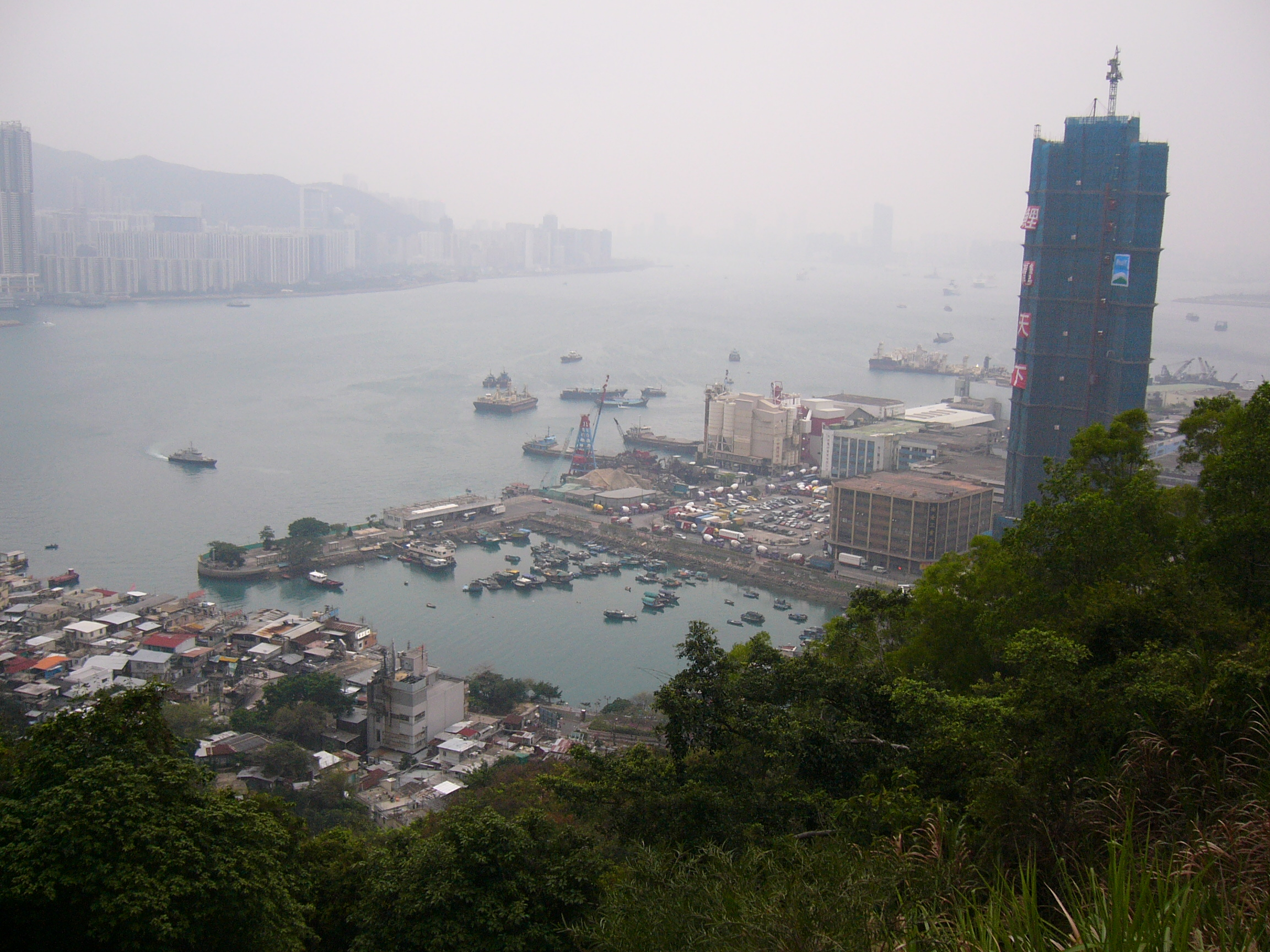
A photo showing the shores of Lei Yue Mun and Yau Tong, Sam Ka Tsuen Typhoon Shelter and Sam Ka Tsuen.

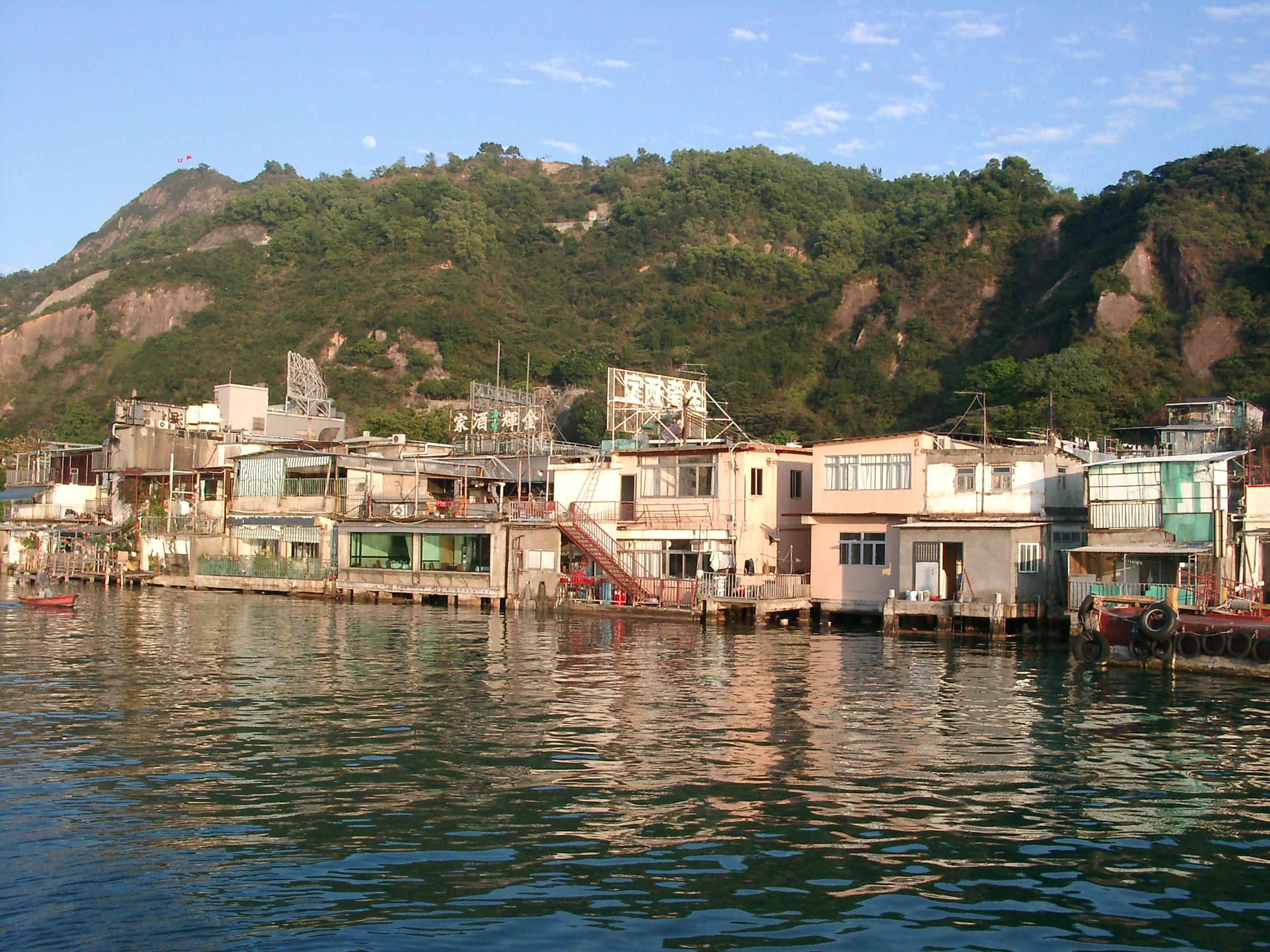
A village and seafood restaurants in Lei Yue Mun, Kowloon.

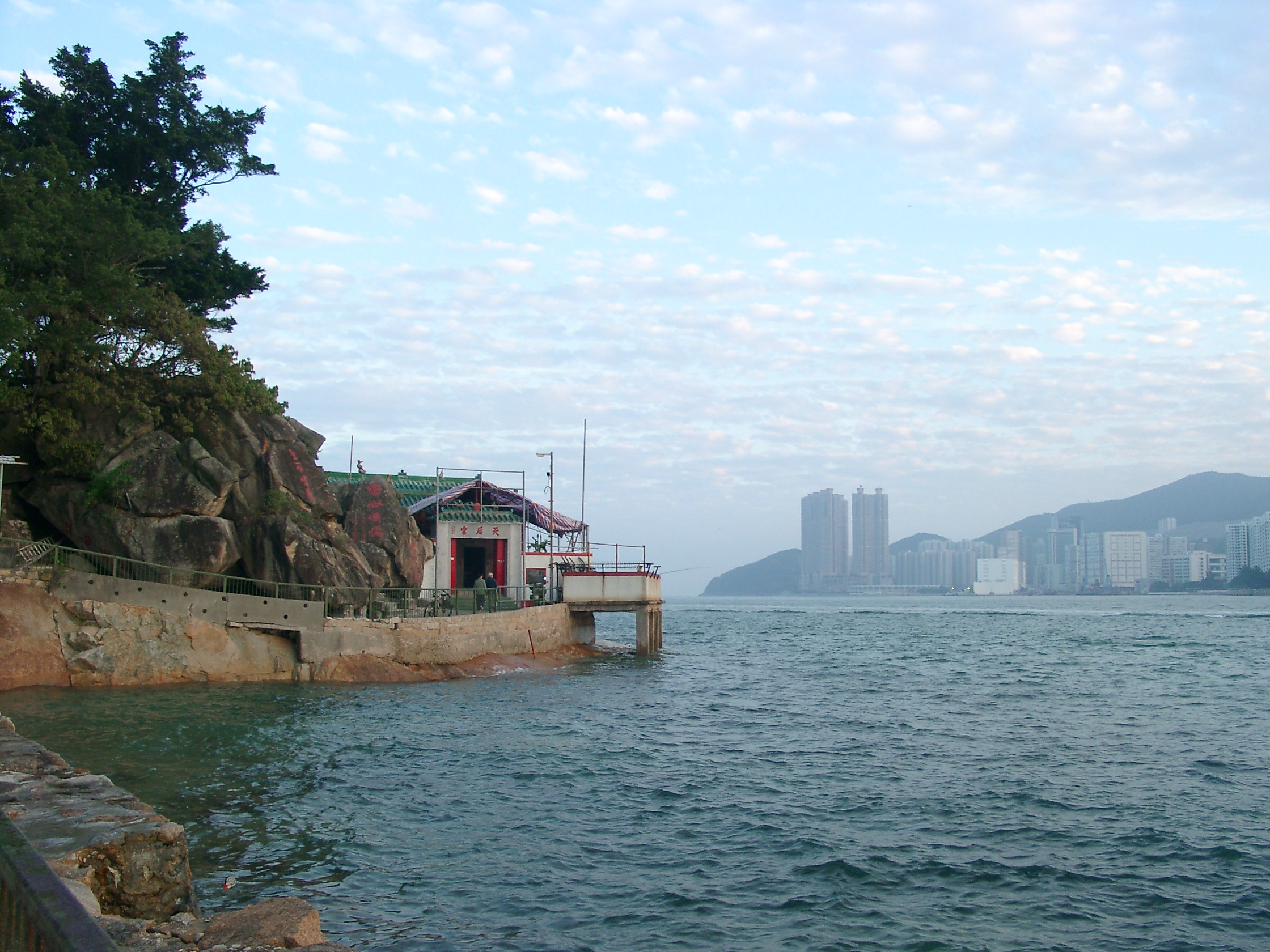
A Tin Hau temple in Lei Yue Mun, Kowloon.

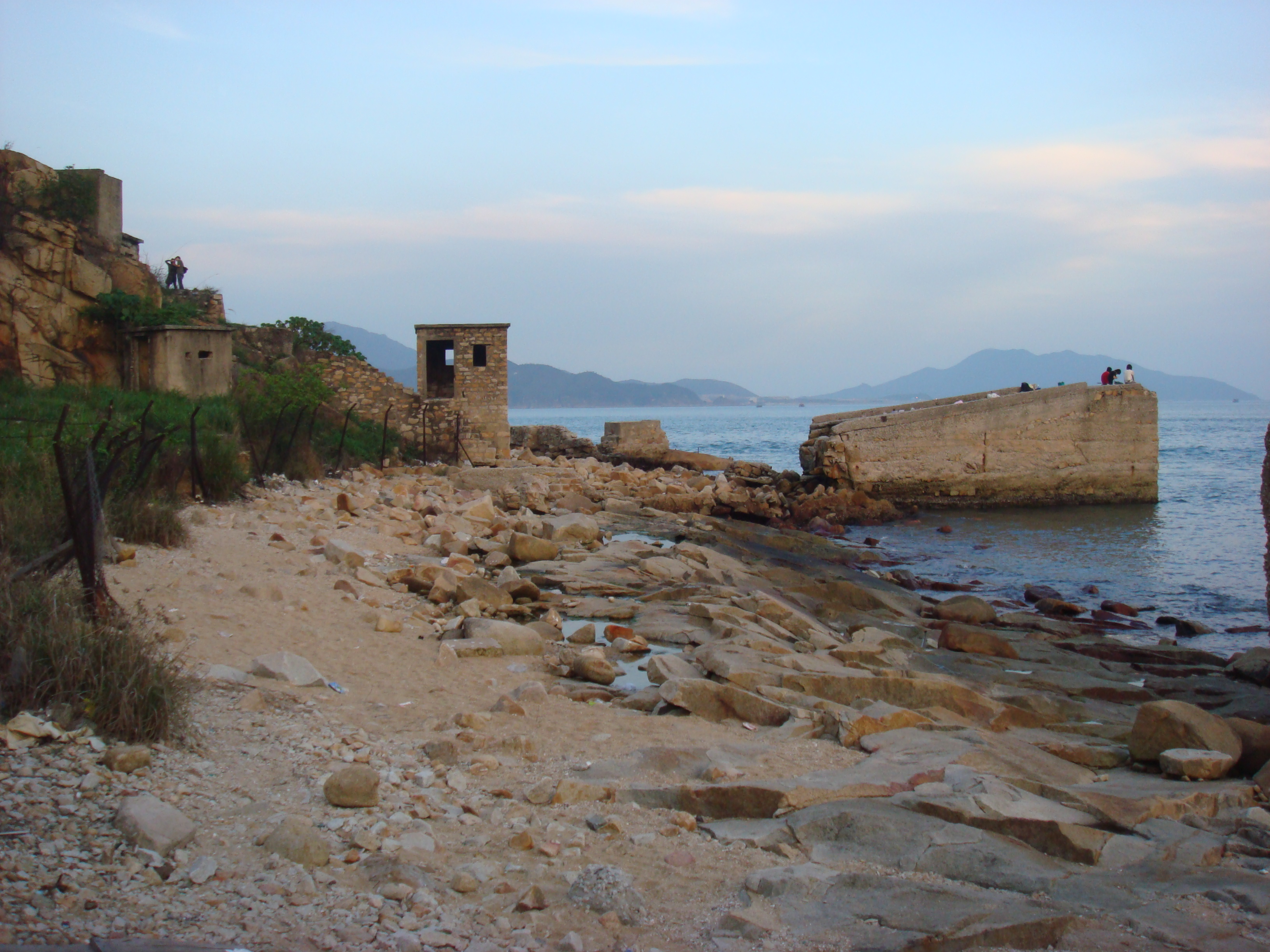
Ruins of loading ramps for the former stone quarries, in Lei Yue Mun, Kowloon.

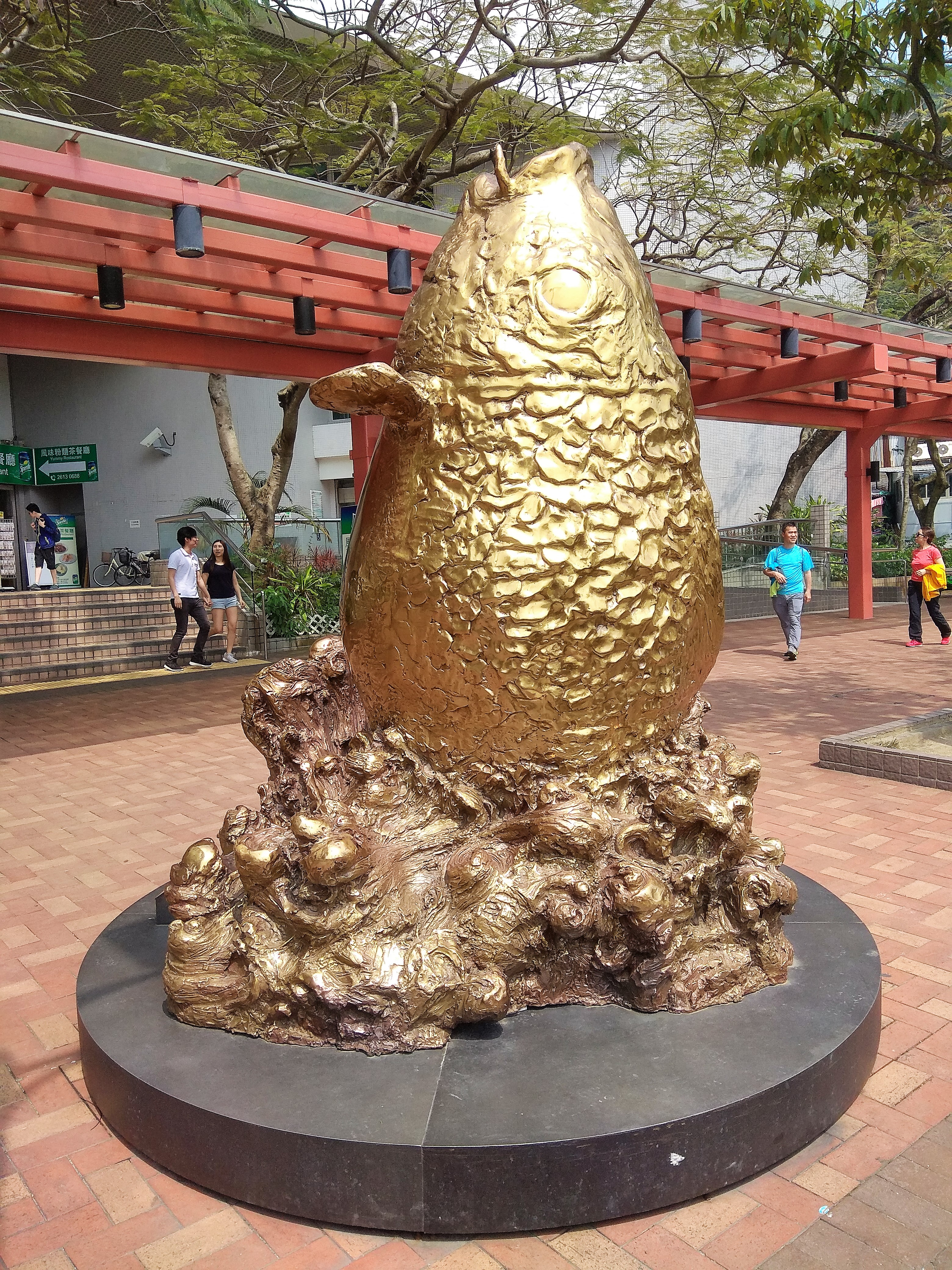
Joyful Jump (鯉躍龍門之與鯉同樂), a sculpture in front of Lei Yue Mun Municipal Services Building, depicting a carp leaping the Dragon Gate.

Lei Yue Mun is a short channel in Hong Kong. It lies between Junk Bay and Victoria Harbour, separating Kowloon and Hong Kong Island. The channel is an important passage for the city, forming the eastern entrance of Victoria Harbour.

The lands around the channel are also called Lei Yue Mun. On Kowloon side, it is famous for its seafood market and restaurants in the fishing villages. On the Hong Kong Island side, it has former military defence facilities.

== Names ==
The Chinese name for the channel means "Carp Gate" and is pronounced Lei5 jyu4 mun4 in Cantonese. It has been variously transcribed and translated over the years, appearing as the Ly-ce-moon Pass, the Ly-ee-moon Pass, Ly-e-Mun Pass, Lyemun, Lymoon, and the Lye Moon Passage.

== Places and facilities ==
On Hong Kong Island

- Lei Yue Mun Fort, converted into the Hong Kong Museum of Coastal Defence
- Lyemun Barracks, converted into the Lei Yue Mun Park and Holiday Village

On Kowloon

- Lei Yue Mun Village (鯉魚門村):
  - Ma Pui Tsuen (馬背村)
  - Ma San Tsuen (媽山村)
  - Ma Wan Tsuen (馬環村)
  - Sam Ka Tsuen (三家村)
- Sam Ka Tsuen Typhoon Shelter (三家村避風塘)
- Tin Hau temple, a Grade II historic building in Ma Wan Tsuen (馬環村). The temple was built in 1753 and completely reconstructed in 1953. A Hip Tin Temple adjacent to the Tin Hau Temple was added after 1953 for the worship of Kwan Tai.
- Old Quarry Site Structures, listed as Grade III historic buildings.
- Lighthouse
- Wish Tree
- Lei Yue Mun Municipal Services Building (鯉魚門市政大廈)
- Lei Yue Mun Estate, a public housing estate in Yau Tong
- Domain and Lei Yue Mun Plaza, shopping malls

== Transportation ==
- Ferry: Coral Sea Shipping Services (珊瑚海船務) provides a regular service between Sam Ka Tsuen pier and Sai Wan Ho pier. Fare is HK$9 per adult.
- Bus: Kowloon Motor Bus operates circular bus route no. 14X between Sam Ka Tsuen and Tsim Sha Tsui
- Minibus: Red minibus service is available between Kwun Tong and Lei Yue Mun, and between Mong Kok and Lei Yue Mun.
- MTR: Yau Tong station (Kowloon side)

== Education ==
Lei Yue Mun is in Primary One Admission (POA) School Net 48. Within the school net are multiple aided schools (operated independently but funded with government money) and Kwun Tong Government Primary School.

Hong Kong Public Libraries maintains the Lei Yue Mun Public Library in the Lei Yue Mun Municipal Services Building.

== See also ==
- Devil's Peak, Hong Kong
- Lei Yue Mun Road
- Four hills of Kowloon
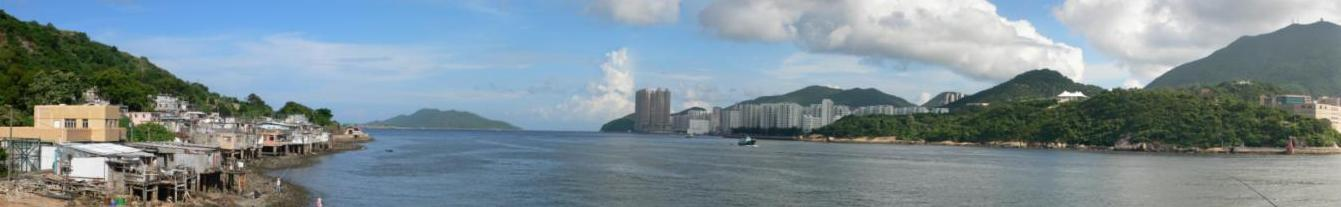
Lei Yue Mun, taken from the shore of Sam Ka Tsuen, Lei Yue Mun
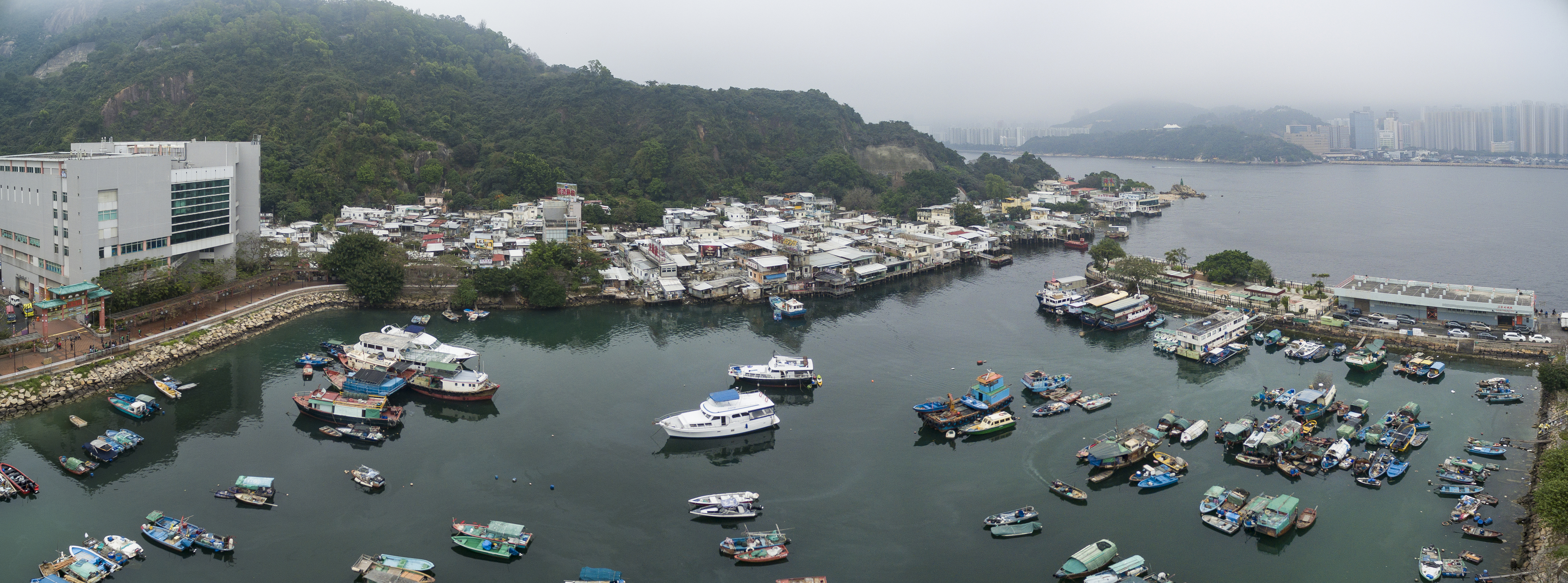
Aerial panorama of Lei Yue Mun, Kowloon
