= KMB Routes 290 and 290A =

Hong Kong bus routes

290 / 290A
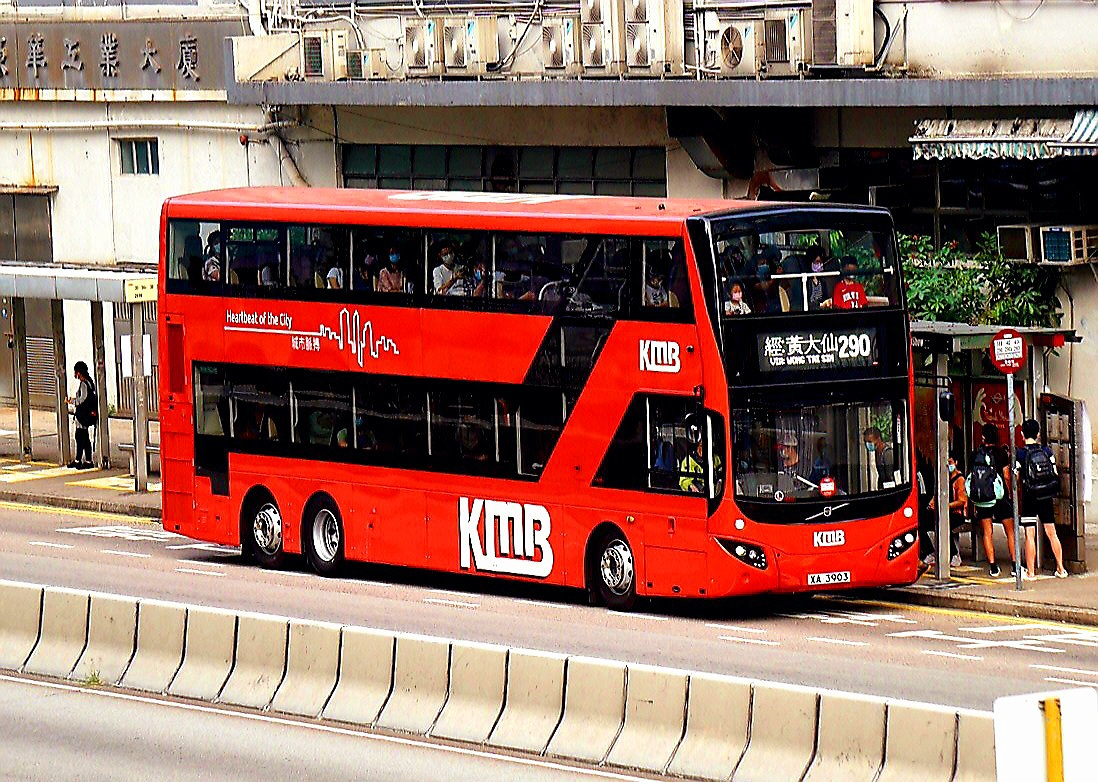
- Former used vehicle V6X22 is approaching at sun flower garden bus stop

Overview
- Operator: Kowloon Motor Bus
- Garage: Kowloon Bay (K) - Tseung Kwan O Lai Chi Kok (L) - Tsing Yi
- Vehicle: Alexander Dennis Enviro500 MMC (ATENU,3ATENU)
- Peak vehicle requirement: 21 (for both routes)

Route
- Start: Hang Hau (North) (Tseung Kwan O Hospital) (290); Tseung Kwan O (Choi Ming Estate) (290A)
- Via: Hang Hau and Po Lam; Sau Mau Ping and Sze Shun (route 290A only); Wong Tai Sin; Kwai Chung
- End: Tsuen Wan West station

Service
- Level: Daily
- Frequency: every 20 minutes for each individual route combined headway of 10-minute intervals for both routes
- Operates: 05:30 until 23:50 (290); 06:00 until 00:20 (290A)

Air-Conditioned New Territories Route No. 290 and 290A are Hong Kong bus routes operated by Kowloon Motor Bus. 290 travels between Tseung Kwan O Hospital in northern Hang Hau and Tsuen Wan West station; 290A travels between Choi Ming Estate in Tseung Kwan O and Tsuen Wan West Station

Routeings of the two routes are roughly the same, except for sections within the neighbourhoods of Sau Mau Ping and Sze Shun in Kwun Tong District, New Kowloon. Route 290 passes through without any stops in these neighbourhoods, while 290A calls at various stops along the way.

== History ==
Residents of the new town of Tseung Kwan O in New Territories East have been fighting for a direct bus connection to Kwai Chung and Tsuen Wan in New Territories West for many years, citing the reason that travelling by MTR between the two places requires a number of transfers in between. It was under such demand that the Transport Department suggested the introduction of such routes, then unnumbered and proposed to operate between Hang Hau (North) and Tsuen Wan (Nina Tower), in the 2013–2014 Bus Route Development Programme. It was put forward that the route would utilize buses spared by cancelling Cross-Harbour Bus Route 692, which suffered heavy losses in terms of profit for both the KMB and New World First Bus.

The Transport Department confirmed in June 2014 that the route would operate via Sau Ming Road in Sau Mau Ping, and tendering exercise would take place at the end of that month. Such decision sparked opposition from the Sai Kung District Council, which believed that resources spared from the district should not be used to cater for the needs of other districts like Kwun Tong.

The Government thus gave in to the council's demands and offered that the route would be amended to take a more direct routeing via Kwun Tong Bypass, so that it would not serve Sau Mau Ping.

This in turn resulted in the disapproval of Kwun Tong District Council, which threatened that actions would be taken by residents of the districts if such amendments take place.

In October 2014, the Government announced that two variants would be available for the Tseung Kwan O to Tsuen Wan bus route, one skipping the whole of Sau Mau Ping and Sze Shun and one calling at stops within the two neighbourhoods, with the total journey time of 63 and 80 minutes respectively.

Tenders were invited from the existing franchised bus operators for the operation rights of the route a month later. Transport Department confirmed in February 2015 that the then-unnumbered route was awarded to Kowloon Motor Bus, and the company started to operate the two variants, numbered 290 and 290A, on 28 March 2015.

== Fare ==
290A

From Tsuen Wan West Station: $11.3

From Beacon Heights: $9.3

From Pak Hong House Choi Wan Estate $6.6

From Anderson Road $5.4

From Choi Ming Terminus: $11.3

From Po Tat Estate: $9.3

From Lai King Estate Kwai Chong House: $6.0

290

From Hang Hau (North): $12.1

From Pak Hung House: $10.1

From Lai King Estate Kwai Chung Road: $6.5

From Tsuen Wan West Station: $12.1

From Beacon Heights: $10.1

From Pak Hung House: $7.5

Anderson Road: $5.8

== Route ==
290A

From Tseung Kwan O (Choi Ming)			From Tsuen Wan West Station		
No.	Bus Stops Name	Location	No.	Bus Stops Name	Location
1	Choi Ming	Bus Terminus	1	Tsuen Wan West Station	Bus Terminus
2	Tong Ming Street Park	Tong Ming Street	2	Tai Ho Road	
3	Tseung Kwan O Plaza	Po Yap Road	3	Chung On Street	Castle Peak Road Tsuen Wan
4	Ngan O Road		4	Tai Wo Hau BBI - Tai Wo Hau Station（A1）	Castle Peak Road Kwai Chung
5	Pui Shing Road		5	Cheung Wing Road Gyratory	Castle Peak Road Kwai Chung
6	Hau Tak Estate	Po Ning Road	6	Kwai Chun Court Kwai Chung Road	Kwai Chung Road
7	King Lam Estate	Po Lam North Road	7	Sun Kwai Hing Garden	Kwai Chung Road
8	Yan Kong Road		8	Kwai Fong Estate	Kwai Chung Road
9	Leung Kit Wah Primary School	Po Fung Road	9	Lai King Estate Kwai Chung Road	Kwai Chung Road
10	Serenity Place	Po Hong Road	10	Beacon Heights	Lung Cheung Road
11	Tsui Lam Estate	Po Lam North Road	11	Phoenix House	Lung Cheung Road
12	Hong Shing Garden	Po Lam North Road	12*	Lung Cheung Government School	Lung Cheung Road
13	Ma Yau Tong Village	Po Lam Road	13	Wong Tai Sin BBI - Wong Tai Sin Station（B5）	Lung Cheung Road
14	Po Tat BBI - Po Tat Estate（H2）	Po Lam Road	14	Ngau Chi Wan BBI - Ngau Choi Wan Village（G2）	Lung Cheung Road
15	Upper Sau Mau Ping	Hiu Kwong Street	15	Pak Hong House Choi Wan Estate	New Clear Water Bay Road
^	Upper Sau Mau Ping	Bus Terminus	16	Kei Shun School	New Clear Water Bay Road
16	Sau Fai House Sau Mau Ping Estate	Sau Ming Road	17	Lee Hong House Shun Lee Estate	Shun Lee Tsuen Road
17	Sau Fu House Sau Pau Ping Estate	Sau Ming Road	18*	On Yat House Shun On Estate	Lee On Road
18	Sau Mau Ping Shopping Centre	Sau Ming Road	19	Tin Wan House Shun Tin Estate	Shun On Road
19	Sau Lok House Sau Mau Ping Estate	Sau Ming Road	20	Sau Lok House Sau Mau Ping Estate	Sau Ming Road
20	Shun Tin	Bus Terminus	21	Sau Yat House Sau Mau Ping Estate	Sau Ming Road
21	Shun On Estate	Lee On Road	22	Sau On House Sau Mau Ping Estate	Sau Ming Road
22	Lee Yip House Shun Lee Estate	Lee On Road	23	Upper Sau Mau Ping	Hiu Kwong Street
23	Lee Hang House Shun Lee Estate	Lee On Road	24	Po Tat BBI - Po Tat Estate（N2）	Po Lam Road
24	Shun Lee Fire Station	Lee On Road	25	Anderson Road	Po Lam Road
25	Pak Hong House Choi Wan Estate	New Clear Water Bay Road	26	Ma Yau Tong Estate	Po Lam Road
26	Ngau Chi Wan BBI - Choi Hung Station (K6)	Ping Shek Terminus	27	Ma Wu Tsai	Po Lam Road
27	Ngau Chi Wan BBI - Hong Ngok House（H2）	Lung Cheung Road	28	Hong Shing Garden	Po Lam North Road
28	Wong Tai Sin BBI - Shatin Pass Road（D1）	Lung Cheung Road	29	Tsui Lam Estate	Po Lam North Road
29	Wing Kwong College	Lung Cheung Road	30	Finery Park	Po Hong Road
30	Phoenix House	Lung Cheung Road	31	Po Kim House Po Lam Estate	Po Fung Road
31	Beacon Heights	Lung Cheung Road	32	Yan King Road	
32	Lai King Estate Kwai Chung Road	Kwai Chung Road	33	King Lam Estate	Po Lam North Road
33	Kwai Fong Plaza	Kwai Chung Road	34	Hau Tak Estate	Po Ning Road
34	Kwong Fai Circuit	Kwai Chung Road	35	Chung Wa Road	
35	Kin Tsuen Street	Caste Peak Road Kwai Chung	36	Yuk Ming Court	Ngan O Road
36	Tai Wo Hau BBI - Tai Wo Hau Station (B2)	Caste Peak Road Kwai Chung	37	Bauhinia Garden	Po Yap Road
37	Chung On Street	Castle Peak Road Tsuen Wan	38	Tseung Kwan O Station	Tong Chun Street
38	Tai Ho Road		39	Tong Ming Street Park	Tong Ming Street
39	Tsuen Wan West Station	Bus Terminus	40	Choi Fu House Choi Ming Court	King Leng Road
			41	Choi Ming	Bus Terminus

290

From Hang Hau (North)			From Tsuen Wan West Station		
No.	Bus Stop Name	Location	No.	Bus Stops Name	Location
1	Hang Hau (North)	Bus Terminus	1	Tsuen Wan West Station	Bus Terminus
2	Chung Wa Road	Chung Wa Road	2	Tai Ho Road Tsuen Wan	Tai Ho Road
3	Pui Shing Road	Pui Shing Road	3	Chung On Street	Castle Peak Road Tsuen Wan
4	Hau Tak Estate	Po Ning Road	4	Tai Wo Hau BBI - Tai Wo Hau Station (A1)	Castle Peak Road Tsuen Wan
5	King Lam Estate	Po Lam Road North	5	Cheung Wing Road Gyratory	Castle Peak Road Kwai Chung
6	Yan King Road	Yan King Road	6	Kwai Chun Court Kwai Chung Road	
7	Leung Kit Wah Primary School	Po Fung Road		7	Sun Kwai Hing Garden
8	Serenity Place	Po Hong Road	8	Kwai Chung Road	Kwai Fong Estate
9	Tsui Lam Estate	Po Lam North Road	11	Kwai Chung Road	Lai King Estate Kwai Chung Road
10	Hong Sing Garden	Po Lam Road North	12	Lung Cheung Road	Beacon Heights
11	Ma Yau Tong Village	Po Lam Road	13	Lung Cheung Road	Phoenix House
12	Po Tat BBI - Po Tat Estate (H2)	Po Lam Road	14	Lung Cheung Road	Wong Tai Sing BBI - Wong Tai Sin Temple
13	Pak Hong House Choi Wan Estate	New Clear Water Bay Road	26	Lung Cheung Road	Ngau Chi Wan BBI - Ngau Chi Wan Village
14	Ping Shek Terminus	Ngau Chi Wan BBI - Choi Hung Station (K6)	27	New Clear Water Bay Road	Pak Hung House
15	Ngau Chi Wan BBI - Hong Ngok House (H2)	Lung Cheung Road	28	Po Lam Road	Po Tat BBI - Po Tat Estate (N2)
16	Wong Tai Sin BBI - Shatin Pass Road (D1)	Lung Cheung Road	29	Po Lam Road	Anderson Road
17	Phoenix House	Lung Cheung Road	31	Po Lam Road	Ma Yau Tong Village
18	Beacon Heights	Lung Cheung Road	32	Po Lam Road	Mau Wu Tsai
19	Lai King Estate Kwai Chung Road	Kwai Chung Road	33	Po Lam Road North	Hong Sing Garden
20	Kwai Fong Plaza	Kwai Chung Road	34	Po Lam Road North	Tsui Lam Estate
21	Kwong Fai Circuit	Kwai Chung Road	35	Po Hong Road	Finery Park
22	Kin Tsuen Street	Caste Peak Road Kwai Chung	36	Po Fung Road	Po Kim House
23	Tai Wo Hau BBI - Tai Wo Hau Station (B2)	Caste Peak Road Kwai Chung	37	Yan King Road	Yan King Road
24	Chung On Street	Castle Peak Road Tsuen Wan	38	Po Lam Road North	King Lam Estate
25	Tai Ho Road Tsuen Wan	Tai Ho Road	39	Po Ning Road	Hau Tak Estate
26	Tsuen Wan West Station	Bus Terminus	40	Chung Wa Road	Chung Wa Road
			42	Pui Shing Road	Pui Shing Road
			43	Po Ning Road	Fu Ning Garden
			41	Bus Terminus	Hang Hau (North) (Tseung Kwan O Hospital)

The routings of 290 and 290A differ in Sau Mau Ping and Sze Shun. Between Po Tat Estate and Choi Wan Estate, route 290 adopts a direct routing via Sau Mau Ping Road and Shun Lee Tsuen Road, bypassing and not making any stop at the two public housing estates; route 290A enters and makes stops at both Sau Mau Ping and the Sze Shun area, operating via Sau Ming Road, Shun On Road and Lee On Road.

== Bus Interchange ==
Like other routes operated by KMB, this route offers a set of bus-bus interchange fare reductions. These fare reductions are applicable for passengers changing from 290 or 290A to other bus routes in Choi Hung, Choi Wan, Wong Tai Sin and Tsuen Wan. This interchange scheme is also applicable to interchanging with routes operated by Long Win Bus in the Tsuen Wan and Kwai Chung section, as well as NR331 and NR331S, which are non-franchised bus routes providing transportation to Park Island, of which both are operated by Sun Bus.

== Vehicles ==
This route uses 36 buses.

Vehicles used in routes 290 and 290A
Fleet number	License plate number of the bus	Depot	Remarks
ATENU85	SF3707	Teueng Kwan O Depot (K)	Serves this route full day
ATENU821	TV3510	Teueng Kwan O Depot (K)	Serves this route full day
ATENU999	UB8122	Teueng Kwan O Depot (K)	Serves this route full day
ATENU1232	UU2854	Teueng Kwan O Depot (K)	Serves this route full day
ATENU1235	UU4207	Teueng Kwan O Depot (K)	Serves this route full day
ATENU1236	UU4341	Teueng Kwan O Depot (K)	Serves this route full day
ATENU1237	UU3857	Teueng Kwan O Depot (K)	Only serves this route on peak hours
ATENU1425	VL4763	Teueng Kwan O Depot (K)	Serves this route full day
ATENU1427	VL5753	Teueng Kwan O Depot (K)	Serves this route full day
ATENU1435	VL694	Teueng Kwan O Depot (K)	Serves this route full day
ATENU1438	VL7098	Teueng Kwan O Depot (K)	Extra bus
ATENU1469	VM5491	Teueng Kwan O Depot (K)	Only serves this route on peak hours
ATENU1472	VM5663	Teueng Kwan O Depot (K)	Serves this route full day
ATENU1496	VN2313	Teueng Kwan O Depot (K)	Only serves this route on peak hours
ATENU1517	VP8980	Teueng Kwan O Depot (K)	Serves this route full day
ATENU1518	VP9099	Teueng Kwan O Depot (K)	Serves this route full day
ATENU1519	VP9485	Teueng Kwan O Depot (K)	Serves this route full day
ATENU1521	VR270	Teueng Kwan O Depot (K)	Only serves this route on peak hours
ATENU1522	VP9226	Teueng Kwan O Depot (K)	Serves this route full day
ATENU1523	VR147	Teueng Kwan O Depot (K)	Serves this route full day
ATENU1549	VR4151	Teueng Kwan O Depot (K)	Serves this route full day
ATENU1550	VR6208	Teueng Kwan O Depot (K)	Serves this route full day
ATENU1594	VS4191	Teueng Kwan O Depot (K)	Serves this route full day
ATENU1597	VS4448	Teueng Kwan O Depot (K)	Serves this route full day
3ATENU102	UF4283	Teueng Kwan O Depot (K)	Serves this route full day
3ATENU108	UF5597	Teueng Kwan O Depot (K)	Serves this route full day
3ATENU116	UF7898	Teueng Kwan O Depot (K)	Serves this route full day
ATENU1000	UB8222	Kowloon Bay Depot (K)	Extra bus
ATENU665	TP3362	Tsing Yi Depot (L)	Serves this route full day
ATENU671	TP5332	Tsing Yi Depot (L)	Serves this route full day
ATENU672	TP6099	Tsing Yi Depot (L)	Serves this route full day
3ATENU91	UE9290	Tsing Yi Depot (L)	Serves this route full day
3ATENU152	UE9558	Tsing Yi Depot (L)	Serves this route full day
3ATENU148	UJ1646	Lai Chi Kok Depot	Serves this route full day
3ATENU195	VR5799}	Lai Chi Kok Depot	Serves this route full day
3ATENU197	VR6564	Lai Chi Kok Depot	Serves this route full day

== Previous route 290 in Hong Kong ==
Prior to the introduction of the current route 290, the same number has been applied to a Rennie's Mill – Choi Hung route operated during between 1989 and 1996. Rennie's Mill is the name of Tiu Keng Leng before the area was incorporated into the Tseung Kwan O New Town.

Coincidentally, the routeings of the 1989–1996 and 2015- versions of 290 are the same between Ma Yau Tong Village and Choi Hung station.

== See also ==
- List of bus routes in Hong Kong
