= Hiu Lai (constituency) =

Hong Kong constituency

- Elected constituency for the Kwun Tong District Council
- Boundary of Hiu Lai in Kwun Tong District
- District: Kwun Tong
- Legislative Council constituency: Kowloon East
- Population: 17,379 (2019)
- Electorate: 12,271 (2019)

Current constituency
- Created: 1999
- Number of members: One
- Member: Wilson Cheung Man-fung (Independent)

Hiu Lai
- Traditional Chinese: 曉麗
Transcriptions
Yue: Cantonese
- Yale Romanization: Híu Laih
- Jyutping: Hiu2 lai6

Hiu Lai is one of the 37 constituencies in the Kwun Tong District of Hong Kong which was created in 1999.

The constituency loosely covers Hiu Lai Court in Sau Mau Ping and has an estimated population of 17,379.

== Councillors represented ==
Election	Member	Party
1999	So Lai-chun	Independent
2019	Wilson Cheung Man-fung	Independent

== Election results ==
=== 2010s ===
Kwun Tong District Council Election, 2019: Hiu Lai
Party	Candidate	Votes	%	±%
Nonpartisan	Wilson Cheung Man-fung	5,470	60.02	
Independent	So Lai-chun	3,644	39.98	−20.30
Majority		1,826	20.04	
Turnout		9,138	74.49	
Nonpartisan gain from Independent		Swing		

Kwun Tong District Council Election, 2015: Hiu Lai
Party	Candidate	Votes	%	±%
Independent	So Lai-chun	3,466	60.28	−5.40
Independent	Bonhoeffer Fung Kwok-keung	2,284	39.72	
Majority		1,182	20.56	
Turnout		5,750	48.62	
Independent hold		Swing		

Kwun Tong District Council Election, 2011: Hiu Lai
Party	Candidate	Votes	%	±%
Independent	So Lai-chun	3,210	65.68	−3.49
Independent	Li Kong-sang	1,677	34.32	+3.49
Majority		1,533	23.76	
Turnout		4,887	42.51	
Independent hold		Swing		

=== 2000s ===
Kwun Tong District Council Election, 2007: Hiu Lai
Party	Candidate	Votes	%	±%
Independent	So Lai-chun	3,257	69.17	−2.21
Independent	Li Kong-sang	1,452	20.83	
Majority		1,805	48.34	
Independent hold		Swing		

Kwun Tong District Council Election, 2003: Hiu Lai
Party	Candidate	Votes	%	±%
Independent	So Lai-chun	3,819	71.38	+9.90
Independent	Lo Yin-fun	1,531	28.62	
Majority		2,288	42.76	
Independent hold		Swing		

=== 1990s ===
Kwun Tong District Council Election, 1999: Hiu Lai
Party	Candidate	Votes	%	±%
Independent	So Lai-chun	2,965	61.48	
Democratic	So Ka-ho	1,858	38.52	
Majority		1,107	22.96	
Independent win (new seat)				
