= Aggressive Construction industrial accidents =

The Aggressive Construction industrial accidents were a series of industrial incidents that occurred between 2020 and 2023, involving Aggressive Construction Engineering Limited (精進建築有限公司; Short: Aggressive Engineering) and Aggressive Construction Company Limited (精進建築工程有限公司; Short: Aggressive Construction), both subsidiaries of the Great Harvest Group (興聯集團). These accidents resulted in a total of six fatalities.

== Background ==
Aggressive Engineering and Aggressive Construction are general building contractors under the Great Harvest Group. Their scope of work includes land excavation and lateral support engineering, site formation, construction, building and interior decoration works, mechanical and electrical engineering, exterior wall finishing works, outdoor landscaping, and estate road works, among others.

== Industrial accidents ==
Between 2020 and 2023, multiple industrial accidents occurred at the construction sites of Aggressive Engineering and Aggressive Construction, resulting in a total of 6 deaths and 8 injuries.

- On 20 July 2020, a 24-year-old worker was electrocuted at an Aggressive Construction site for Hong Kong Post Building on Wang Chin Street, Kowloon Bay.
- On 27 July 2020, a No. 3 alarm fire broke out at an Aggressive Engineering site for private estate Seacoast Royale on Castle Peak Road, Tuen Mun, no one was harmed.
- In September 2021, a crane collapsed at the same Seacoast Royale site on Castle Peak Road, Tuen Mun, no one was harmed.
- On 7 September 2022, a 65-tonne tower crane collapsed at an Aggressive Engineering site on Anderson Road, Sau Mau Ping, killing 3 and injuring 6.
- On 14 December 2022, a 55-year-old worker was crushed to death by a H-beam at an Aggressive Engineering site on Tung Yuen Street, Yau Tong,
- On 10 October 2023, a 56-year-old electrician died on Tuesday after falling while installing cables at an Aggressive Construction site for a Fire Services Department project on To Wah Road, Yau Ma Tei.
- On 24 October 2023, a worker injured after falling 1 meter into the ground at the same site on Anderson Road that a crane had collapsed and killed 3.
- On 27 October 2023, another worker injured after falling at the site of a University of Hong Kong dormitory project on Pok Fu Lam Road.

== Prosecution and suspension ==
The Labour Department (勞工處) has filed charges regarding the industrial accident at the Kowloon Bay construction site in 2020. Four companies have been fined between HK$13,000 and HK$59,000.

Between 15 and 18 December 2022, the Labour Department conducted a special operation, inspecting 13 sites managed by Aggressive Construction. As a result, 55 improvement notices were issued, and 21 charges were filed.

On 18 October 2023, the Development Bureau (發展局) announced that Aggressive Engineering would not have its license renewed due to involvement in multiple industrial accidents. As a result, Aggressive Engineering will be removed from the "General Building Contractors List" effective 16 November, and three of the company's authorized representatives—Chow Kai Pong, Law Chu Wa, and Leung Hong Kit—will have their licenses revoked. This suspension will impact five development projects.

Similarly, the registration for Aggressive Construction, a subsidiary of Great Harvest Group, expired in April 2023. As of October 2023, the license renewal application is still being processed by the Buildings Department. Additionally, the license for Aggressive Engineering Limited (精進營造有限公司), another subsidiary of Great Harvest Group, will expire at the end of December 2023.

Furthermore, four companies and four individuals are facing prosecution in connection with the crane collapse at the Anderson Road site. A hearing is scheduled for 30 January 2024.

== Further incidents ==
=== HKU Dormitory Concrete Quality Controversy ===
In July 2023, Jason Poon Chuk-hung, Chairman of Chinat Monitor (中科監察), raised concerns about the construction quality of the University of Hong Kong's Pok Fu Lam West Campus Redevelopment Project on online platforms. He alleged that some of the key structural beams and columns exhibited honeycomb-like voids within the concrete, suggesting possible flaws in the construction process. Poon also posted photos on social media to support his claims, which drew public attention.

The main contractor, Aggressive Engineering (精進建築), later issued a statement denying Poon's allegations. The company claimed that the photos he shared were outdated and did not reflect the current condition of the site. They accused Poon of making misleading statements that damaged the company's reputation and filed a defamation lawsuit in the High Court, demanding compensation, removal of the related videos, and a public apology.

In response, Poon stood by his statements, insisting they were based on factual evidence, and refused to apologize. He mentioned the possibility of taking legal countermeasures. According to Poon, the photos were provided by engineers working on-site and reflected problems that had persisted for months. He also noted that HKU had previously received multiple advisory letters highlighting construction defects, indicating the university was already aware of the issues.

=== Corruption scandal ===
After Aggressive Engineering was removed from the list, the five projects it was involved in have all been transferred to Superb Interior Contracting Company Limited (卓越天工有限公司). According to the company registry, Superb Interior Contracting, Aggressive Construction Engineering, Aggressive Construction, and their parent company, Great Harvest Group, were all registered at the same office address. Superb Interior Contracting also shares some directors with Aggressive Construction Engineering and Aggressive Construction.

The "Starter Homes" Pilot Scheme for Hong Kong Residents (港人首次置業計劃) project on Anderson Road, originally contracted to Aggressive Engineering, was taken over by Superb Interior Contracting after Aggressive Engineering was delisted. On 3 October 2024, the government addressed media reports about a building on the site lacking at least four steel bars. The Buildings Department stated that after receiving a report about the issue in late August, they followed up in September and confirmed the missing steel bars.

In May 2025, the Independent Commission Against Corruption (ICAC) arrested 10 individuals involved in the case, including an employee of the main contractor and five supervisors from subcontractors. The investigation revealed that the steel reinforcement in all six buildings on the site did not comply with the approved plans, showing serious violations.
