= Po Tat Estate =

Housing estate in Sau Mau Ping, Hong Kong

Coordinates: 22.3175°N 114.2381°E

- Chinese: 寶達邨
- Cantonese Yale: bóu daaht chyūn
Transcriptions
Yue: Cantonese
- Yale Romanization: bóu daaht chyūn
- Jyutping: bou2 daat6 cyun1

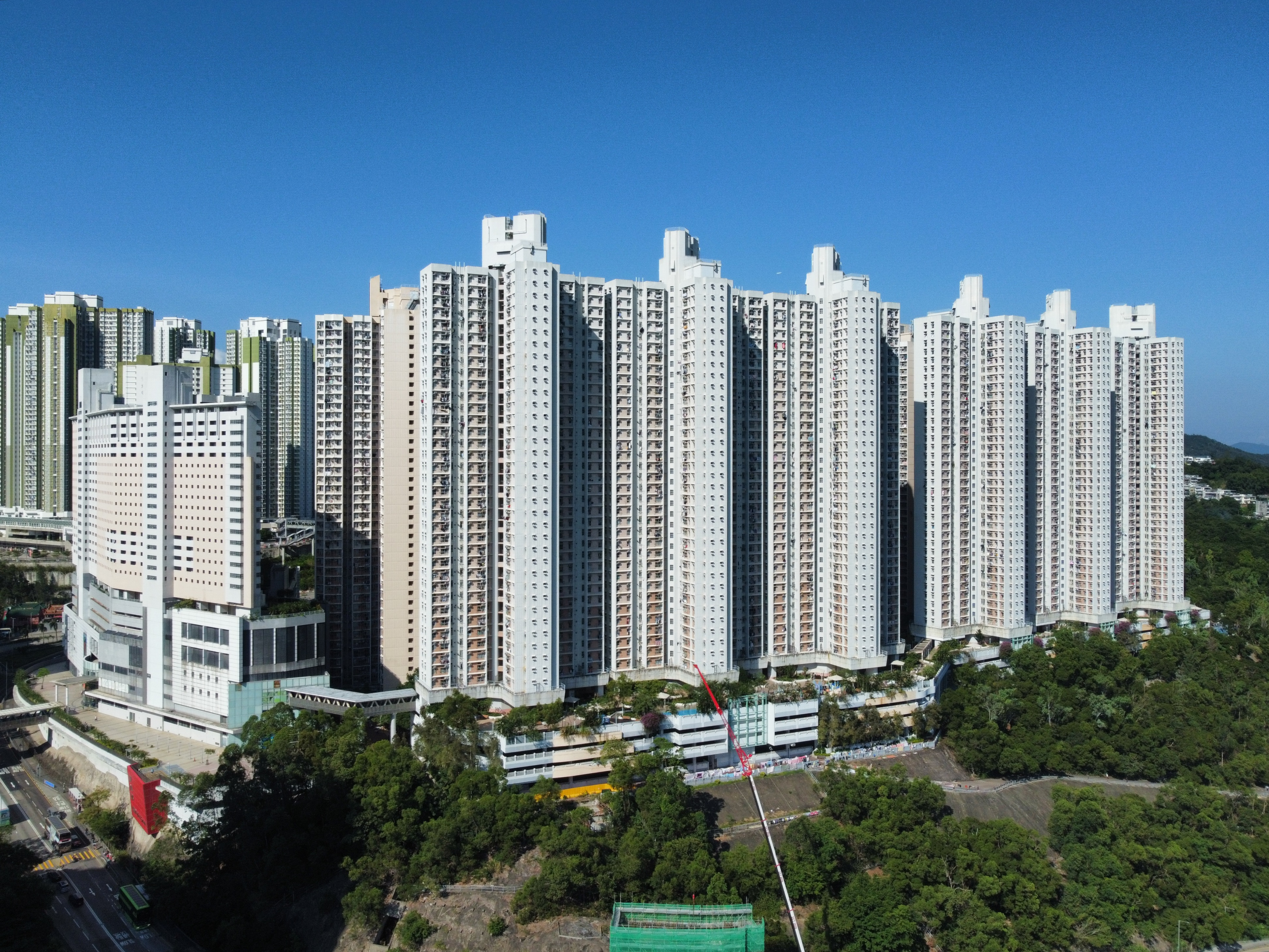
Po Tat Estate

Po Tat Estate (Chinese: 寶達邨), formerly called Po Lam Road Housing Development (Chinese: 寶琳路房屋發展), is a public housing estate at the junction of Po Lam Road and Sau Mau Ping Road in Sau Mau Ping, Kwun Tong, Kowloon, Hong Kong, near Sau Mau Ping Estate and Tseung Kwan O Tunnel. It consists of 13 blocks and a shopping centre. In 2016, it housed a population of 24,642.

A Monkey God Temple is located at Po Tat Estate. The Monkey King Festival is celebrated there.

== Background ==
Before Po Tat Estate was constructed, the site was a cement plant and part of the Anderson Road and Po Lam Road were laid on there. Its Phase 1, 2 and 4 consists of 6 blocks and a shopping centre completed in 2001. Another six blocks originally belonged to a HOS estate, Hiu Lam Court (Chinese: 曉琳苑), but they were transferred to rental housing and occupied in 2003.

== Houses ==
Name (Block no.)	Type	Completion
Tat Hong House (Block 2)	Harmony 1 Option 6 (Late third Gen.)	2001
Tat Fu House (Block 3)	Harmony 1 Option 6 (Late third Gen.)	2001
Tat Chui House (Block 5)	Harmony 1 Option 6 (Late third Gen.)	2001
Tat Yan House (Block 6)	Harmony 1 Option 6 (Late third Gen.)	2001
Tat Yi House (Block 7)	Harmony 1 Option 6 (Late third Gen.)	2001
Tat Fung House (Block 4)	Harmony 1 Option 10 (Late third Gen.)	2001
Tat Cheung House (Block 1)	Small Household Block	2001
Tat Hei House (Block A)	New Cruciform (Ver.1999)	2003
Tat Shun House (Block B)	New Cruciform (Ver.1999)	2003
Tat Kai House (Block C)	New Cruciform (Ver.1999)	2003
Tat Hin House (Block D)	New Cruciform (Ver.1999)	2003
Tat Kwai House (Block E)	New Cruciform (Ver.1999)	2003
Tat On House (Block F)	New Cruciform (Ver.1999)	2003

== Demographics ==
In the 2016 by-census, Po Tat Estate recorded a population of 24,642. There were 7,391 households and an average household size of 3.3 persons.

== Transport ==
At present, residents of Po Tat Estate are reliant on road transport, primarily buses and minibuses. In the future, a new station of the Mass Transit Railway (MTR) may be built at the estate under the East Kowloon line concept, which was proposed by the Transport and Housing Bureau in the Railway Development Strategy 2014. That document suggested that the new railway line may be built between 2019 and 2025.
