= Sau Mau Ping gang murder =

1997 murder in Hong Kong

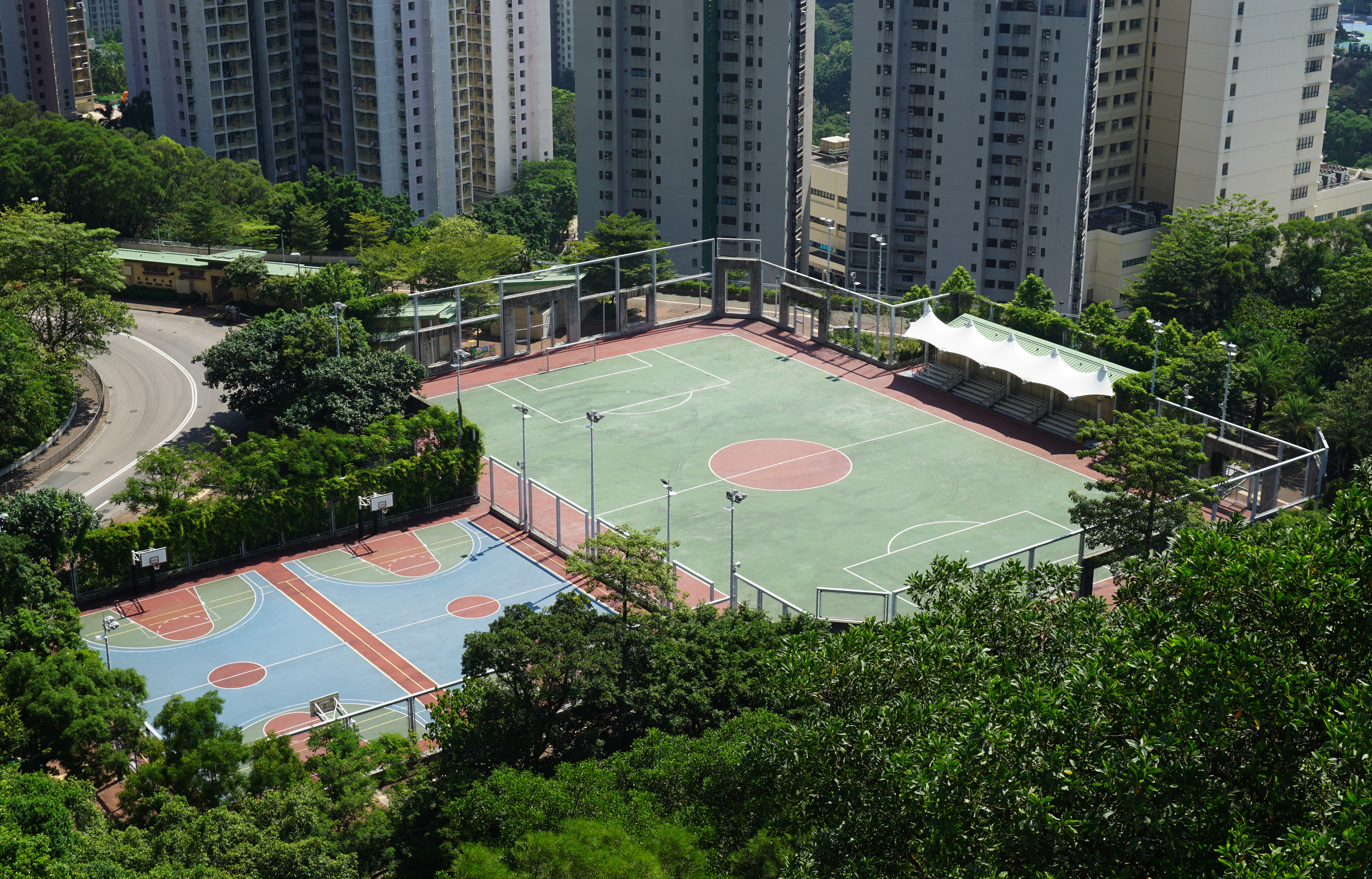
- Sau Ming Road Park (pictured) opened up after Block 39 of Sau Mau Ping Estate, where the murder happened, was demolished
- Location: Sau Mau Ping Estate, Kwun Tong, Hong Kong
- Date: 14 May 1997; 29 years ago
- Weapons: Belt; Iron pipes; Broomsticks; Wooden poles; Umbrella; Folding stools
- Deaths: 1 (Luk Chi-wai)
- Injuries: 1 (Chan Muk-ching)
- Assailant: Local juvenile gang
- Accused: 14
- Verdict: 13 convicted, 1 pleaded guilty
- Convictions: Murder; Battery; Grievous bodily harm; Preventing lawful burial of body
- Case number: HCCC 433/97 & 8/98

The Sau Mau Ping gang murder (Yue Chinese: 秀茂坪童黨燒屍案, lit. 'Corpse burning by Sau Mau Ping juvenile gang') is a Hong Kong torture-murder case happened in 1997 in which a 16-year-old teenager died following assaults by a group of 14 of his "brothers", aged between 14 and 17, who later also burnt the corpse and hid it in rubbish.

Six were convicted of murder in the lower court, making this the largest group of underage murderers. This remains one of the most notorious teen gang attacks, and raised awareness on youth lawlessness.

== Background ==
Sau Mau Ping Estate, a public housing estate housing 45 crowded tenement blocks at its peak, was first built in the 1960s and managed by the Housing Authority. Starting from the 1990s, the estate was gradually rebuilt. Block 39, where the gang murdered the teen, was included in the redevelopment plan in 1997, and hence most of the flats had been vacated.

Sau Mau Ping in general which the Sau Mau Ping Estate is situated in had (& in many ways still have) a reputation of being a low-income troubled area in isolated Kwun Tong in northeast Hong Kong which at the time was populated by many poor low-income foreign workers such as Thais; many of whom face discrimination. Many of the gang members involved had ethnic Thai mothers and were of mixed Thai/HK-Chinese ethnicities. The family background of the boys in the gang who were involved were of parents that took up multiple full time unskilled labour jobs (i.e: construction worker, waiter/waitress, etc.) of meager wage combined and had little time to parent their children; some even saw their child entering gangs positively as means to avoid bullying by other kids in the area.

In school, the profile of the boys in the gang were known to receive poor grades in school, were often bored, & were usually idle outside of school be it at home or the streets. Many of the youth in that area including the boys in the gang were also known to be big consumers of the Teddy Boy (古惑仔) comic series which when the news of the murder broke, many speculated & even blamed the consumption of that comic book series to have given the boys a romanticized view of the triad and gang life. The boys in the gang were known to get involved in petty crimes such as shoplifting, looting, and street brawls with other kids & gangs that the other kids formed.

== Attack ==
The teens accused and the victims were residents of Sau Mau Ping Estate, usually gathered at a youth centre in the estate or the flat of 30-year-old "No. 3 Uncle" Chan Muk-ching (陳木清, "三叔"), a janitor nicknamed "Third Uncle" who was bullied by the gang due to his mild intellectual disability. Luk Chi-wai (陸志偉), or "Chicken" (阿雞), a 16-year-old boy, repeatedly encouraged Chan to go to the police.

Angered by what they saw as a betrayal, the gang lured Luk to Chan's flat (Flat 1508 of Block 39) at night to "severely punish" him, who was, according to the prosecutor in the later trial, subjected to a succession of vicious beatings, extremes of physical violence, torture and ill-treatment by the defendants individually and jointly, until his health and physical resistance irrevocably broke down.

Luk was punched, kicked, whipped with a buckled leather belt, held upside down, swung around the room, and beaten with iron water pipes, plastic broomsticks, wooden poles, an umbrella and folding stools. He was forced to kneel before Guan Yu's statute and read aloud triad's mottos, before the gang assaulted him one by one and forced him to eat cigarettes butts. Chairs were stacked on him, and later his head was being bumped into the wall and onto the floor. The assailants poured freezing water on fainted Luk to awaken him, who begged for a stop but was ignored.

Luk suffered serious injuries and passed out after almost three hours. The gang finally attempted to save him but failed, leaving him to his own death at around midnight. Attempting to cover up the murder, the teenagers threatened Chan not to tell on them, while packing Luk's body into a cardboard box. After moving the box to the vacated Block 32, the juveniles covered the body with sulphuric acid and set alight with paraffin and newspapers. They later return to the site and burnt the corpse again. The body was hidden in rubbish and disposed at the trash point.

Also abused by the gang, Chan went to a hospital for medical treatment, where the police discovered his suspicious injuries. The case was eventually uncovered following a police investigation, and 14 were arrested in the ensuing two weeks. The police tried to recover the body of Luk in a landfill in Ta Kwu Ling, which they believe was dumped there, but was never found except for a few bone fragments.

== Trial and appeal ==
Ten teenage boys and three girls went on trial in September 1998 at the Court of First Instance for killing Luk Chi-wai. They all deny the charge of murder.

The defense cited a professor at University of Hong Kong and argued that the youths did not intend to kill anyone and regret their brutality. The lawyer claimed they were deceived by violent scenes in films and cartoons that their tortures were not lethal. The prosecution however did not accept a plea deal of manslaughter and insisted on pursuing murder charges, describing the torture as "brutal and inhumane cruelty". The defense then sought for a more non-life imprisonment from the judge, which could be granted to those who were underage.

Following a year-long trial, the 9-member jury convicted 6 defendants with murder in January 1999. The group appeared shocked as the verdicts were announced. Presiding judge Michael Wong Kin-chow (王見秋) said instead of instant kill by stabbing or shooting, the defendants tortured Luk in various ways for three hours until he died in grave pain, which proved their intent to murder by grievous bodily harm. Wong conceded that imprisoning teenagers were tragic, but he would be acting in contrary if not handing down verdicts proportionate to the horrendous and serious nature of this torture-murder.

In a courtroom packed with weeping families and friends, Hui Chi-wai, nicknamed "Sweet Potato" (番薯), Ng Ming-chun, Chan Tak-ming, and Fu Hin-chun were sentenced to life imprisonment. Denouncing the "horrific, brutal and vicious" nature of the case, justice Wong declined to use any of his discretion and said he would not pity them, just as they did not sympathise with Luk when he was dying and under their murderous attack. The other two convicted with murder were jailed for 23 and 26 years as the judge considered their limited involvement and young age respectively.

Five other gang members were found guilty of grievous bodily harm or other less serious offences, and had been remanded in custody for 21 months. In the verdict, justice Wong said he did not wish to further sanction the teens and decided to release them immediately, adding that they should thank the jury for acquitting their murder charges, and to the prosecutors for giving them a way out. Yuen Kit-yee, who the attorney said was under the influence of her boyfriend Ng Ming-chun, and Wong Shi-shing, who tried to stop others torturing Luk Chi-wai, were sentenced to training centre for their limited involvement.

Shek Tsz-kin, who testified for the prosecution against other defendants, was praised by Wong for fully cooperating with the police. The judge said he believed the prosecution witness felt genuinely remorseful for his actions, and encouraged him to reform himself. He was sentenced to 7 years in prison after admitting manslaughter and preventing lawful burial under a guilty plea.

"This is a very tragic case, tragic that an innocent young boy lost his life and tragic that a number of young men are going to lose their liberty for a long, long time."

— Michael Wong Kin-chow, High Court judge

Wong made an impassioned plea for society to learn from the tragedy, urging parents and the authorities to curb an undercurrent of youth violence.

The six convicted murders successfully appealed in 2001 on the grounds that the original rulings were "manifestly excessive", despite the court reaffirming life sentences on youngsters. The justices overturned Mak Ka-ho's murder conviction and reduced his jail term to seven years for substituted conviction of grievous bodily harm. Wong Kam-po was commuted to 19-years in prison, and Ng Ming-chun to 25-years. Justice Wong assigned a minimum term for Hui, Chan, and Fu which permitted them to lodge an appeal of sentencing only after serving the minimum term. While admitting his oversight, Michael Wong insisted that "bodies would scatter everywhere" without deterrent sanctions, and a civilised society would never allow such barbaric acts. He defended the sentences as heavy prices necessary for their actions.

	Defendant		Age	Charges (Verdict, jury decision if any)	Sentencing
1	Hui Chi-wai	許智偉	17	Murder (convicted, 9–0); Prevent lawful burial (pleaded guilty)	Life imprisonment Minimum sentence of 22 years after appeal
2	Hui Chi-yung	許智勇	14	Murder (acquitted, 1–8); Grievous bodily harm (convicted, 9–0); Preventing lawful burial (acquitted, 2–7)	Immediately released after remanded for 21 months
3	Mak Ka-ho	麥家豪	17	Murder (convicted, 8–1); Preventing lawful burial (convicted, 9–0)	26-year imprisonment 7-year imprisonment after appeal reversed murder conviction with grievous bodily harm
4	Ng Ming-chun	吳明俊	16	Murder (convicted, 7–2); Prevent lawful burial (pleaded guilty)	Life imprisonment 25-year imprisonment after appeal
5	Yuen Kit-yee	阮潔儀	14	Murder (acquitted, 0–9); Battery (convicted, 9–0); Preventing lawful burial (convicted, 9–0)	Sentenced to training centre for 16 months
6	Chan Tak-ming	陳德明	16	Murder (convicted, 8–1); Prevent lawful burial (pleaded guilty)	Life imprisonment Minimum sentence of 20 years after appeal
7	Lau Pui-yi	劉佩儀	14	Murder (acquitted, 0–9); Battery (convicted, 9–0)	Immediately released after remanded for 21 months
8	Wong Kam-po	黃金寶	14	Murder (convicted, 7–2); Prevent lawful burial (pleaded guilty)	23-year imprisonment 19-year imprisonment after appeal
9	Chow Chun	周俊	14	Murder (acquitted, 2-7); Grievous bodily harm (convicted, 8–1)	Immediately released after remanded for 21 months
10	Fu Hin-chun	傅顯進	17	Murder (convicted, 9–0); Preventing lawful burial (convicted, 9–0)	Life imprisonment Minimum sentence of 22 years after appeal
11	Chan Hang-kau	陳肯構	15	Murder (acquitted, 0–9); Battery (convicted, 7–2)	Immediately released after remanded for 21 months
12	Lo Kwai-fan	羅桂芬	14	Murder (acquitted, 0–9); Battery (convicted, 8–1)	Immediately released after remanded for 21 months
13	Wong Shi-shing	黃詩城	14	Murder (acquitted, 2–7); Manslaughter (convicted, 7–2)	Sentenced to training centre for 16 months
*	Shek Tsz-kin	石子健	16	Manslaughter (pleaded guilty); Prevent lawful burial (pleaded guilty)	7-year imprisonment

== Aftermath ==
Rod Broadhurst, criminology lecturer at the University of Hong Kong, urged the government to launch an in inquiry into the torture as this bullying behaviour may be common in schools and communities. He also said the cover-up of the murder was shocking in its sophistication.

Deputy education secretary Raymond Young acknowledged that the "outmoded, inflexible" banding system, which relegates one in five children to a substratum, was a factor in the death of Luk that fostered an anti-establishment student subculture.

The murder featured in contemporary television programmes and film. Prime-time programmes of two broadcasting stations, Hong Kong Today of ATV and Focus on Focus of TVB, covered the murder before trial and was slammed by the authorities for likely prejudicing a fair trial. It was reenacted in 1999 horror movie Street Kids Violence, starring Jones Soong Pounh-chong (as Fu Hin-chun), Lam Tsz-sin (as Shek Tsz-kin), Lee Kin-yan (as Chan Muk-ching), Astrid Chan, and others. The film is considered one of the classic cult movies in Hong Kong and remains popular as memes.

It is rumoured that all the other defendants had already been released with the exception of 2nd in command "Sweet Potato" who may have died of lung cancer in jail. On Christmas Day in 2007, leaving a note of "unhappy", Lau Pui-yee jumped to death in Shun Tin Estate, near Sau Mau Ping Estate, after losing her job and breaking up with her partner.

== In popular culture ==
=== Film ===
- The 1999 Hong Kong film Street Kids Violence (三五成群) depicts this event.

== External readings ==
- HKSAR v Hui Chi Wai & Others [2001] HKCA 216, [2001] HKCA 218, [2001] HKCA 219 (On appeal)
