= Tai Sheung Tok =

Tai Sheung Tok, Hong Kong
- 大上托
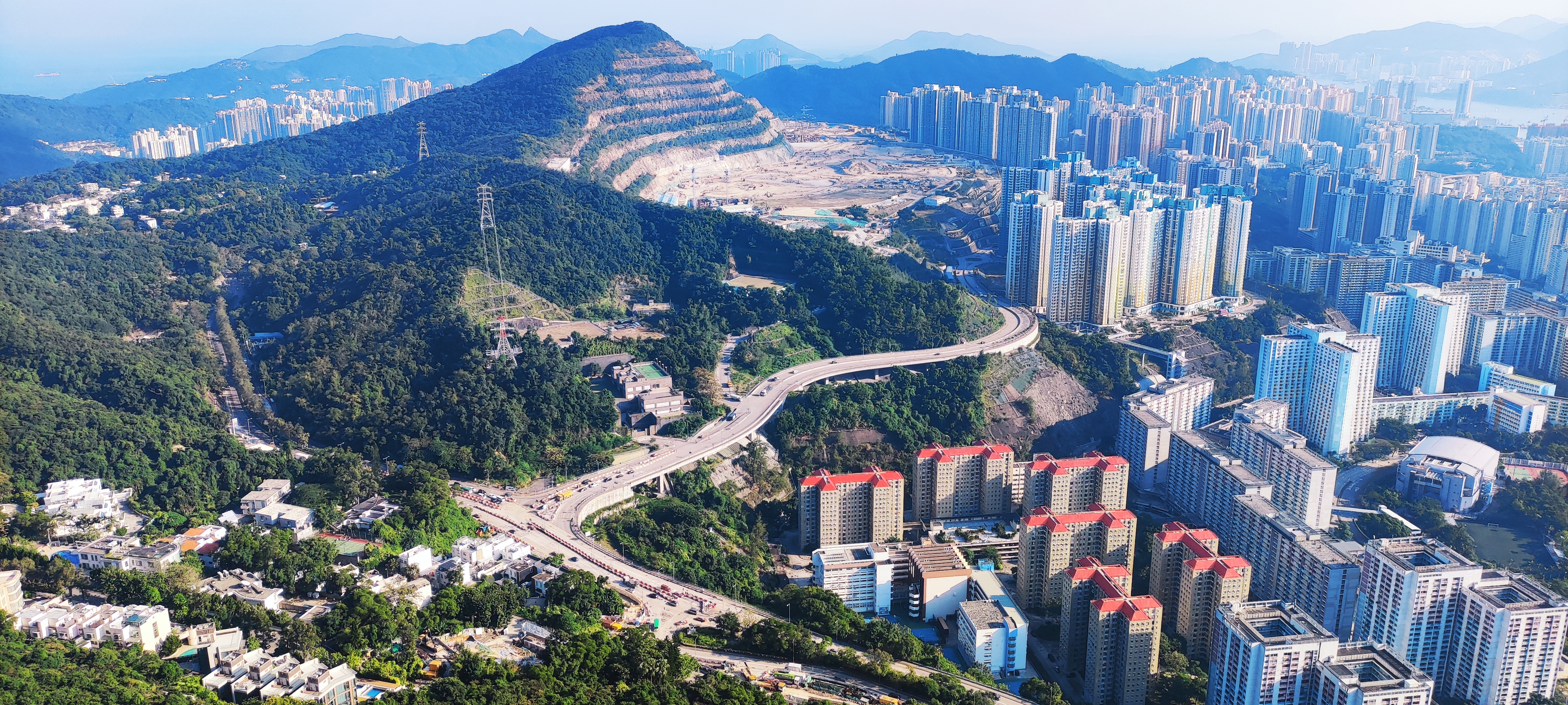
- View of Tai Sheung Tok

Highest point
- Elevation: 399 m (1,309 ft)
- Coordinates: 22°19′30.74″N 114°14′18.18″E

Geography
- Location within Hong Kong
- Location: Hong Kong

Tai Sheung Tok (Chinese: 大上托) is a hill between the communities of Sau Mau Ping and Tseng Lan Shue, Hong Kong.

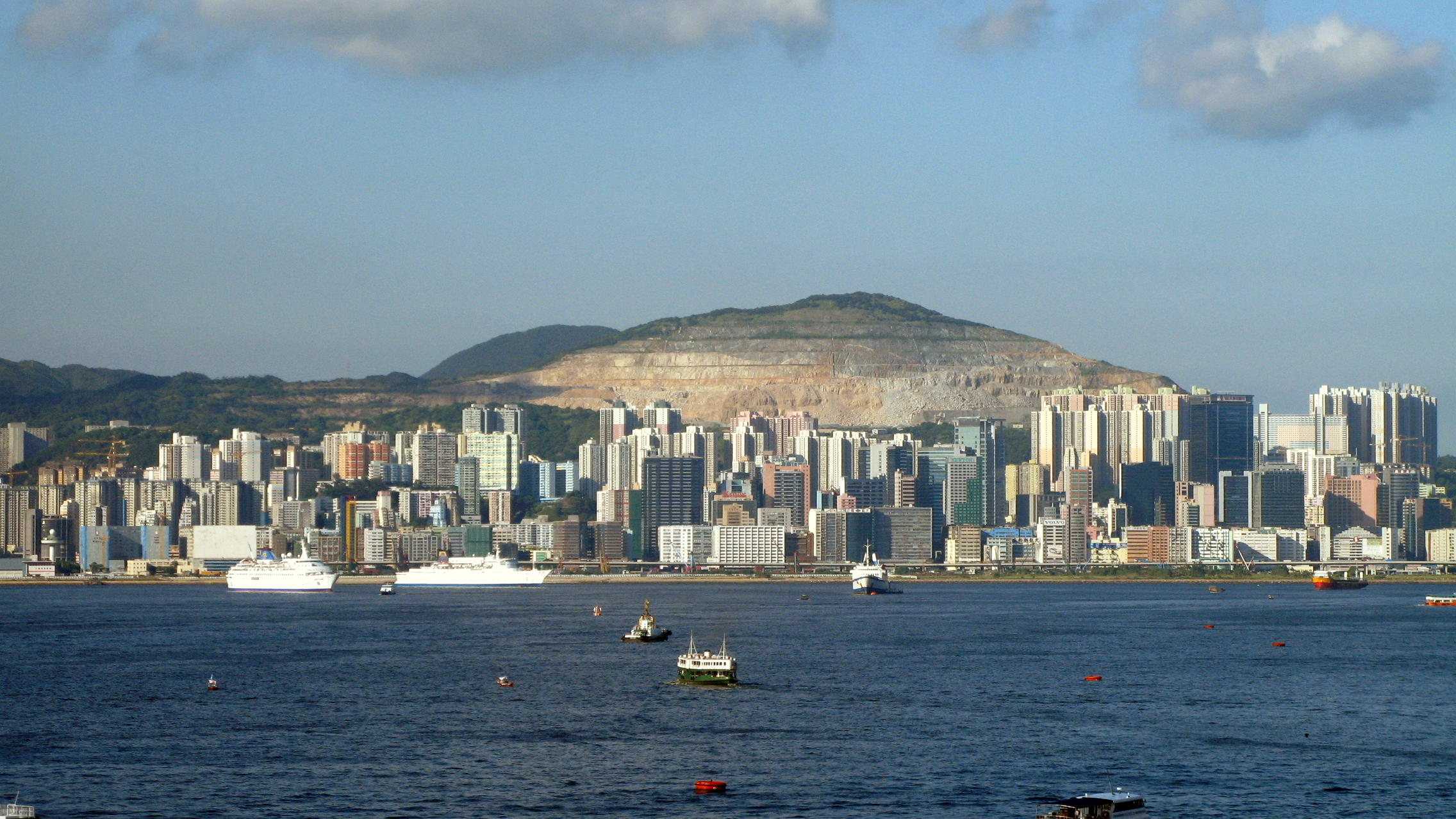
Tai Sheung Tok viewed from Hong Kong Island

== Geography ==
Tai Sheung Tok used to be 419m (1,375ft) in height, but because of mining activities by K. Wah Group (owned by Lui Che-woo who went on to become Macau gambling mogul) at the Anderson Quarry in the 20th century, its height has been reduced to 399m (1,309ft).

Civic construction work on the Development at Anderson Road (DAR) is being finished, while another project called the Development of Anderson Road Quarry Site (ARQ) has recently commenced at the foot of Tai Sheung Tok.

== Access ==
Section 3 of the Wilson Trail runs along the north eastern side of Tai Sheung Tok, connecting Ma Yau Tong with Tseng Lan Shue.

== See also ==
- List of mountains, peaks and hills in Hong Kong
- Wilson Trail
