= Sau Mau Ping station =

Proposed MTR station in the Kowloon, Hong Kong

Sau Mau Ping 秀茂坪

General information
- Location: Sau Mau Ping; Kwun Tong District, Hong Kong
- System: Proposed MTR rapid transit station
- Operator: MTR Corporation
- Line: East Kowloon line

Other information
- Status: Under planning
- Station code: SMP

Services
Preceding station	MTR	Following station
Proposed
Shun On towards Choi Hung East	East Kowloon line	Po Tat towards Yau Tong East

Sau Mau Ping (Chinese: 秀茂坪; Jyutping: sau^{3} mau^{6} ping^{4}) is a proposed MTR station on the proposed East Kowloon line. It will be located at Sau Mau Ping, Kwun Tong District, Kowloon, Hong Kong. The station is still under planning.
