= Ma Yau Tong =

Area in Hong Kong SAR

Coordinates: 22.319282°N 114.243885°E

- Traditional Chinese: 馬游塘
- Simplified Chinese: 马游塘
Transcriptions
Standard Mandarin
- Hanyu Pinyin: Mǎ Yóu Táng
Yue: Cantonese
- Jyutping: maa5 jau4 tong4

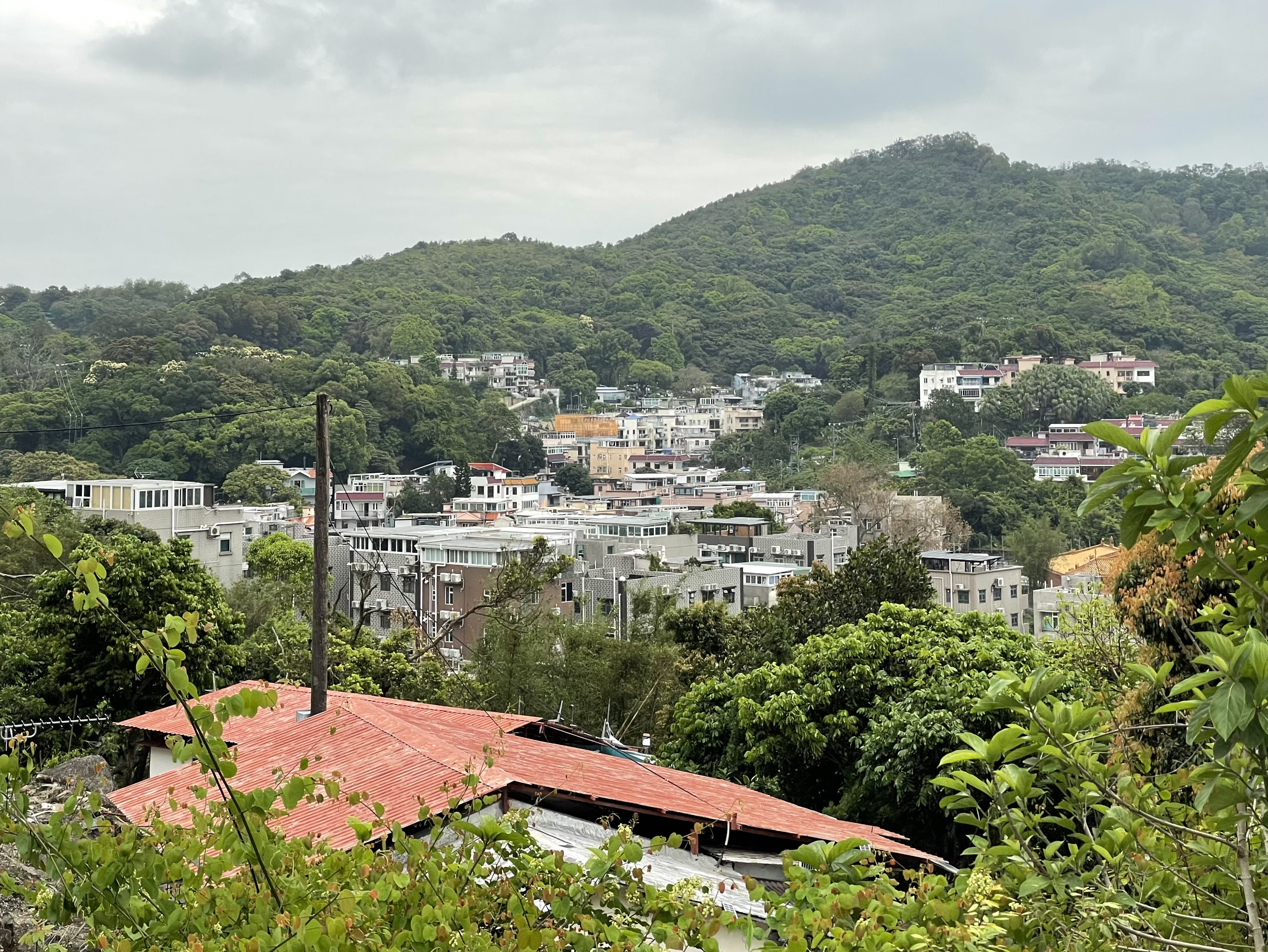
View of Ma Yau Tong Village from Po Lam Road.

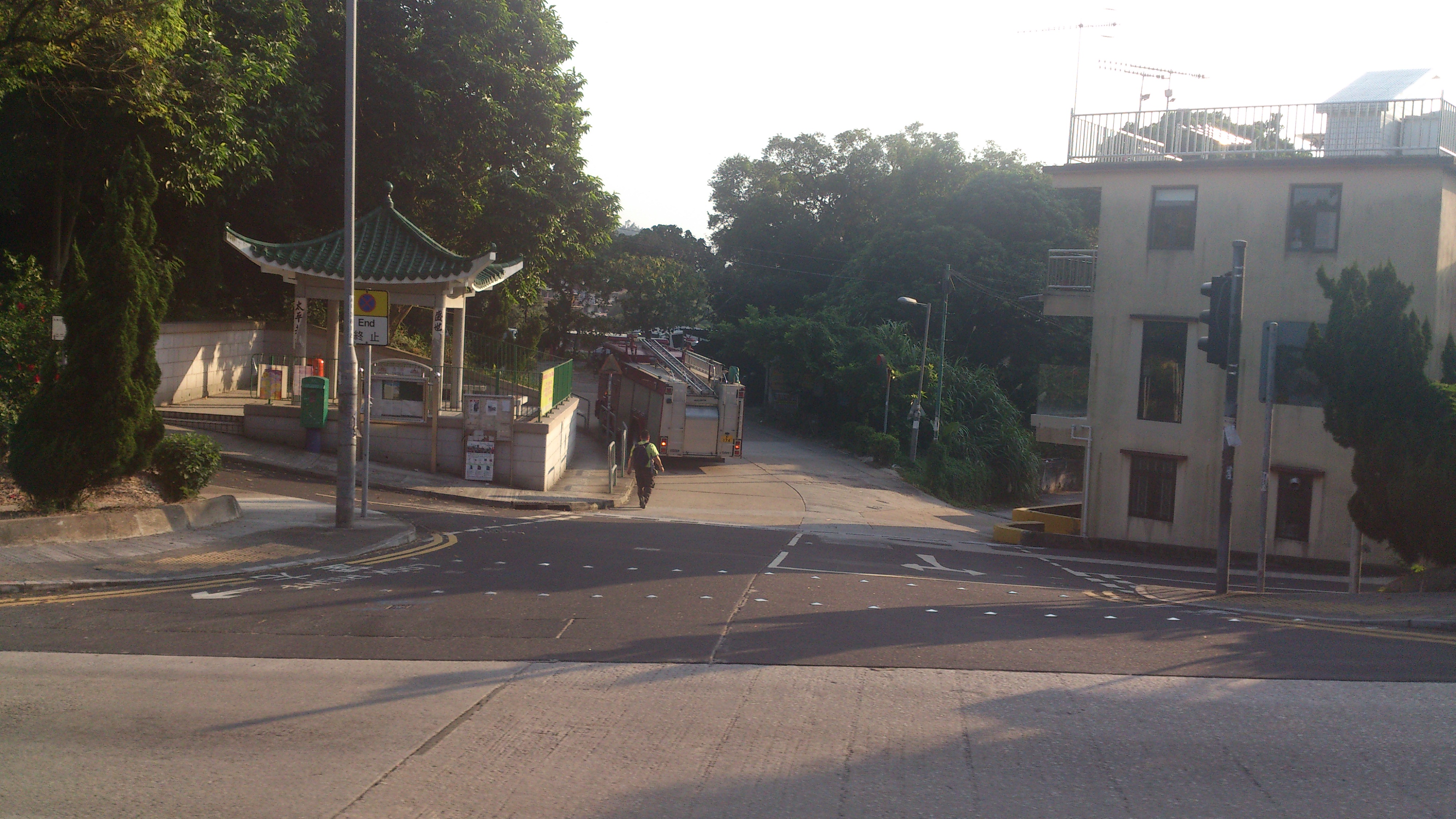
Ma Yau Tong Village in September 2013

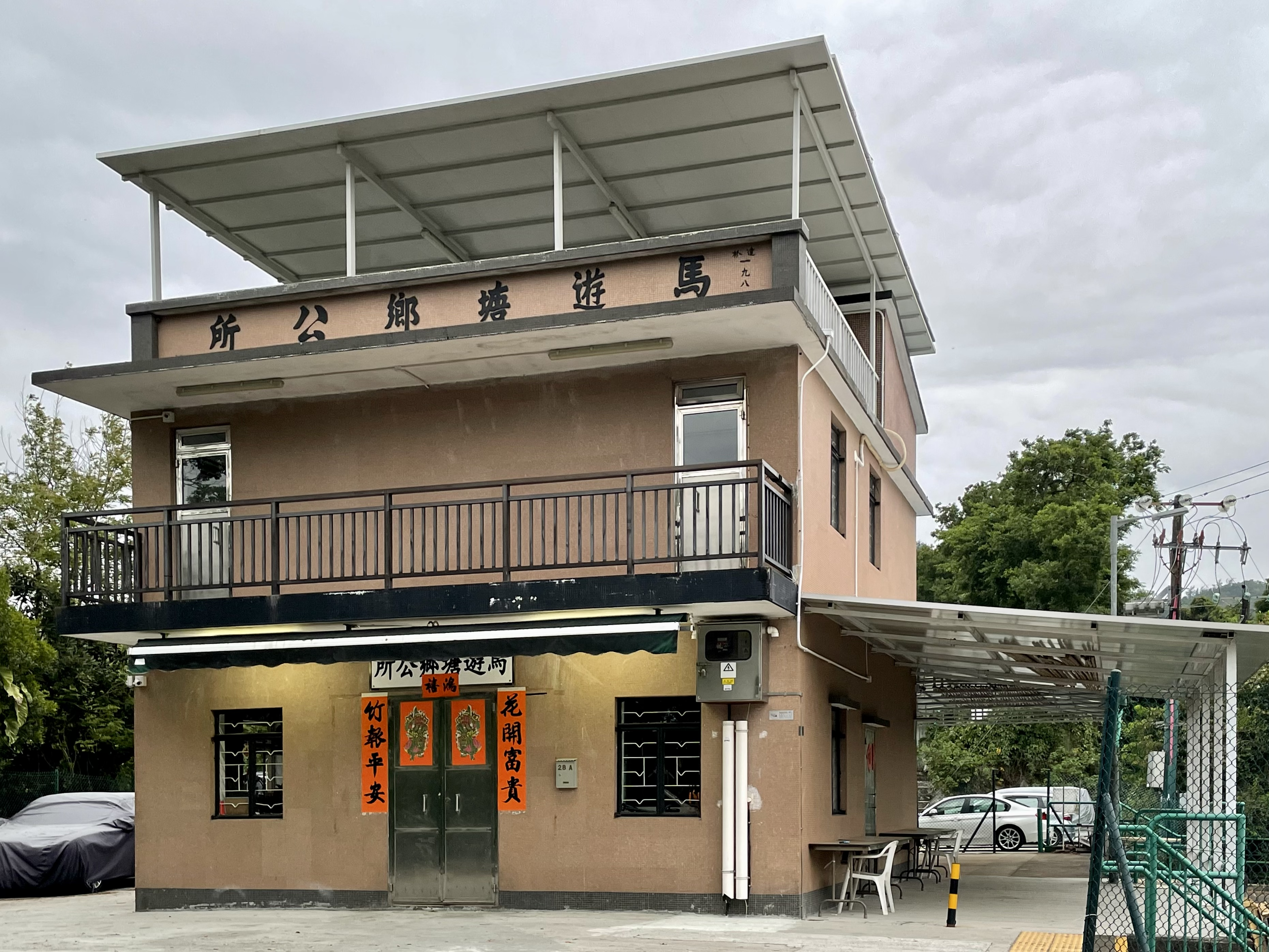
Ma Yau Tong Village Office.

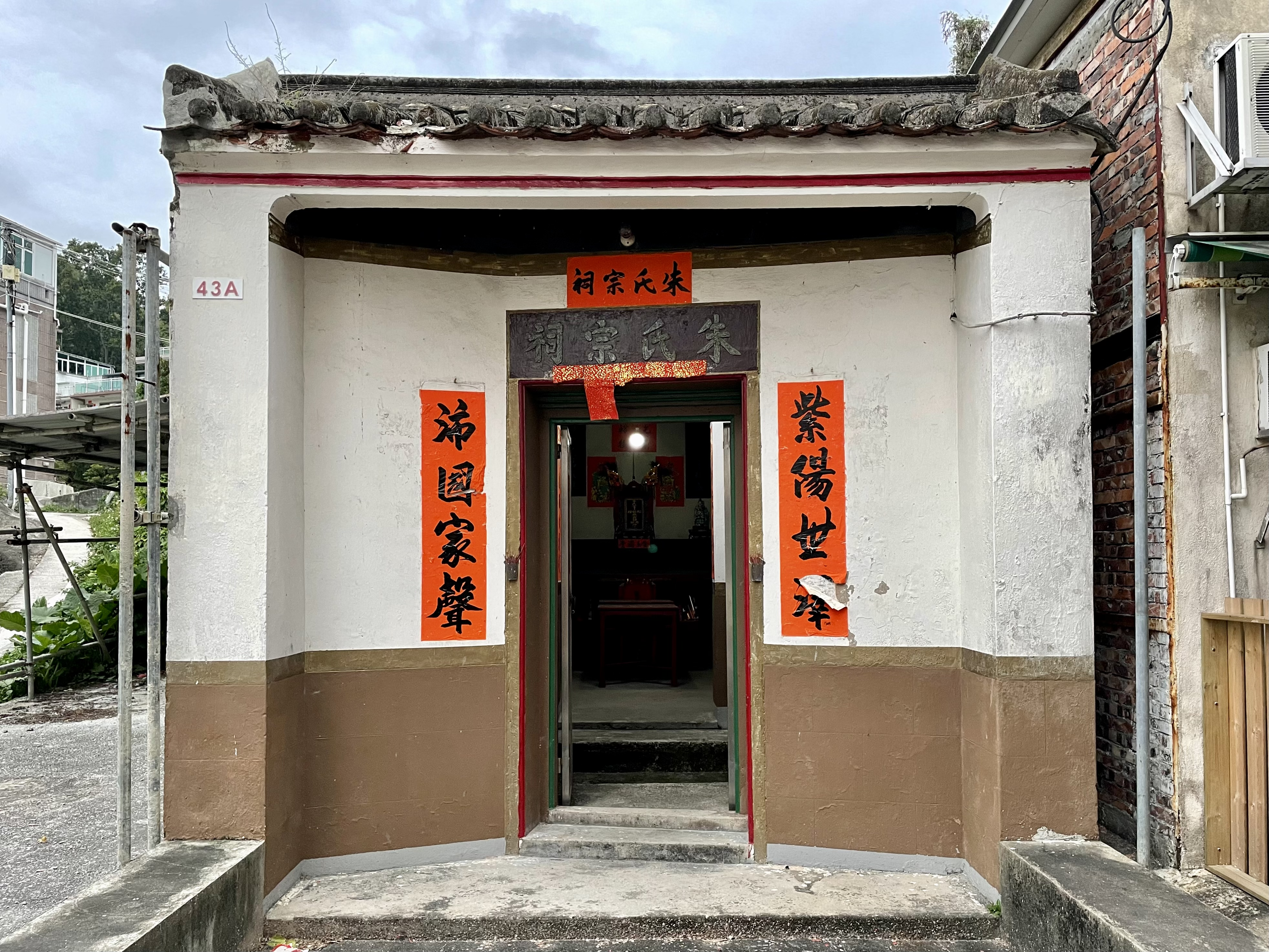
Chu Ancestral Hall (朱氏家祠) in Ma Yau Tong Village.

Ma Yau Tong (Chinese: 馬游塘) is an area on a mountain pass between Po Lam of Tseung Kwan O New Town and Sau Mau Ping of New Kowloon in Hong Kong. It is named after the village of the same name. It is known as Lau Tong and Ma Lau Tong in early 20th Century maps. Ma Yau Tong is on the border of New Kowloon and the New Territories.

Ma Yau Tong Au (馬游塘坳) is a specific name for the mountain pass in the area.

== Geography ==
The land is relatively flat on the saddle between Tai Sheung Tok (大上托), Mau Wu Shan (茅湖山) and Black Hill (五桂山). Ma Yau Tong is suitable for farming with rivers flowing towards the valleys east and west.

The landform of the valley west of Ma Yau Tong was greatly changed by the construction of the Tseung Kwan O Tunnel.

== Administration ==
Ma Yau Tong is a recognized village under the New Territories Small House Policy.

== History ==
At the time of the 1911 census, the population of Ma Yau Tong was 131. The number of males was 60.

As Ma Yau Tong is on the ridge of Kowloon, it has been on the defense line against Japanese invasion during World War II. The defense line was known as Ma Lau Tong Line.

== Education ==
Ma Yau Tong is in Primary One Admission (POA) School Net 48. Within the school net are multiple aided schools (operated independently but funded with government money) and Kwun Tong Government Primary School.

== Leisure ==
The Stage 3 of Wilson Trail passes through Ma Yau Tong.

== Transport ==
In the past, it was reachable on foot. When the British took over New Territories from Qing in 1899, their army built Anderson Road connecting Custom Hill and Devil's Peak along the mountain range, passing through Ma Yau Tong. The section north of Mau Yau Tong became a regular road and a short section south became Ma Yau Tong Road.

In 1955, a new road Po Lam Road was built to serve the refugees of Kuomintang in Rennie's Mill. The road began at the settlement and ends in Anderson Road at Ma Yau Tong. When the Tseung Kwan O New Town began to develop in 1980s, the road was improved by Hong Kong Government and extended to Sau Mau Ping. Another road, Tsui Lam Road, was built to connect a new public housing area in Po Lam of the new town.

Though not related to the transportation serving Ma Yau Tong, the Tseung Kwan O Tunnel beneath the high ground Ma Yau Tong is the major road traffic connection between the new town and the urban.
