= Po Tat station =

Proposed MTR station in the Kowloon, Hong Kong

Po Tat 寶達

General information
- Location: Sau Mau Ping; Kwun Tong District, Hong Kong
- System: Proposed MTR rapid transit station
- Operator: MTR Corporation
- Line: East Kowloon line

Other information
- Status: Under planning
- Station code: POT

Services
Preceding station	MTR	Following station
Proposed
Sau Mau Ping towards Choi Hung East	East Kowloon line	Ma Yau Tong towards Yau Tong East

Po Tat (Chinese: 寶達; Jyutping: bou^{2} daat^{6}) is a proposed MTR station on the proposed East Kowloon line. It will be located at Sau Mau Ping, Kwun Tong District, Kowloon, Hong Kong. The station is still under planning.
