= East Kowloon line =

Proposed Hong Kong metro route

Smart and Green Mass Transit System in East Kowloon 東九龍智慧綠色集體運輸系統

Overview
- Other name: East Kowloon line
- Status: Under planning
- Locale: Districts: Kwun Tong
- Termini: Choi Hung East; Yau Tong East
- Stations: 9

History
- Planned opening: By 2033

Technical
- Line length: 7 km (4.3 mi)

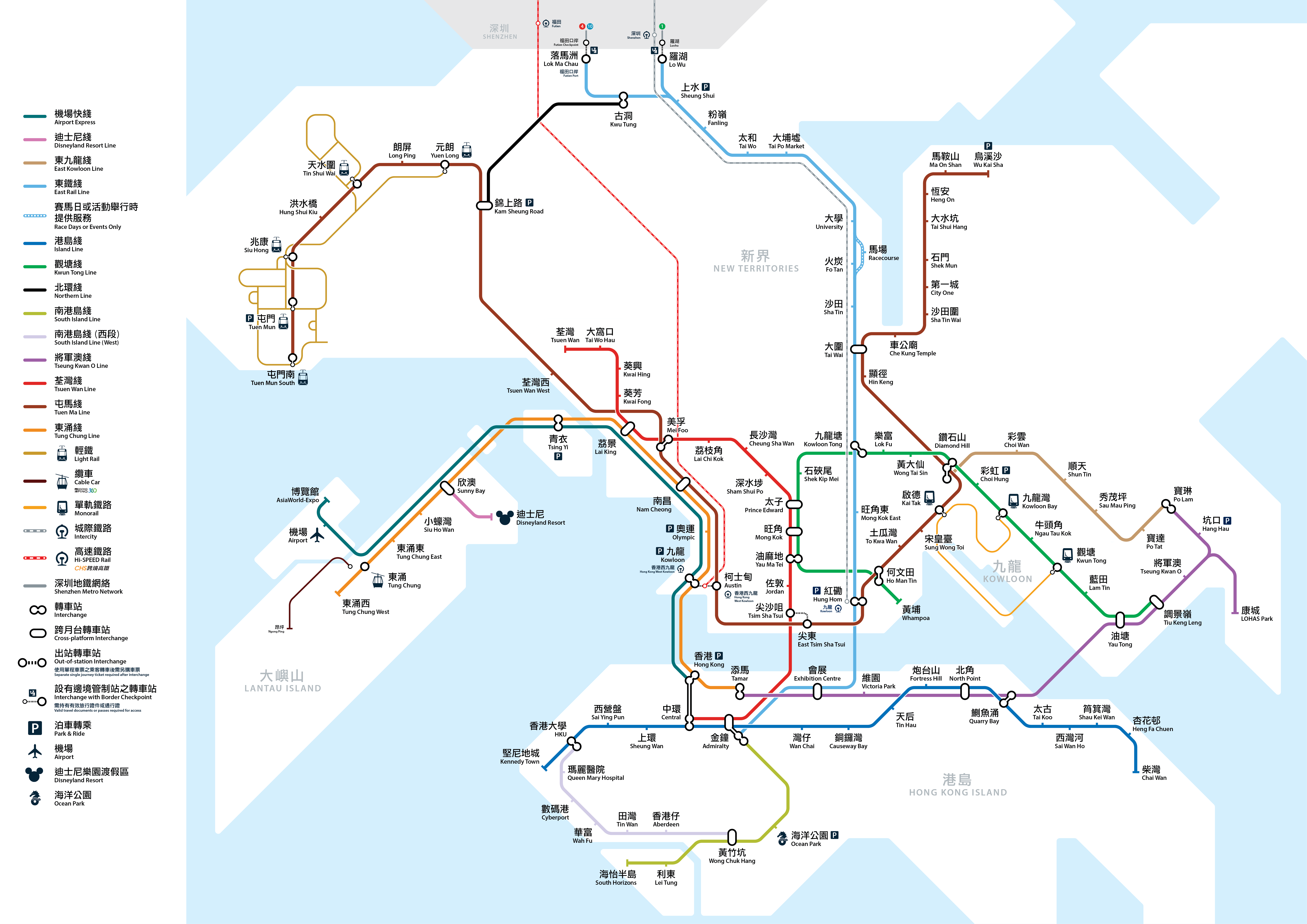
Railway Development Strategy 2014

The Smart and Green Mass Transit System in East Kowloon (Chinese: 東九龍智慧綠色集體運輸系統; Jyutping: dung^{1} gau^{2} lung^{4} zi^{3} wai^{6} luk^{6} sik^{1} zaap^{6} tai^{2} wan^{6} syu^{1} hai^{6} tung^{2}), also known as the East Kowloon line (Chinese: 東九龍綫; Jyutping: dung^{1} gau^{2} lung^{4} sin^{3}), is a proposed Hong Kong rapid transit line that would run from Diamond Hill to Tseung Kwan O New Town. The route would pass through the hilly Sau Mau Ping residential area, which is not directly served by any local railway service at present. The scheme was first revealed by the Hong Kong Government in the "Railway Development Strategy 2014" as the East Kowloon line, published September 2014. The project is related to the government-led redevelopment of the East Kowloon area as well as planned residential development in the Anderson Road/Sau Mau Ping district.

== Overview ==
The estimated construction cost of this line is highest among all seven railway plans proposed in the railway strategy due to the steep terrain along its alignment. The estimated cost is HK$27.5 billion (approximately US$3.5 billion) at 2013 prices, making it HK$3.5 billion (US$450 million) per kilometre. Experts recommended the line begin construction in 2019 with a finish date in 2025. There will be five stations on the new railway, including four new stations and one interchange stations allowing connections to the Kwun Tong line.

Stations are planned for Choi Wan, Shun Tin, Sau Mau Ping and Po Tat, as well as the vicinity of large-scale new development projects including the Choi Wan Road and Jordan Valley development programme, the Anderson Road development plan, the Anderson Road Quarry development plan, the "Energising Kowloon East" programme, and so on. At the strategic level, it would serve as an alternative route of travel in the event of a stoppage on the Kwun Tong line, thereby enhancing overall network stability.

All stations would be underground. Sai Kung District Council suggested an additional station in the Hong King (Hong Sing Garden and King Lam Estate) area between Po Tat and Po Lam stations before leaving Tseung Kwan O New Town, meaning the government may take the suggestion into consideration.

As of 2024, construction has not begun while technical design proposals are still under consideration.

In 2022, there was another new proposal from the government with an "elevated trackless rapid system", with the route shortened to between Choi Hung and Sau Mau Ping, without serving Tseung Kwan O. On 3 January 2023, the Hong Kong Federation of Trade Unions said the government will wholly fund the construction of an elevated trackless rapid transit system in East Kowloon connecting Yau Tong and Choi Hung. The to-be-built Choi Hung East Station will be located next to St. Joseph's Home for the Aged, 100 metres away from the existing Choi Hung MTR Station.
