= Sau Mau Ping Estate =

Housing estate in Sau Mau Ping, Hong Kong

Coordinates: 22.3162°N 114.2331°E

- Chinese: 秀茂坪邨
- Cantonese Yale: sau mauh pìhng chyūn
Transcriptions
Yue: Cantonese
- Yale Romanization: sau mauh pìhng chyūn
- Jyutping: sau3 mau6 ping4 cyun1

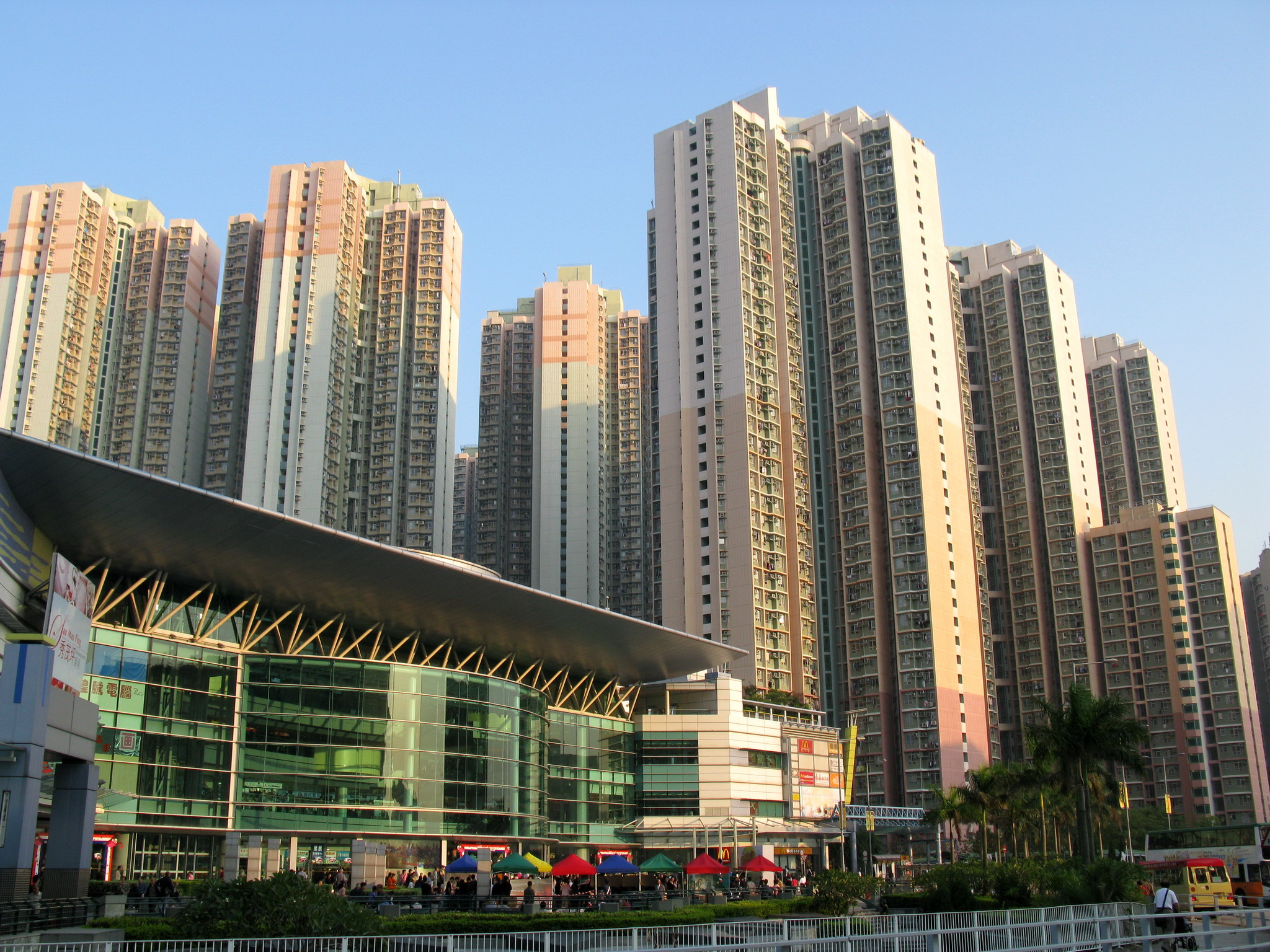
Central part of Sau Mau Ping Estate, with Sau Mau Ping Shopping Centre at the left

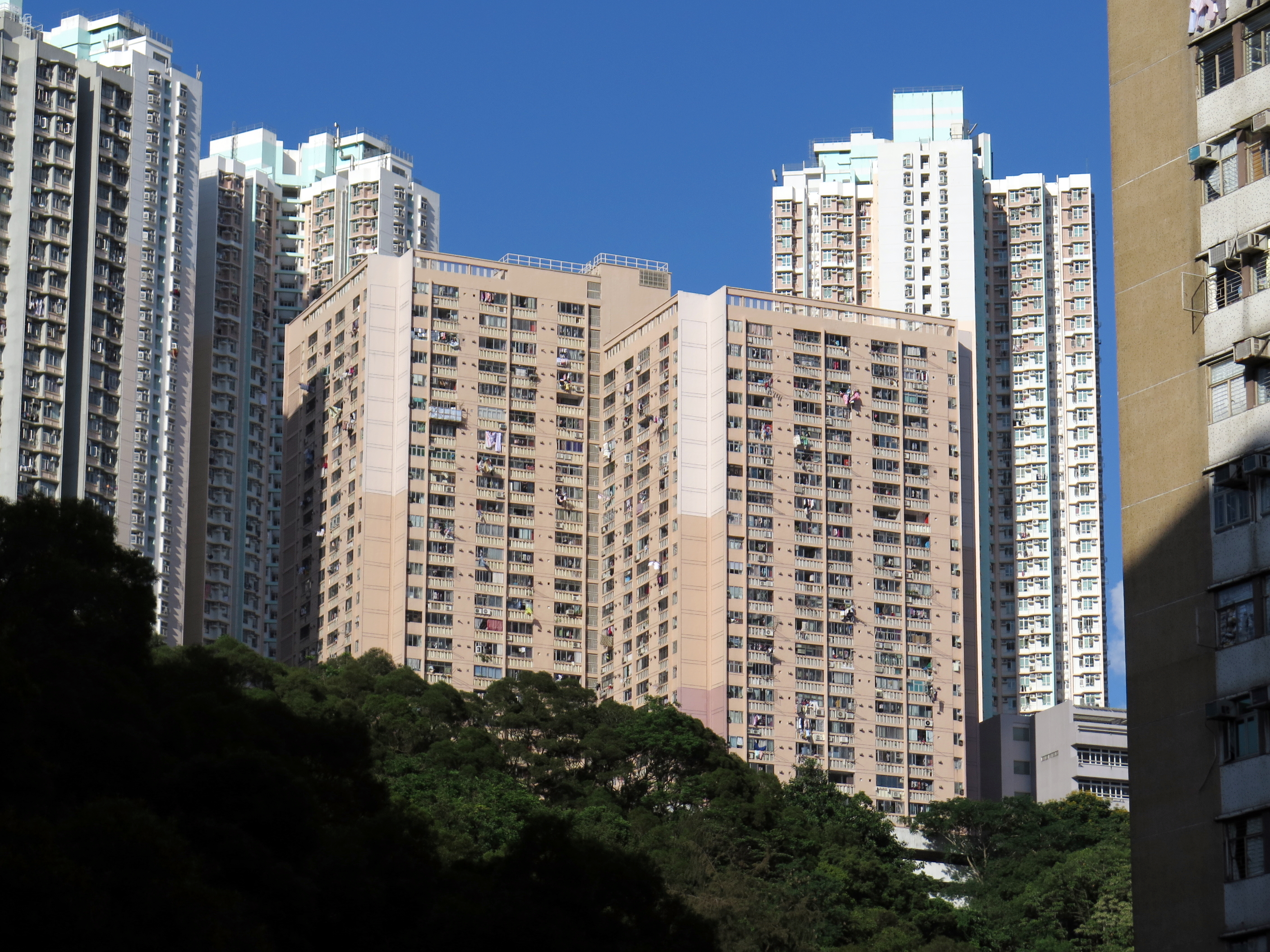
Sau Mau Ping Estate Sau Ming House

Sau Mau Ping Estate (Chinese: 秀茂坪邨) is one of the earliest public housing estates in Kwun Tong District, New Kowloon, Hong Kong. It has 18 tenement blocks, providing a total of 12,310 rental flats. Each of them has a size of 10.6 to 52.2 square metres (114 to 562 sq ft). A total of 38,833 residents currently live in the 11,912 households on the Sau Mau Ping Estate.

Hiu Lai Court (曉麗苑) is a Home Ownership Scheme court beneath Sau Mau Ping Estate. It has a total of eight blocks built in 1997.

== History ==
Block 19–21 of Sau Mau Ping (I & II) Estate

Block 23 of Sau Mau Ping (II) Estate

Block 40–41 of Sau Mau Ping (III) Estate

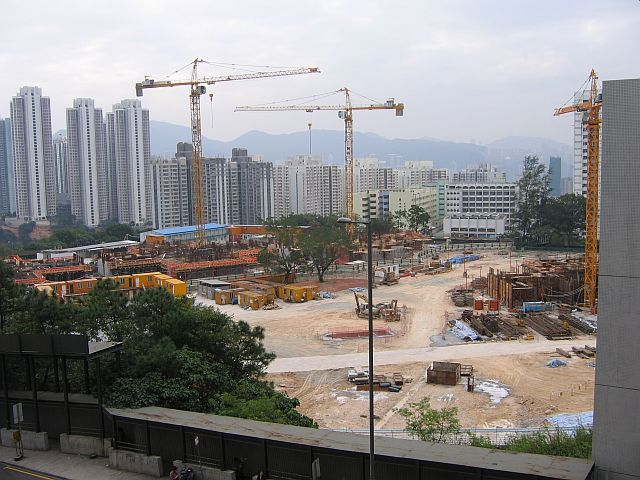
Sau Mau Ping Estate, under reconstruction

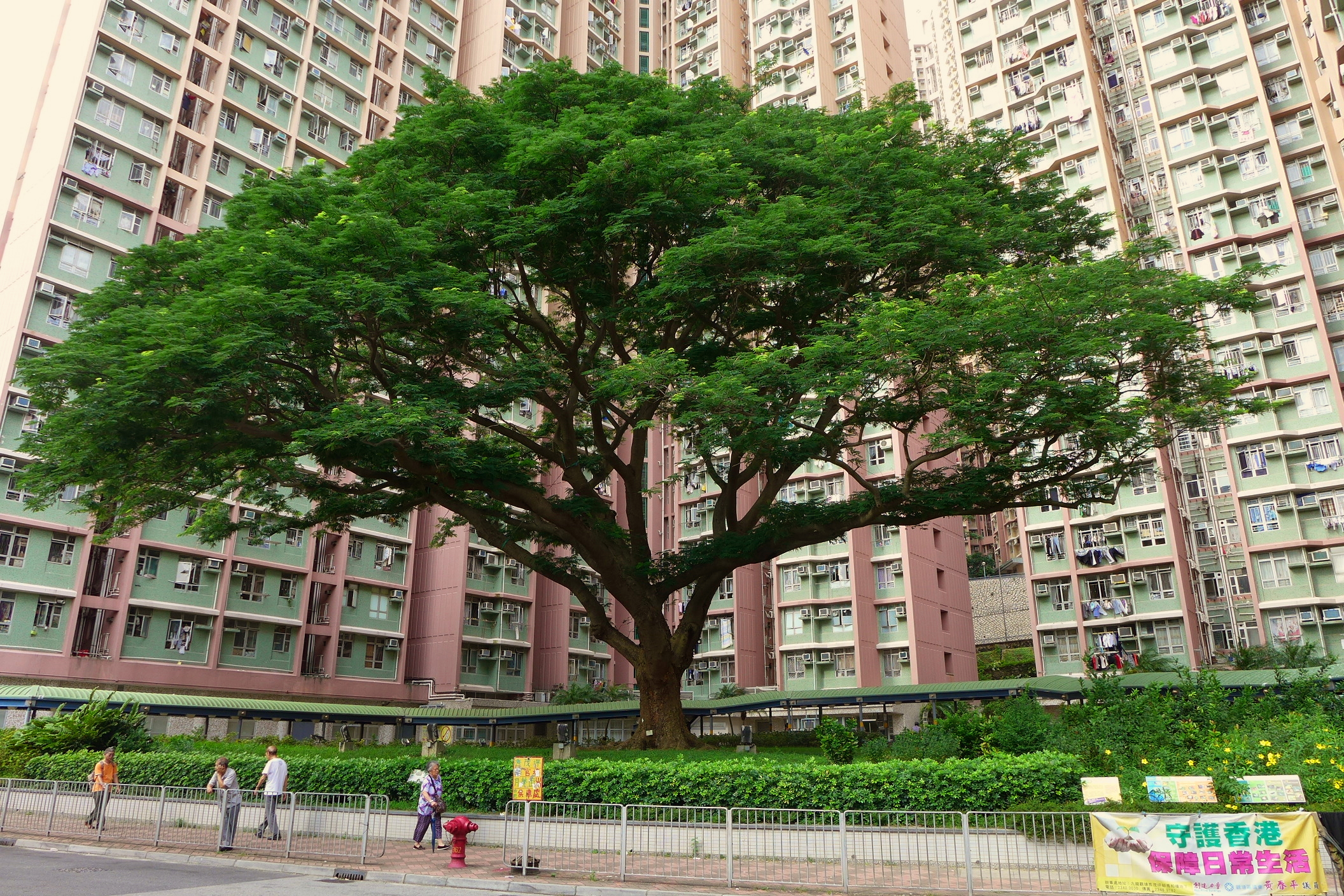
Old trees in Sau Mau Ping Estate

After the World War II, the population of Hong Kong grew rapidly. Therefore, the Hong Kong government decided to build a resettlement area in Sau Mau Ping, which was then known as the Sau Mau Ping Resettlement Area. This resettlement area later became the Sau Mau Ping Estate as it is today.

The development of Sau Mau Ping Resettlement Area (or the later Sau Mau Ping Estate) can be divided into six phases:

=== Phase 1 ===
The first phase of the estate's development starts at lower Sau Mau Ping, and was completed during 1964–1966. It consisted of the building of Blocks 1–17, which are all 7-storey L-shaped resettlement buildings. The Blocks 1–17 was collectively called Sau Mau Ping (IV) Estate.

All buildings in phase 1 were demolished in 1992. They were later reconstructed and became the current Hiu Lai Court.

=== Phase 2 ===
The second phase of development was the construction of Blocks 32–41 at regions currently known as central Sau Mau Ping. Blocks 34–41 were completed during 1966–1967, and are then collectively called Sau Mau Ping (III) Estate. Blocks 32–33 were completed later in 1969.

Blocks 32–33 were demolished in 1997, and are reconstructed to become the current Sau Mau Ping Shopping Centre. Blocks 34–36 were also demolished in the same year, and the site was used for the reconstruction of 4 Harmony-style public rental housing building, currently known as Sau Nga House (秀雅樓), Sau Yee House (秀義樓), Sau Hong House (秀康樓) and Sau Lok House (秀樂樓). Blocks 37–41 were demolished in 2001.

=== Phase 3 ===
The third phase consisted of only two blocks, Blocks 26–27. They have a special structure resembles that of Block 66 in Tsz Wan Shan Resettlement Area, in which they are connected with each other to form a long building.

However, the two blocks were demolished as early as in 1989 because of safety concerns.

=== Phase 4 ===
Phase 4 of the development involves the construction of Blocks 31, which then combines with the existing Blocks 32 and 33 to form a complex. The construction of the resettlement complex completed during 1968–1970. Later on, the ground floor of the complex became a marketplace. The complex was demolished in 1997.

=== Phase 5 ===
The fifth phase of the development involved the construction of Blocks 19–20 and 28–30, which were completed in 1970. After the completion of Phase 5, Blocks 19–31 was collectively named as Sau Mau Ping (I) Estate.

Block 18 was planned to be built in Phase 5 development of Sau Mau Ping, at the site of the current Sau Ming House (秀明樓). The construction work has never been carried out due to practical difficulties.

Blocks 28–30 were demolished in 1997, and Blocks 19–20 were demolished in 2001.

=== Phase 6 ===
The sixth phase consisted of Blocks 21–25, completed in 1971, and Blocks 42–45, completed in 1973. All these blocks are collectively named as Sau Mau Ping (II) Estate.

Blocks 42–45 were demolished in 1996 due to structural problems. The site was rebuilt into three buildings of the current Sau Mau Ping Estate, namely Sau Ching House (秀程樓), Sau Yue House (秀裕樓) and Sau Fai House (秀暉樓).

=== Phases 7 & 8 ===
By the end of 2000, the Hong Kong Housing Authority has decided to demolish and rebuild at the site of the old Sau Mau Ping Estate, which were condemned in 2003. The redevelopment project was finally completed in July 2009, and the new public rental housing estate was named Sau Mau Ping Estate, the same name as the original one. They were occupied in 3rd quarter of 2009.

== Notable events ==
=== Gang murder ===
On 14 May 1997, the chilling torture and murder of 16-year-old Luk Chi-wai (陸志偉) nicknamed “Chicken” (阿雞) took place and shocked the city at the time. “Chicken” Luk was at the time of death was a part of a youth gang. The gang unfortunately began targeting then 30-year-old intellectually disabled man; Chan Muk-Ching (陳木清) nicknamed “No. 3 uncle” (三叔) who “Chicken” Luk happened to be close to. When “Chicken” Luk told “No. 3 uncle” to report the bullying to the police, word of it got to the ringleader; then 17-year-old Hui Chi-Wai (許智偉) who decided to teach “Chicken” a lesson. As a result, “Chicken” was lured into “No. 3 uncle”’s flat where he was dragged in by the other gang members, and with Hui overseeing the situation, “Chicken” was tortured, beaten, forced to eat cigarette butts, and ultimately murdered by his fellow gang members. As a result, his action was considered betrayal by his fellow gang and he was beaten with fists, kicked and attacked with blunt weapons until death, then his body was burned in a trash bag. As a result, those convicted (all juveniles) served life sentences with Hui sentenced to 26 years. At the time, it was reported that the background of those convicted where the sons of Thai women working as domestic workers, and suffered from abuse by said Thai mothers. And much like how debates were spawned over the role violent video games played in the Columbine High School shooting in America, scrutiny was sparked regarding media that glorified and romanticize gang lifestyle; namely the Teddy Boy (古惑仔) comics.

In 1999, a movie; Street Kids Violence (三五成群) was released which is based on this case.

=== COVID-19 pandemic ===
Three buildings were placed under lockdown during the COVID-19 pandemic in 2022. Sau Yee House was sealed off on 25 February 2022, Sau Ming House on 26 February, and Sau Fu House on 27 February.

== Residential buildings ==
=== Sau Mau Ping Estate ===
{According to 2016 Population By-census, Sau Mau Ping (North) houses 20,616, Sau Mau Ping (South) houses 15,415 and Sau Mau Ping (Centre) 16,979 respectively. Altogether the population amounts to 53,010.}

Name	Building Type	Number of Floors	Year of completion
Sau Chi House (秀緻樓)	Harmony 1	41	2001
Sau Ching House (秀程樓)	Harmony 1	41	2001
Sau Fai House (秀暉樓)	Single Aspect Building	21	2001
Sau Fu House (秀富樓)	Harmony 3	27	1993
Sau Hong House (秀康樓)	Harmony 2	38	1996
Sau King House (秀景樓)	Harmony 1	41	2001
Sau Lok House (秀樂樓)	Harmony 2	38	1996
Sau Ming House (秀明樓)	Twin Tower	24	1985
Sau Nga House (秀雅樓)	Harmony 1	41	2001
Sau On House (秀安樓)	Harmony 3	38	1993
Sau Wah House (秀華樓)	Harmony 1	41	2001
Sau Wai House (秀慧樓)	Harmony 1	41	2001
Sau Wo House (秀和樓)	Harmony 1	41	2001
Sau Yee House (秀義樓)	Harmony 1	41	2001
Sau Yin House (秀賢樓)	Harmony 1	41	2001
Sau Yat House (秀逸樓)	Harmony 1 (with Harmony 3 Annex)	41	2001
Sau Yue House (秀裕樓)	Harmony 1	41	2001
Sau Yun House (秀潤樓)	Non-Standard	18	2019

=== Sau Mau Ping (South) Estate ===
Name	Building Type	Number of Floors	Year of completion
Sau Tak House (秀德樓)	New Harmony 1	41	2009
Sau Sin House (秀善樓)	New Harmony 1	41	2009
Sau Mei House (秀美樓)	New Harmony 1	41	2009
Sau Hou House (秀好樓)	New Harmony 1	41	2009
Sau Wong House (秀旺樓)	New Harmony 1	41	2009

=== Hiu Lai Court ===
Name	Building Type	Number of Floors	Year of completion
Hiu Tin House (曉天閣)	Harmony 1	38	1997
Hiu Sing House (曉星閣)	Harmony 1	38	1997
Hiu Ching House (曉晴閣)	Harmony 1	38	1997
Hiu Fai House (曉暉閣)	Harmony 1	38	1997
Hiu On House (曉安閣)	Harmony 1	38	1997
Hiu Yat House (曉逸閣)	Harmony 1	38	1997
Hiu Wo House (曉和閣)	Harmony 1	38	1997
Hiu Shun House (曉順閣)	Harmony 1	38	1997

== Public facilities ==
Hong Kong Public Libraries maintains the Sau Mau Ping Public Library in Sau Yun House.

=== Sau Mau Ping Shopping Centre ===
Sau Mau Ping Shopping Centre (秀茂坪商場) was established in 2002, located near Sau Mau Ping Estate, with approximately 26401.6 square metres. A fresh market is located at ground floor had been renovated in September 2015.

- Year of completion: 2002
- Total lettable area: 14700 sq. metres

== See also ==
- Sau Mau Ping
