= Hiu Lai Court =

Home Ownership Scheme housing estate in Hong Kong

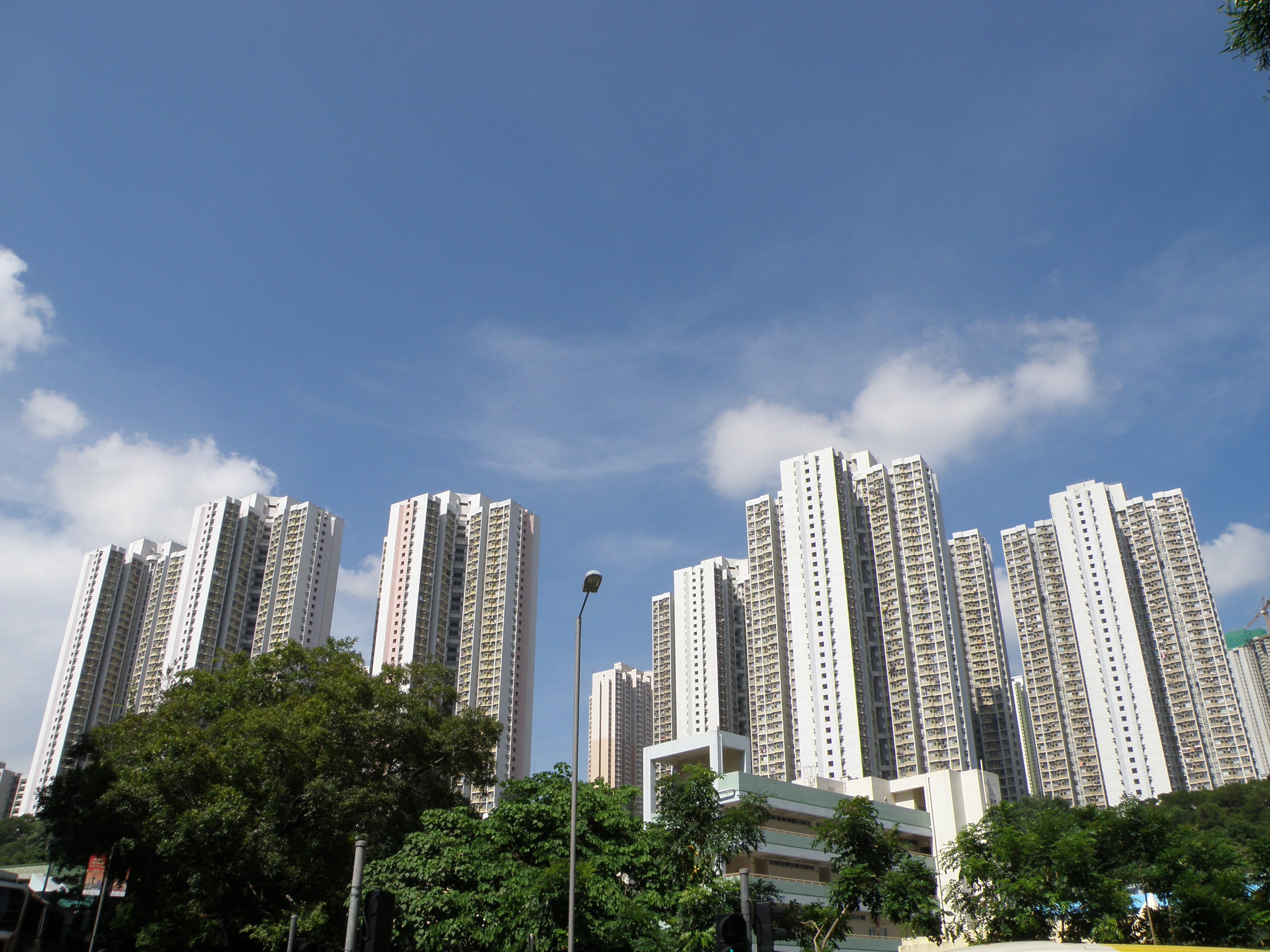
- Interactive map of Hiu Lai Court

General information
- Location: Kwun Tong
- Category: Home Ownership Scheme
- No. of blocks: 8

Construction
- Constructed: 1997; 29 years ago

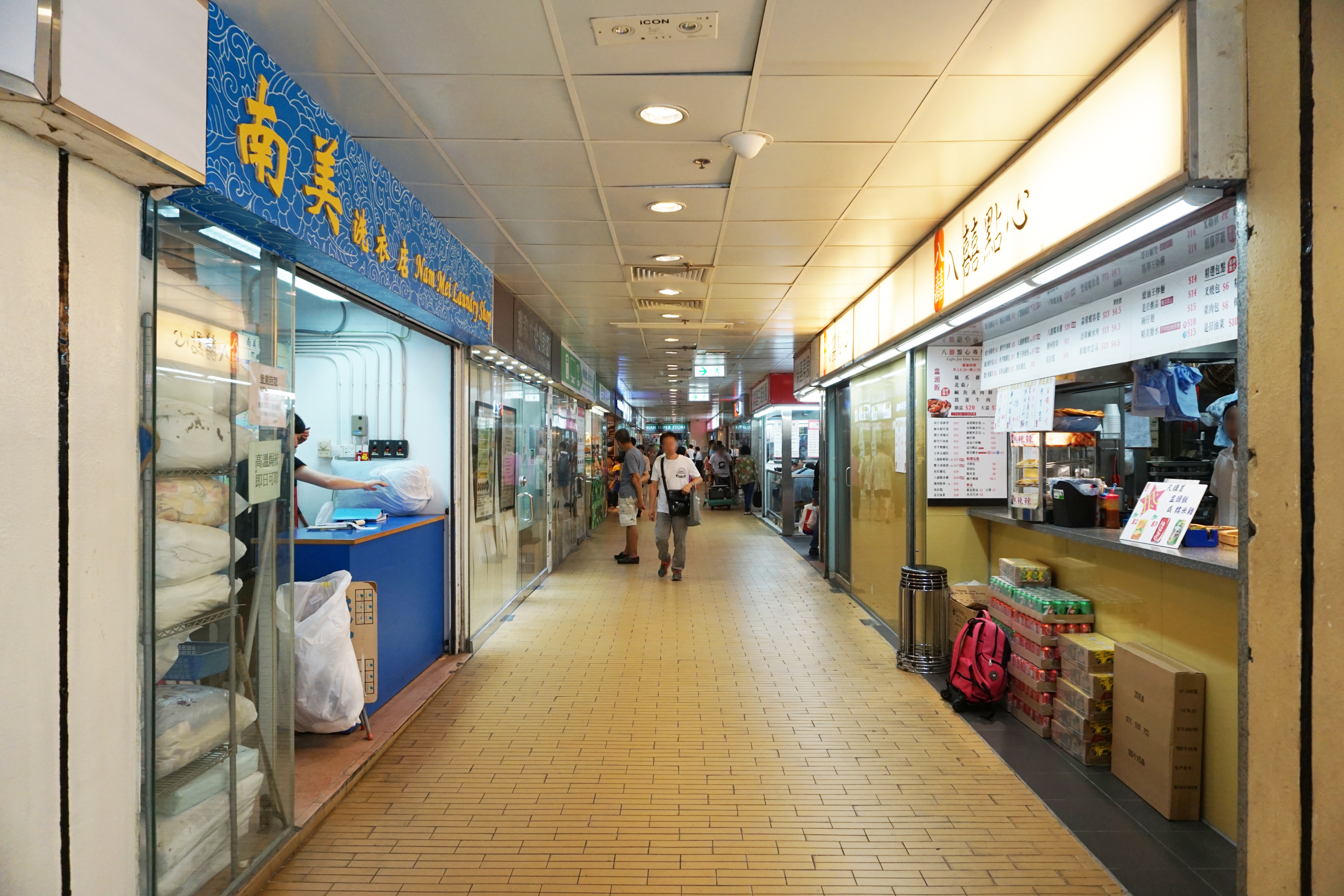
Hiu Lai Shopping Centre

Hiu Lai Court is located at Hiu Kwong Street in Sau Mau Ping. It is a housing estate under Home Ownership Scheme launched by Hong Kong Housing Authority. It has a total of eight blocks built in 1997. All of them belongs to Harmony blocks in their building type.

== Blocks ==
Name	Building Type	Year of completion
Hiu Tin House (曉天閣)	Harmony	1997
Hiu Sing House (曉星閣)	Harmony	1997
Hiu Ching House (曉晴閣)	Harmony	1997
Hiu Fai House (曉暉閣)	Harmony	1997
Hiu On House (曉安閣)	Harmony	1997
Hiu Yat House (曉逸閣)	Harmony	1997
Hiu Wo House (曉和閣)	Harmony	1997
Hiu Shun House (曉順閣)	Harmony	1997

== Education ==
- Chan Mung Yan Lutheran Kindergarten
- C. A. S. M. P. Chen Lee Wing Tsing Kindergarten
