= Anderson Road, Hong Kong =

Road in Kowloon, Hong Kong

Coordinates: 22.3269°N 114.2363°E

- Traditional Chinese: 安達臣道
Transcriptions

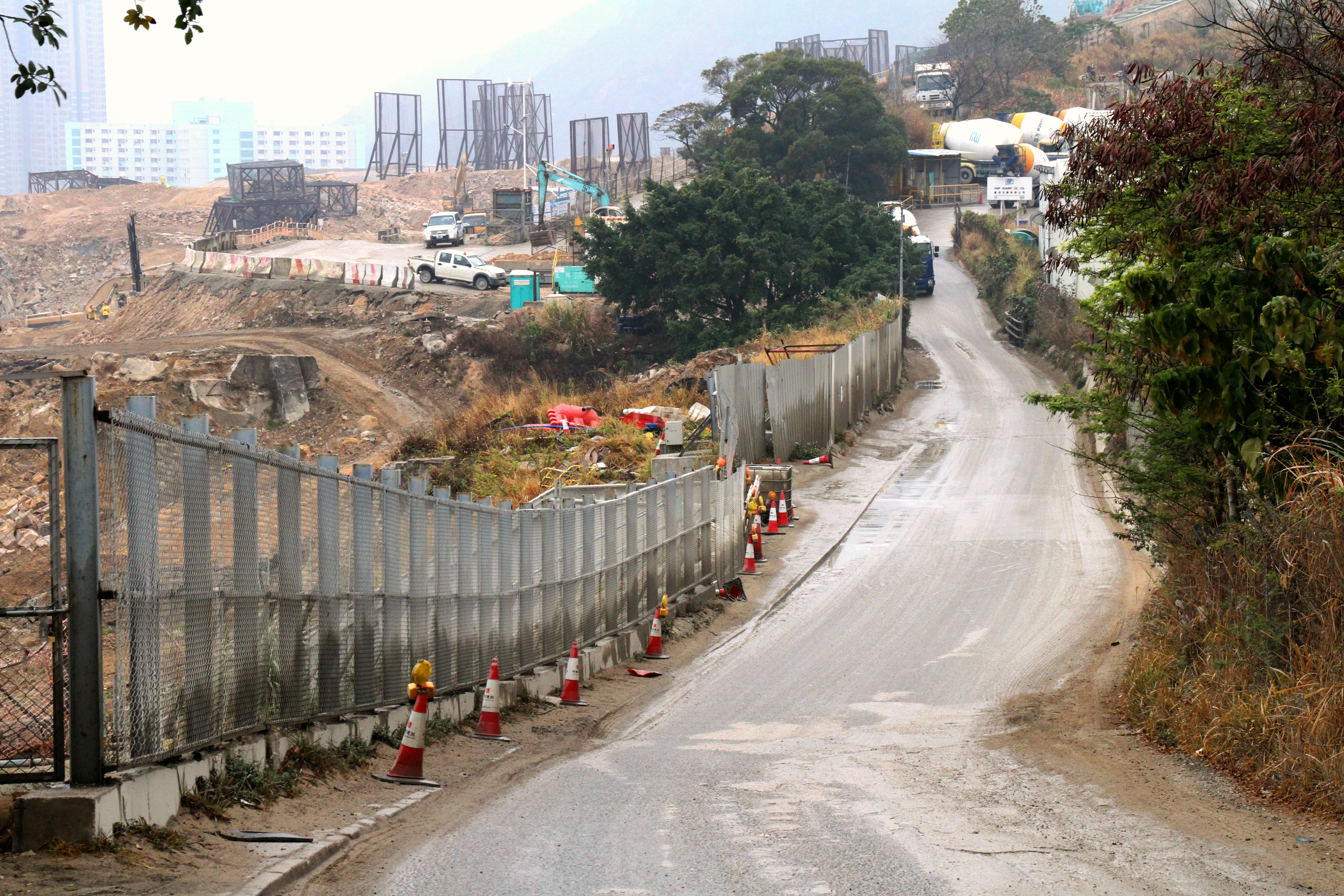
A section of Anderson Road.

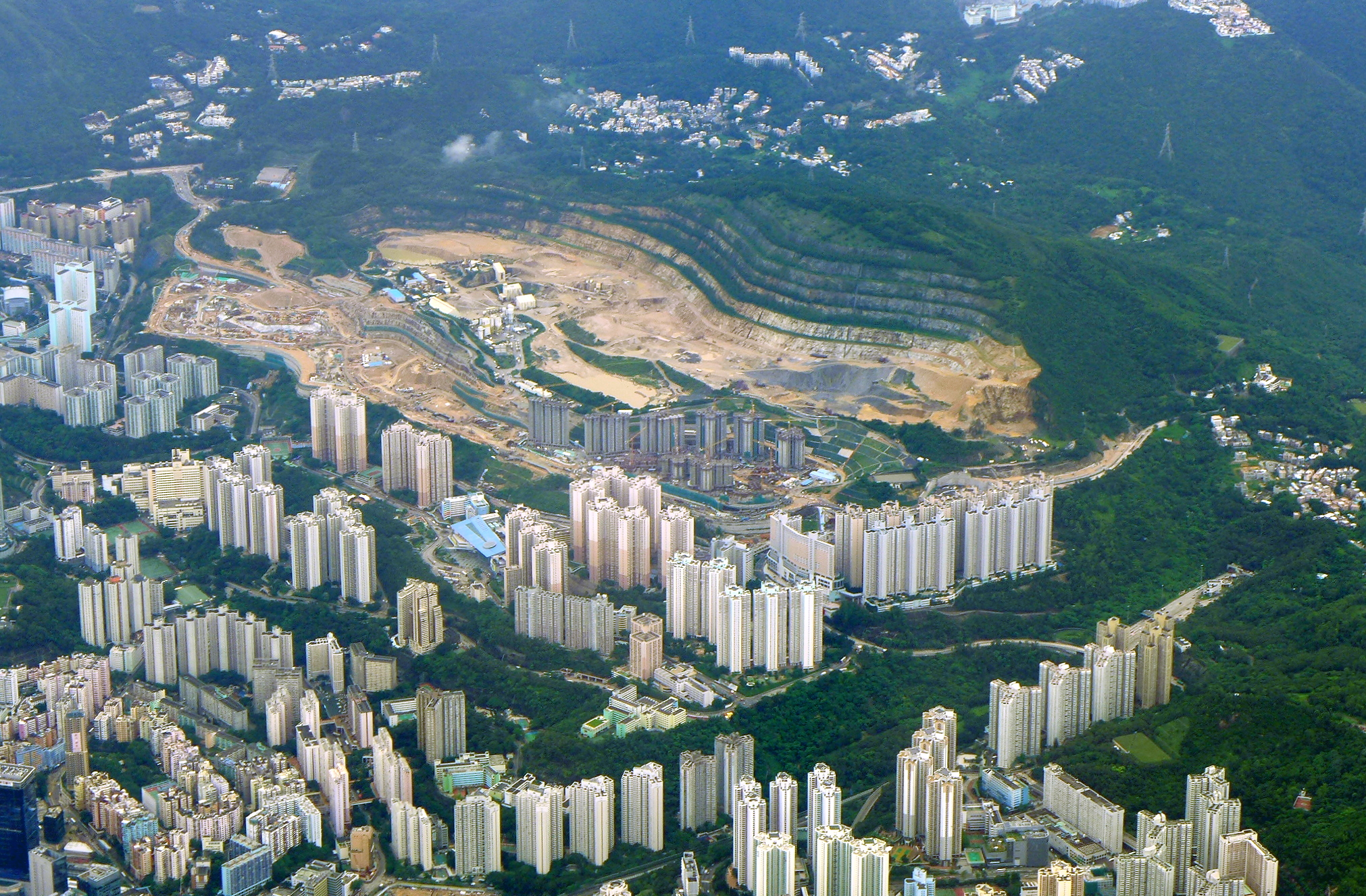
Anderson Road Quarry and surrounding development site in 2014

Anderson Road (Chinese: 安達臣道; Jyutping: on1 daat6 san4 dou6) is a road on the eastern border of the New Territories and New Kowloon in Hong Kong. It starts near the junction of Clear Water Bay Road and New Clear Water Bay Road, above Shun Lee Estate, then continues southeast to Tseng Lan Shue and eastward through the hills above Sau Mau Ping, and finally ends at Po Lam Road (寶琳路) in Ma Yau Tong.

== Anderson Road Quarry ==
To the east of the road is Tai Sheung Tok hill. From 1964, the hilltop was developed as a large quarry, Anderson Road Quarry (安達臣道石礦場), highly visible from much of Kowloon and Hong Kong, which supplied construction aggregate to Hong Kong until July 2017, operated by the K.Wah Group, when it was one of only three quarries still operating in Hong Kong, along with those in Shek O and Lam Tei. The quarry site is on the ridge surrounding Kowloon, visible from much of urban Hong Kong, but was ultimately deemed to damage the beauty and the fungshui of Victoria Harbour.

Planning for a major development of the 40-hectare site (called 'ARQ' or 'ARQS') for around 9400 private and subsidised housing flats serving a residential population of 25,000 is in progress. The development is expected to accept its first residents in 2023–24.

== History ==
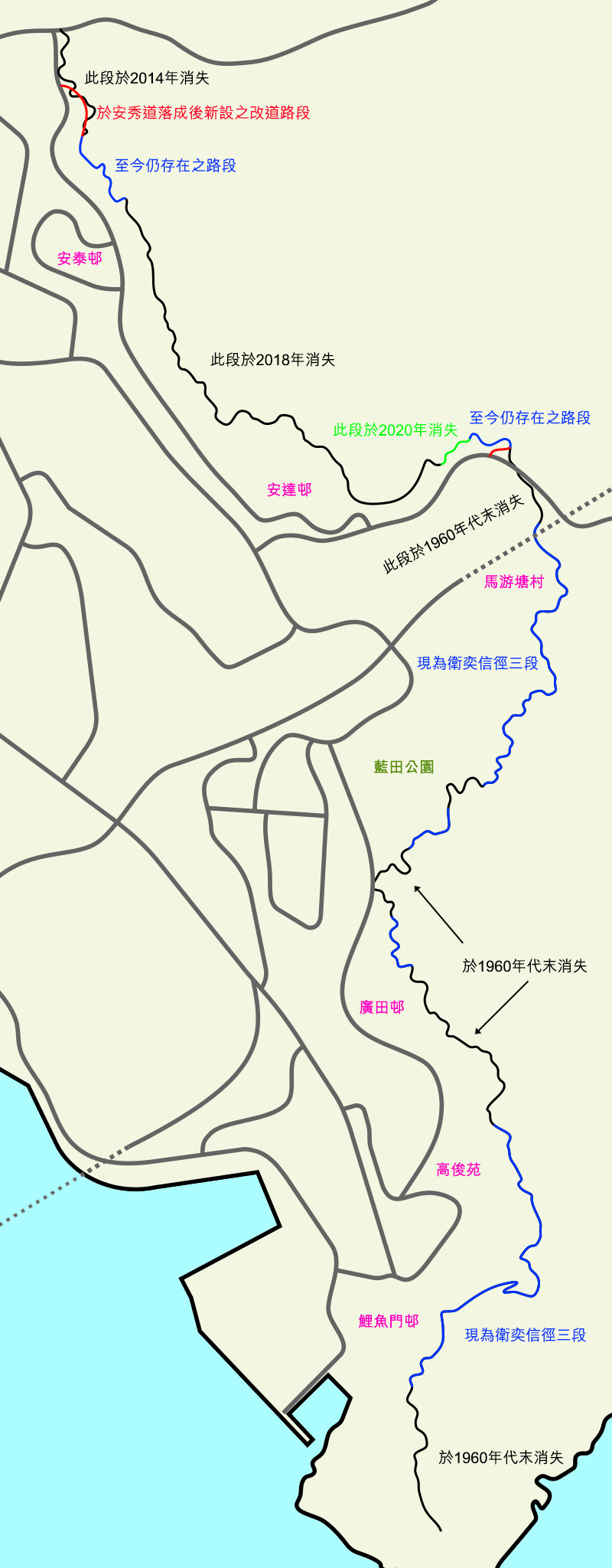
Map of the old Anderson Road, only sections in blue survived, while most others disappeared in late 1960s or 2016

The road is one of earliest roads built by British Army after the British got the lease of New Territories from the Qing in 1899.

It is unclear after whom the road is named. While some claimed William John Anderson, Controller of Stores in Government Supplies of Hong Kong Government, others believe unlikely as Anderson Road was named by 1924, 14 years before the appointment of the person. Another likely origin is Charles Alexander Anderson, Commander British Troops in Southern China who proposed the construction of passage between Customs Pass (now near Fei Ngo Shan Road) and Devil's Peak to move the troops, which resembles much of the old Anderson Road.

The original road was longer than at present. After reaching Lau Tong, present-day Ma Yau Tong, it ran south to western slope of Black Hill and Hai Wan (present-day Chiu Keng Wan Shan). It further went south to near the top of Devil's Peak and ended near Sam Ka Tsun (present-day Sam Ka Tsuen). This road section later partly overlapped with the Stage 3 of Wilson Trail, and part of the final section to Sam Ka Tsuen is now an access road to the Junk Bay Chinese Permanent Cemetery.

The road was described in military materials as "a road suitable for manhandled guns".

In the 1950s, when the Hong Kong Government sent Kuomintang refugees to the area of Rennie's Mill, some churches were built along part of the road, which was extended from the southern end of the present-day Anderson Road to the present-day Po Lam Road South). Until the late 1980s, this road was only used by residents of Rennie's Mill.

In the late 1980s, when the first two public housing estates in Po Lam, Tseung Kwan O New Town – Po Lam Estate and Tsui Lam Estate were built, it was the only link to Po Lam until the Tseung Kwan O Tunnel was opened in 1990. Nowadays, although Po Lam Road is no longer the main road to Tseung Kwan O, some bus routes from Tseung Kwan O still use Po Lam Road.

== Facilities ==
Only a few stores, farmland, the quarry and warehouses are located beside the road. Haven of Hope Sunnyside School is sited at the Po Lam end of the road.

== Public transport ==
Since the 1996 cancellation of KMB Bus Route 90 (Tiu Keng Leng<->Choi Hung), no public transport routes use Anderson Road. However, buses via Po Lam Road and Clear Water Bay Road include the Anderson Road bus stop.

== See also ==
- List of streets and roads in Hong Kong
- Tai Sheung Tok
- On Tat Estate and On Tai Estate
