= Sau Mau Ping =

Area part of Kwun Tong District, Hong Kong SAR

Coordinates: 22°19′10″N 114°14′05″E

- Traditional Chinese: 秀茂坪
Transcriptions
Standard Mandarin
- Hanyu Pinyin: Xiù Mào Píng
Yue: Cantonese
- Jyutping: Sau3 Mau6 Ping4

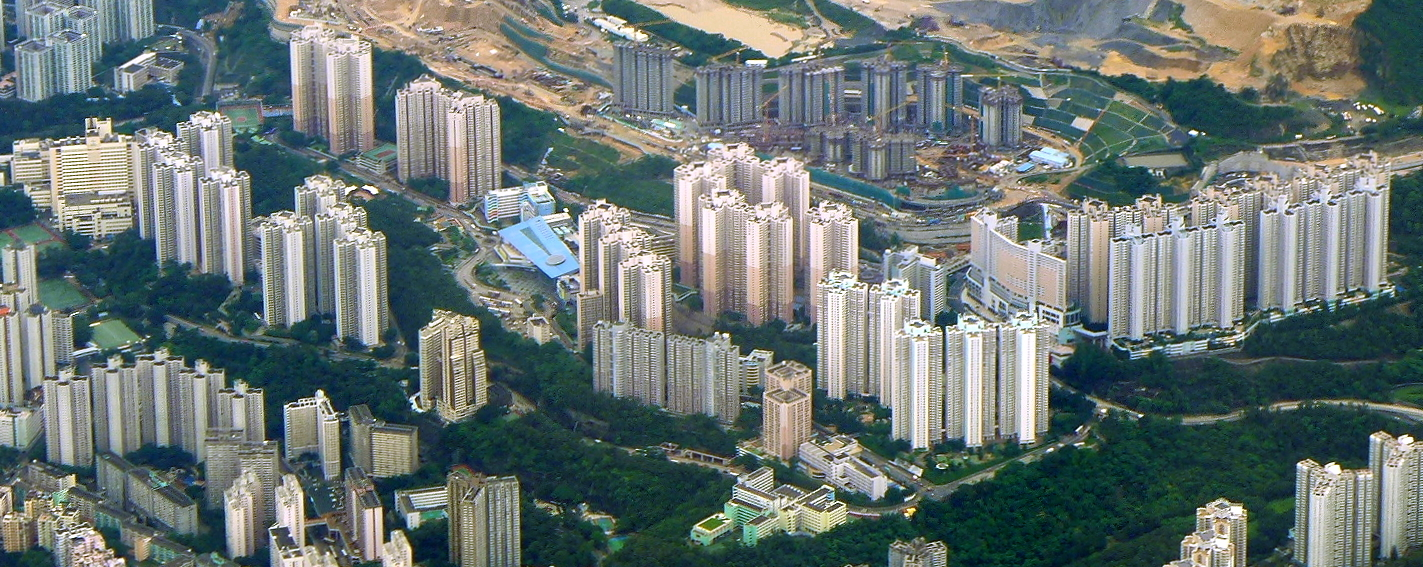
Sau Mau Ping

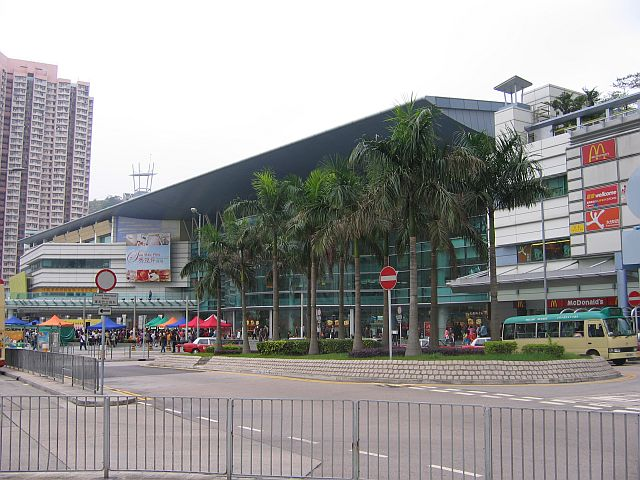
Sau Mau Ping Shopping Centre

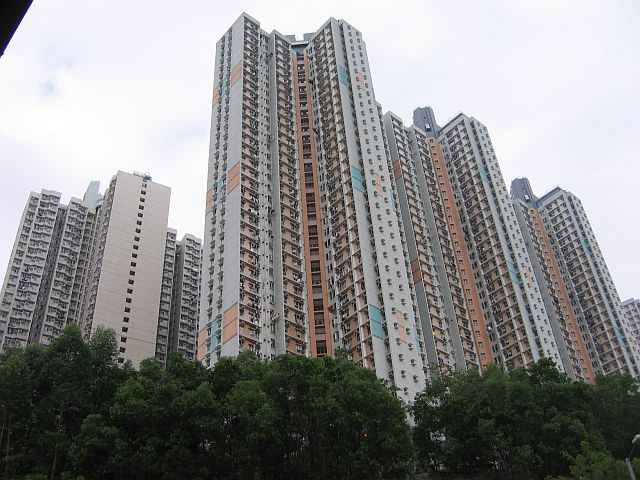
Po Tat Estate

Sau Mau Ping (Chinese: 秀茂坪) is an area part of Kwun Tong District, in eastern Kowloon, Hong Kong.

== Name ==
Its Chinese name was formerly So Mau Ping (蘇茅坪), but this was often mis-rendered So Mo Ping (掃墓坪), meaning a place to 'visit one's ancestors'. In fact, during World War II, much of the area was used as a cemetery. The Chinese name was considered inappropriate for a residential area and so it was changed to the current one, meaning "nice and prosperous".

== History ==
In August 1976, eighteen people were killed in one landslip in Sau Mau Ping, as a consequence of tropical storm Ellen.

== Features ==
Sau Mau Ping was part of the early Kwun Tong satellite city in Hong Kong. Sau Mau Ping Estate, Hiu Lai Court and Po Tat Estate are major public housing estates in the area. There is a shopping mall below Po Tat Estate.

The United Christian Hospital, serving all of eastern Kowloon, is located in Sau Mau Ping. The hospital was founded in 1973 and is currently undergoing a major expansion scheduled for completion in 2023.

== Education ==
Sau Mau Ping is in Primary One Admission (POA) School Net 48. Within the school net are multiple aided schools (operated independently but funded with government money) and Kwun Tong Government Primary School.

Hong Kong Public Libraries maintains the Sau Mau Ping Public Library in Sau Mau Ping Estate.

== Transportation ==
Roads

- On Sau Road runs through Sau Mau Ping
- Sau Mau Ping Road
- Hiu Kwong Street
- Tseung Kwan O Tunnel links Sau Mau Ping to Tseung Kwan O

MTR

Current nearest station is Kwun Tong station, which can take minibus or bus to travel. The East Kowloon line was proposed as a new MTR line in 2014, with a recommended completion time in 2025 to 2030. The new line would include the Sau Mau Ping station and Po Tat station, serving the area.

== See also ==
- List of places in Hong Kong
