= Ippudo =

Japanese ramen restaurant chain

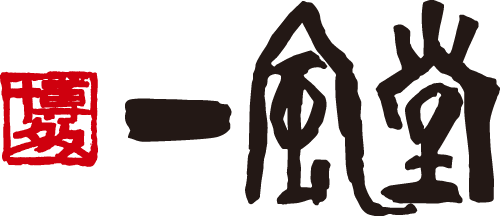

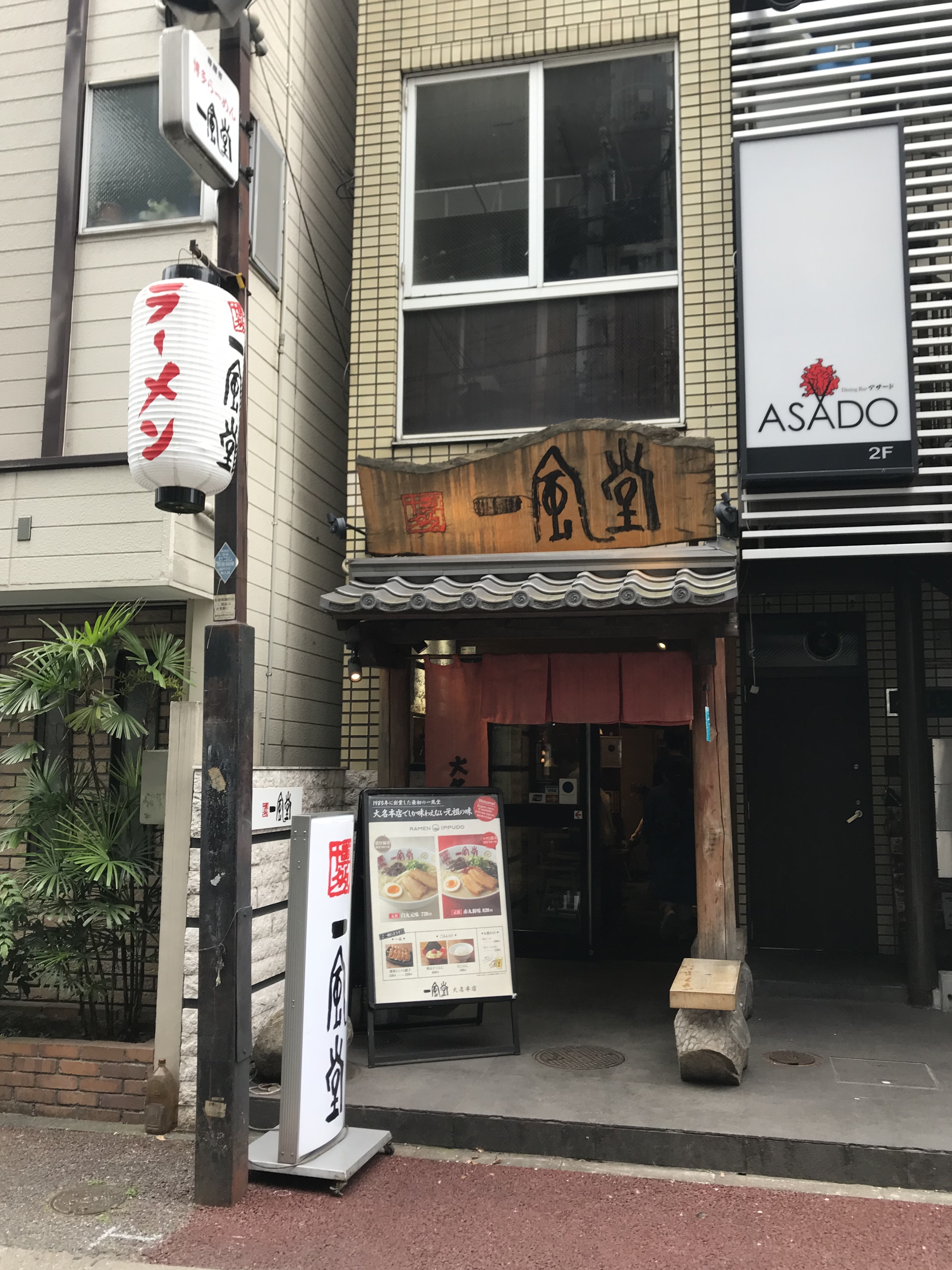
- Main store in Daimyo, Fukuoka, Japan
- Native name: 博多一風堂
- Traded as: TYO: 3561
- Industry: Foodservice
- Founded: 1985; 41 years ago
- Headquarters: Fukuoka, Japan
- Parent: Chikaranomoto Holdings Co,, Ltd.
- Website: www.ippudo.com

Ippudo, also known as Hakata Ippūdō (博多一風堂) in Japan, is a Japanese fancy-ramen restaurant chain with locations worldwide. Ippudo is well known for its tonkotsu ramen, and has been described as "the most famous tonkotsu ramen shop in the country".

== History ==
Ippudo was started in Fukuoka by Shigemi Kawahara, the CEO of Chikaranomoto Company. "Ippudo" in direct translation means "one wind hall". This is because at the time, there were dark clouds over the Kyushu ramen industry, and the founder and CEO intended to "blow wind and revolutionise the era".

The first restaurant opened in 1985, in the Daimyo District of Chuo Ward, in Fukuoka City. Gradually the number of restaurants expanded from regional areas to the whole of Japan, mainly in the Kanto and Kansai regions. In 2000, as a tie-up with 7-Eleven, a cup noodle version was made by Nissin Foods.

In 2008, the first overseas restaurant opened in New York City's East Village, with another location in Midtown West opening in 2013. Ippudo NY has been praised many times in the press for its ramen bowls. Ippudo expanded into Singapore in 2009 with a restaurant in the Mandarin Gallery section of the 5-star Mandarin Orchard Singapore hotel, while a second restaurant, Ippudo Tao, was opened in 2010 at UE Square. In 2013, it was re-branded as Ippudo SG @ Mohamed Sultan. On 18 July 2011, Ippudo officially opened their Hong Kong branch in Silvercord, Tsim Sha Tsui.

In 2014, Ippudo opened its first European restaurant in Central Saint Giles in London. The same year, Ippudo first entered the Philippine market with its first branch at SM Megamall. It has since been succeeded by other branches across Metro Manila.

== 2022 Animal Cruelty Campaign ==
Ippudo restaurants have been targeted by a campaign claiming they use animal cruelty in their supply chain in Hong Kong and Taiwan. This campaign claims Ippudo restaurants in Hong Kong and Taiwan use eggs from battery cages that are banned by the European Union Council Directive 1999/74/EC. Ippudo restaurants in Hong Kong and Taiwan are operated under Maxim's Caterers who were the main targets of this campaign. The campaign has targeted other restaurants under Maxim’s Caterers such as Maxim's MX, Genki Sushi, and Arome Bakery so far.

== Locations ==
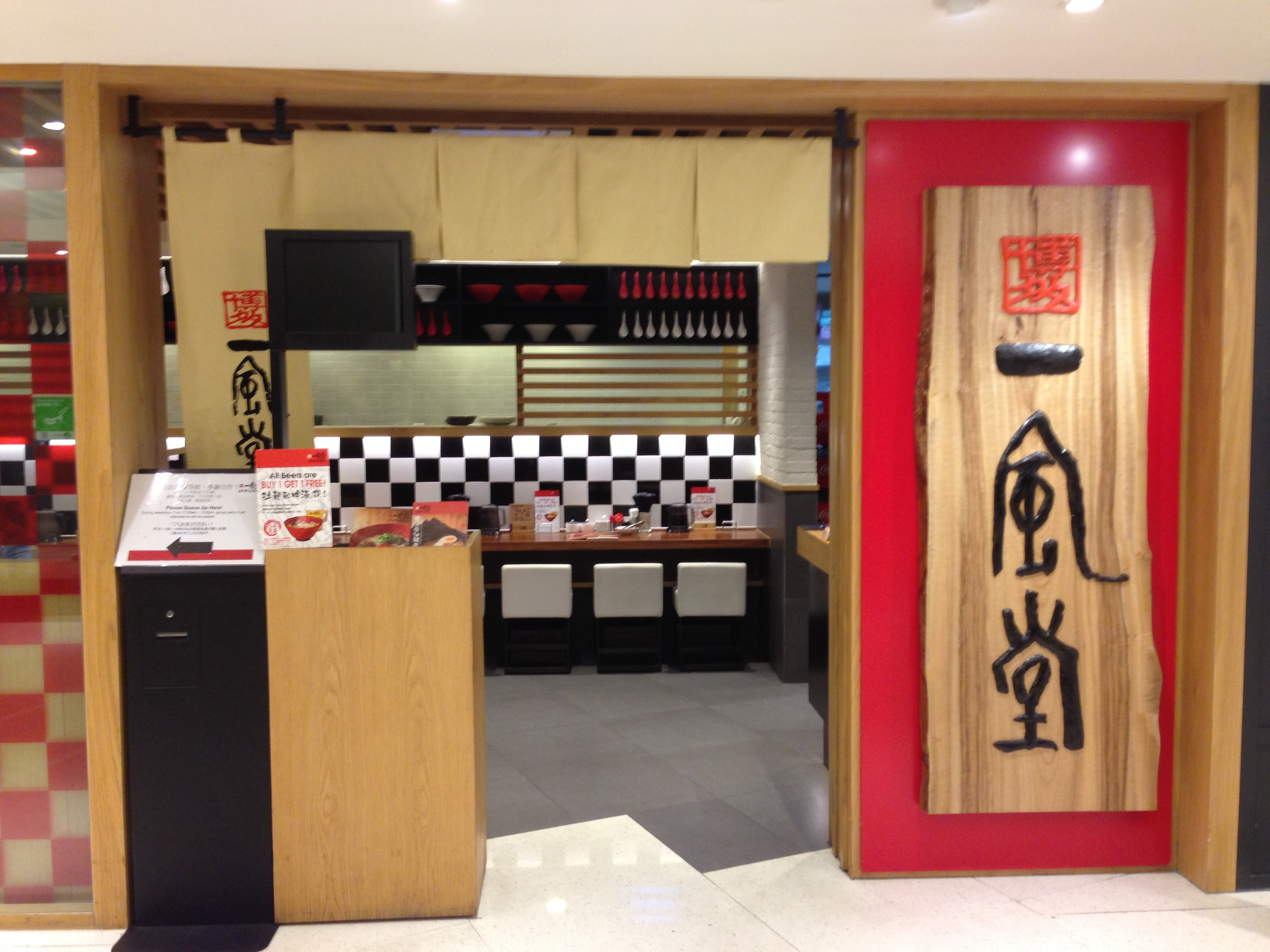
The entrance to Ippudo Hong Kong's Admiralty branch

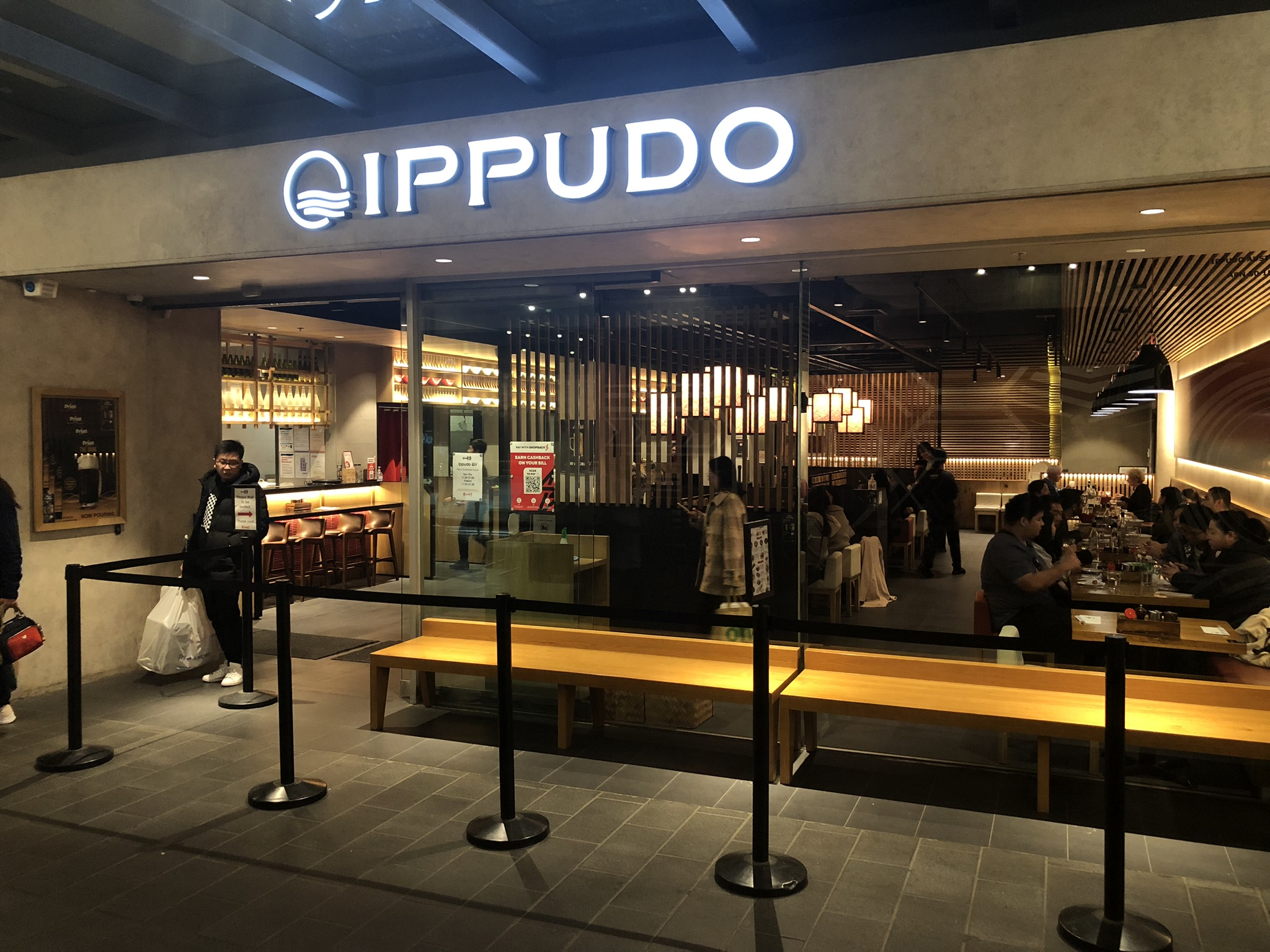
Ippudo in QV, Melbourne

Asia

- China: Beijing, Guangzhou, Shanghai, Shenzhen
- Vietnam: Ho Chi Minh City
- Hong Kong
- Indonesia: Jakarta, Surabaya
- Japan
- Malaysia: Kuala Lumpur, Penang
- Myanmar: Yangon
- Philippines: Manila
- Singapore
- Taiwan: Kaohsiung, Tainan, Taipei
- Thailand: Bangkok

Oceania

- Australia: Sydney, Perth, Melbourne
- New Zealand: Auckland

Europe

- France: Paris
- Spain: Barcelona
- United Kingdom: London

North America

- USA: Cupertino, Berkeley, San Francisco, New York City, West Hollywood, Culver City

== See also ==
- Ramen shop
