= Maxim's Caterers =

Hong Kong food company

Maxim's Caterers Limited
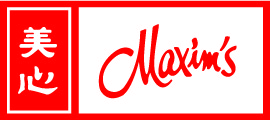
- Type: Private company
- Industry: Food and Beverage
- Founded: 1956; 70 years ago
- Founder: S.T. Wu & James Wu
- Headquarters: 18/F, Maxim's Centre, 17 Cheung Shun Street; Cheung Sha Wan, Kowloon
- Products: Chinese cuisine Western cuisine Asian cuisine Fast food Bakery; Starbucks; Genki Sushi
- Revenue: HK$20.27bn in the 2018 calendar year)
- Net income: HC reported a net profit for 2018 of HK$893.1m
- Number of employees: 24,000
- Parent: HongKong Caterers and Dairy Farm International Holdings Limited (50/50 shareholders)
- Website: www.maxims.com.hk

Maxim's Caterers Limited (Chinese: 美心食品有限公司; Cantonese Yale: Méihsām Sihkbán Yáuhhaahn Gūngsī) is a Hong Kong–based food, beverage and restaurant chain jointly owned by Dairy Farm International Holdings Limited and Hong Kong Caterers Ltd, and founded by Wu Shun Tak and James Wu, overseas Chinese businessmen brothers in the United States with ancestral roots in Taishan, Guangdong.

It is 50% owned by Jardine Matheson through its subsidiary DFI Retail Group, but the decision-making power is still owned by the Ng family. It now operates in Hong Kong, Macau, Mainland China, Vietnam, Thailand and Singapore.

Founded in 1956, the company operates over 1,000 outlets in Hong Kong, mainland China, Cambodia and Vietnam. These include bakeries, fast food shops restaurants and Starbucks coffee shop licences. Maxim's restaurants have been targeted by conservation campaigners concerned with Maxim's previous sale of shark fins, and for controversial comments made by Annie Wu, daughter of one of Maxim's founders, during the 2019–2020 Hong Kong protests.

Maxim's Group operates a diverse portfolio of food and beverage businesses in Hong Kong, covering Chinese, Western, Japanese, Thai, and Vietnamese cuisines. In addition to full-service restaurants, the Group also runs fast food outlets（Maxim's MX） and bakeries under brands such as Maxim's Bakery and Arome Bakery. It holds franchise rights for international brands including Starbucks Coffee and Genki Sushi, further broadening its market presence. Maxim's also provides professional catering services to a wide range of clients, including industrial, commercial, educational institutions, and hospitals. The Group is known for its festive offerings as well, producing seasonal delicacies such as Chinese New Year puddings, Dragon Boat Festival Zongzi, traditional Chinese sausages and preserved meats, as well as Mid-Autumn Festival mooncakes.

Maxim's mission is to become a "Triple-Benefit Company," bringing benefits to employees, customers, and employers alike.

According to estimates by independent stock analyst David Webb, Maxim’s revenue reached HKD 16.2 billion in 2018, accounting for one-seventh, or approximately 13.5%, of Hong Kong’s total catering industry revenue of HKD 119.6 billion that year. He also pointed out that Maxim’s scale was larger than the combined size of Café de Coral and Fairwood.

The Maxim's de Paris restaurant, founded in Paris, France, Macau Maxim Bakery Co., Ltd., and Maxim Bakery & Restaurant in Vancouver, Canada, have no business affiliation with Hong Kong Maxim's Caterers Limited.

== History ==
Maxim's was founded by brothers James Wu and S.T. Wu along with a small group of shareholders. The grand opening of the first Maxim's restaurant, located in the basement of Telephone House in Central, took place on 3 December 1956. Initially positioned as a "first-class restaurant and night-club", the arrival of competing international hoteliers in the 1960s prompted the company to focus more on morning tea, lunch, and snacks.

A holding company, Maxim's Caterers Limited, was formed in October 1972 to acquire the Maxim's and Jade Garden restaurant brands. By early 1973, the group operated 15 restaurants.

Longtime company managing director S.T. Wu stepped down in early 2000, and was replaced by his 29-year-old grandson Michael Wu Wei-kuo, who had previously served as chief financial officer.

=== The Woo Brothers' Entrepreneurship ===
In 1956, Wu Shun Tak and James Wu, who were then managing the Queen's Theatre on behalf of the prominent Chinese business conglomerate Loong Hoi Tong, were inspired to start their own Western-style restaurant after an unpleasant dining experience at the New Paris Café (Café de Paris) located at 8 Queen's Road Central. Motivated by this encounter, the Woo brothers opened the first Maxim’s Western restaurant — "Maxim's Restaurant" — at Café Wiseman, a venue nicknamed “the smart people’s restaurant,” located in the basement of The Landmark (Hong Kong) on Des Voeux Road Central. Operated in the style of a nightclub and frequently hosting large-scale performances, the restaurant quickly became a hotspot for celebrities and high society, laying the foundation for the Maxim’s Group in the food and beverage industry. The Woo brothers put great effort into preparing for the launch of their restaurant. Inspired by Café de Paris, they included a dance floor and hired a live band to enhance the dining experience. They also emphasized food and service quality by recruiting experienced French chefs and ensuring the freshness of ingredients. Having once experienced poor service themselves, they placed particular importance on courteous, attentive hospitality, making it a core value of their restaurant. James Wu recalled that in the 1950s, Western restaurants in Hong Kong were much like their counterparts abroad — they did not serve hot tea. However, at Maxim’s Restaurant, as soon as a Chinese customer was seated, they would be offered a cup of hot tea, since Chinese diners typically had little interest in a glass of cold water. At that time, most Western restaurants only placed a single box of matches on the table, but Maxim’s took extra care by ensuring every waiter carried a lighter. Whenever a guest lit a cigarette, a waiter would promptly step forward to offer assistance. This thoughtful service left a positive impression and delighted many customers. In the early days of the restaurant’s operation, a number of foreign performers were hired as resident entertainers to attract customers.

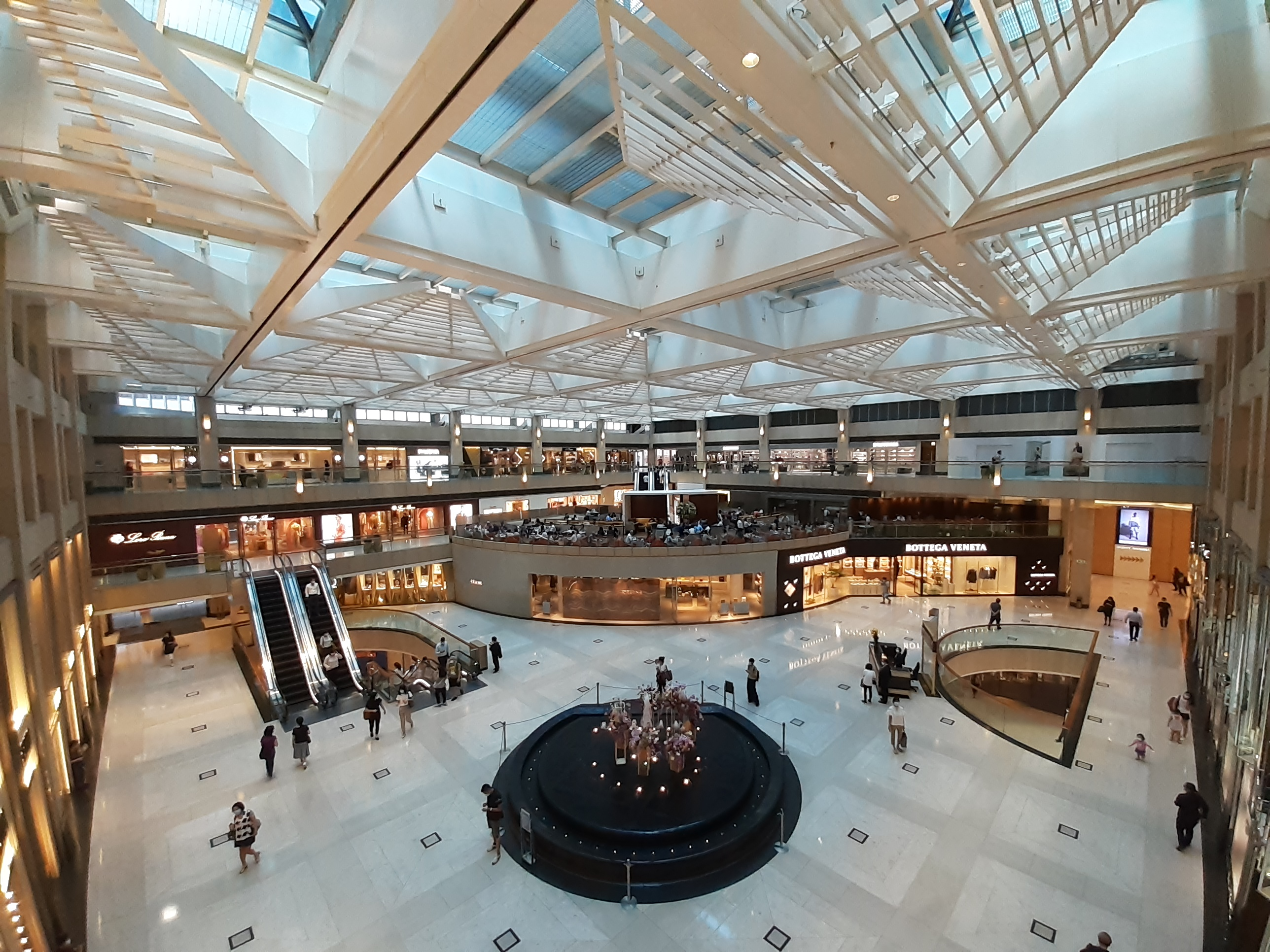
The original site of the Maxim’s restaurant has now become the atrium of The Landmark.

In 1963, the Hilton Hotel and the Mandarin Hotel opened one after another in Central, Hong Kong, both featuring Western-style nightclub dining. At the time, Maxim’s Group also operated a high-end Western nightclub in Central, but found itself unable to compete in terms of décor, hired singers, and other aspects. As a result, the group decided to close the nightclub and shift its focus to opening coffee shops.

In 1966, the completion of Ocean Terminal marked the opening of the first Maxim’s Café, **Maxim's Boulevard**, which featured a French restaurant and a British-style Mermaid Bar. Later, pastries were also sold, forming the prototype of what would become "Maxim’s Cakes." After transforming into a coffee restaurant business, Maxim’s opened 20 café-style restaurants within two years.

By 1969, Hong Kong Food Products Ltd. had already opened Maxim’s restaurants in locations such as The Landmark,

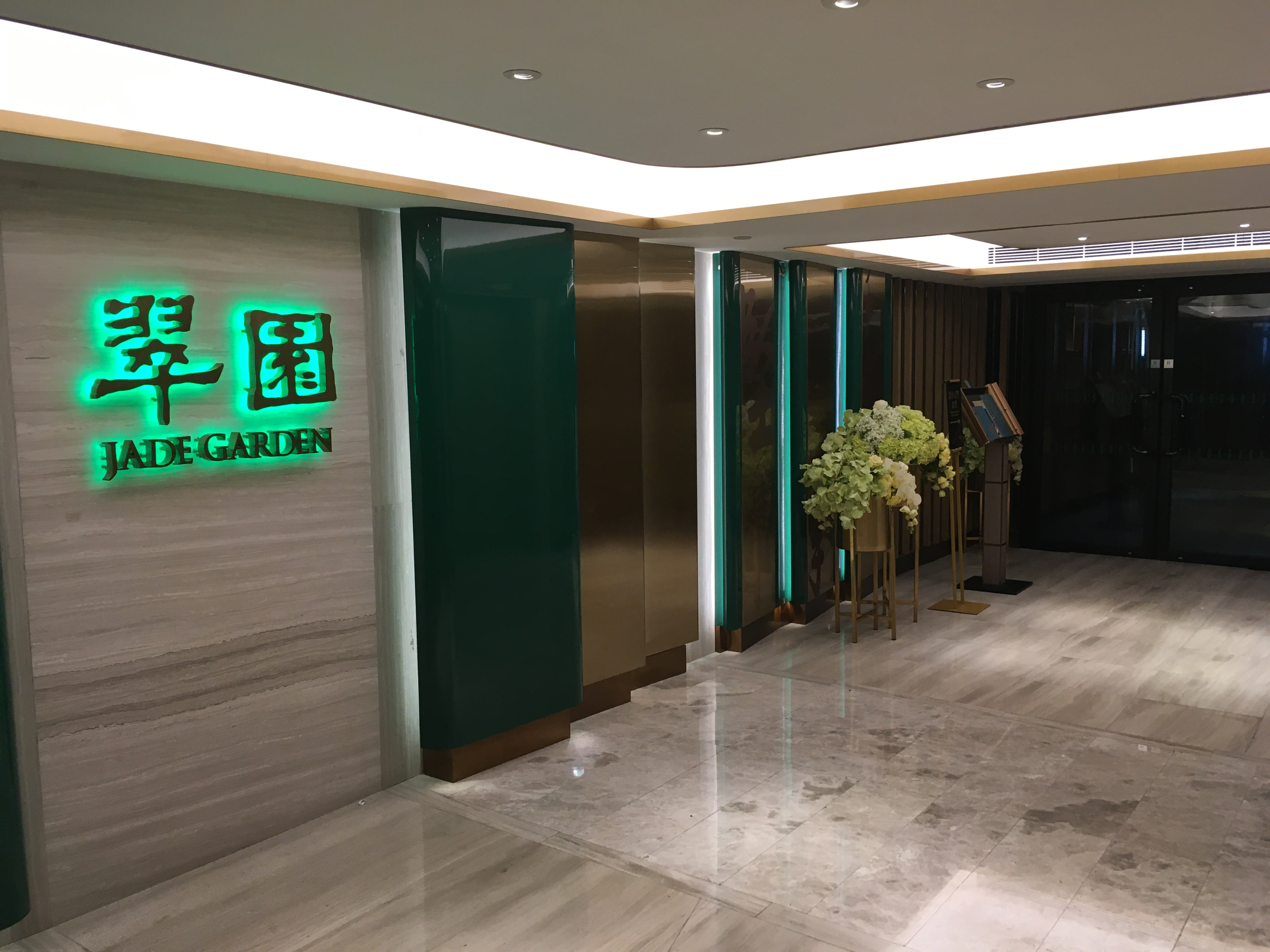
Jade Garden at Star House has been in operation since 1971 and remains open to this day.

Ocean Terminal, Prince’s Building, Wing On House, and International Building.

In 1970, Maxim’s appointed Annie Wu Suk-ching and Wong Shek Leung to participate in the Hong Kong Pavilion at Expo ’70 in Osaka under the brand name "Jade Garden,HongKong." Annie Wu served as the restaurant secretary and promotional ambassador for the pavilion. The exquisite dim sum they provided received widespread acclaim.

On 2 March 1971, Maxim’s opened its first Cantonese restaurant — **Jade Garden,HongKong** — on the 4th floor of Star House in Tsim Sha Tsui. Woo Cham Tak served as general manager, while Wong Shek Leung was the head chef. The restaurant introduced an innovative management model of “Chinese cuisine with Western-style service,” which included selling Western-style pastries in the restaurant and eliminating traditional table-sharing practices.

=== Jardine Matheson acquired a stake ===
In 1972, during the Dairy Farm acquisition battle, Woo Shun Tak earned the admiration of Henry Keswick, then Chairman of the Board at Jardine Matheson. Two months later, Jardine's subsidiary, Hongkong Land, became a shareholder of Maxim’s. However, decision-making power has remained with the Woo family to this day. Soon after, Maxim’s rapidly expanded by opening numerous restaurants in properties owned by Hongkong Land, such as Jardine House, Landmark, Exchange Square, and the Hong Kong World Trade Centre.

In the same year, the first Maxim’s Fast Food (now known as Maxim’s MX) was established, and it gradually developed into one of the largest Hong Kong-style fast food chains in the city.

Following the successful operation of Jade Garden,HongKong, Maxim’s further expanded in the late 1970s by opening multiple branches of Peking Garden, marking its entry into the business of regional Chinese cuisine restaurants, including those serving Beijing, Sichuan, Shanghai, and Hunan dishes. In the 1980s, Maxim’s opened two Japanese restaurants: BenkeiJapanese Cuisine in the basement of The Landmark, and Momoyama Japanese Cuisine in the basement of Jardine House. Benkei was later renovated at the same location and rebranded successively as Kajiku Japanese Cuisine and Kikusan, while Momoyama was transformed into Miso.

In 1980, Beijing Air Catering Co., Ltd. was established, becoming the first Sino-foreign joint venture after the repurchase of joint ventures such as the Sino-Soviet Civil Aviation Corporation, originally established in 1954.

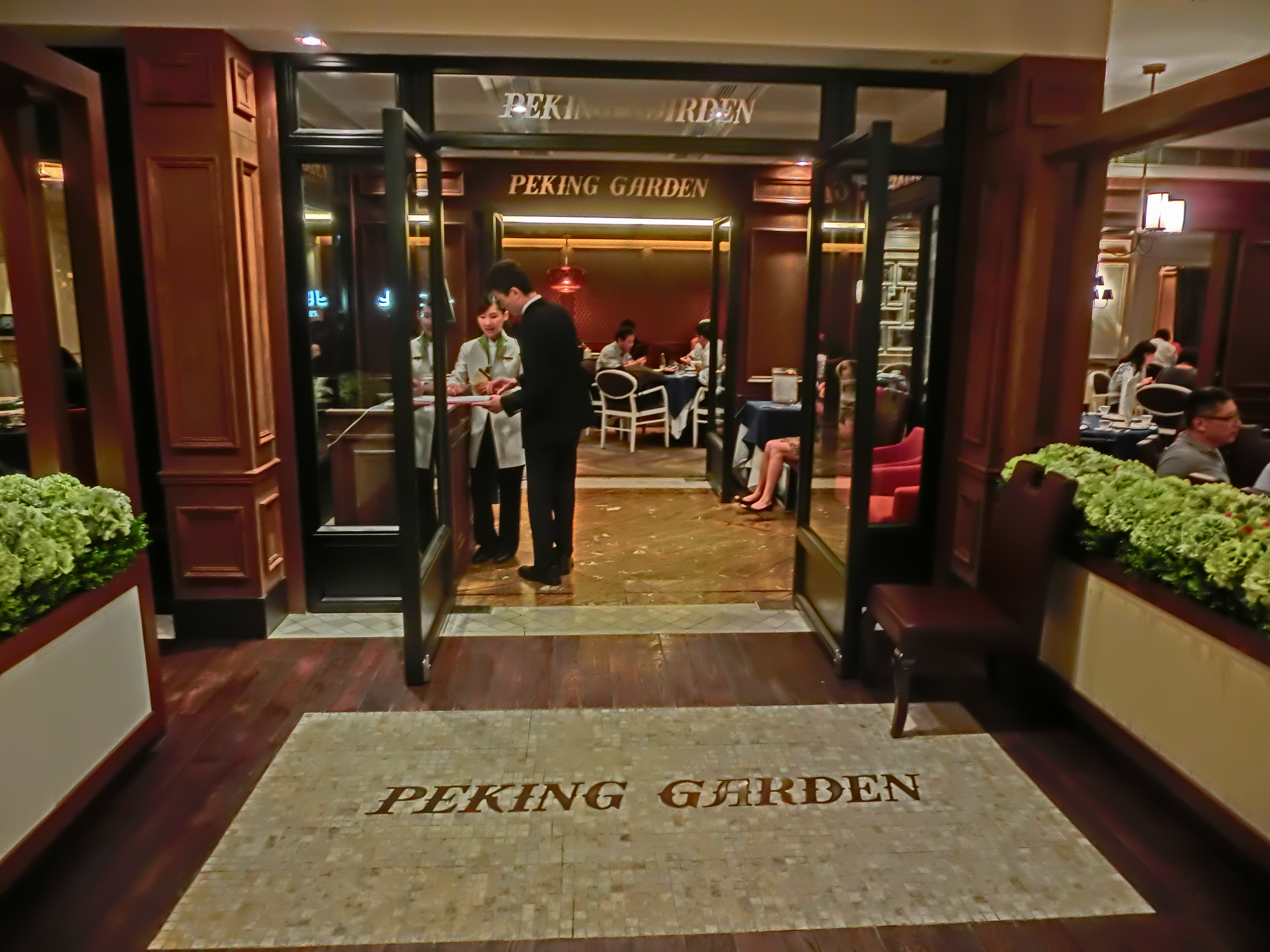
Peking Garden – Pacific Place, Admiralty Branch

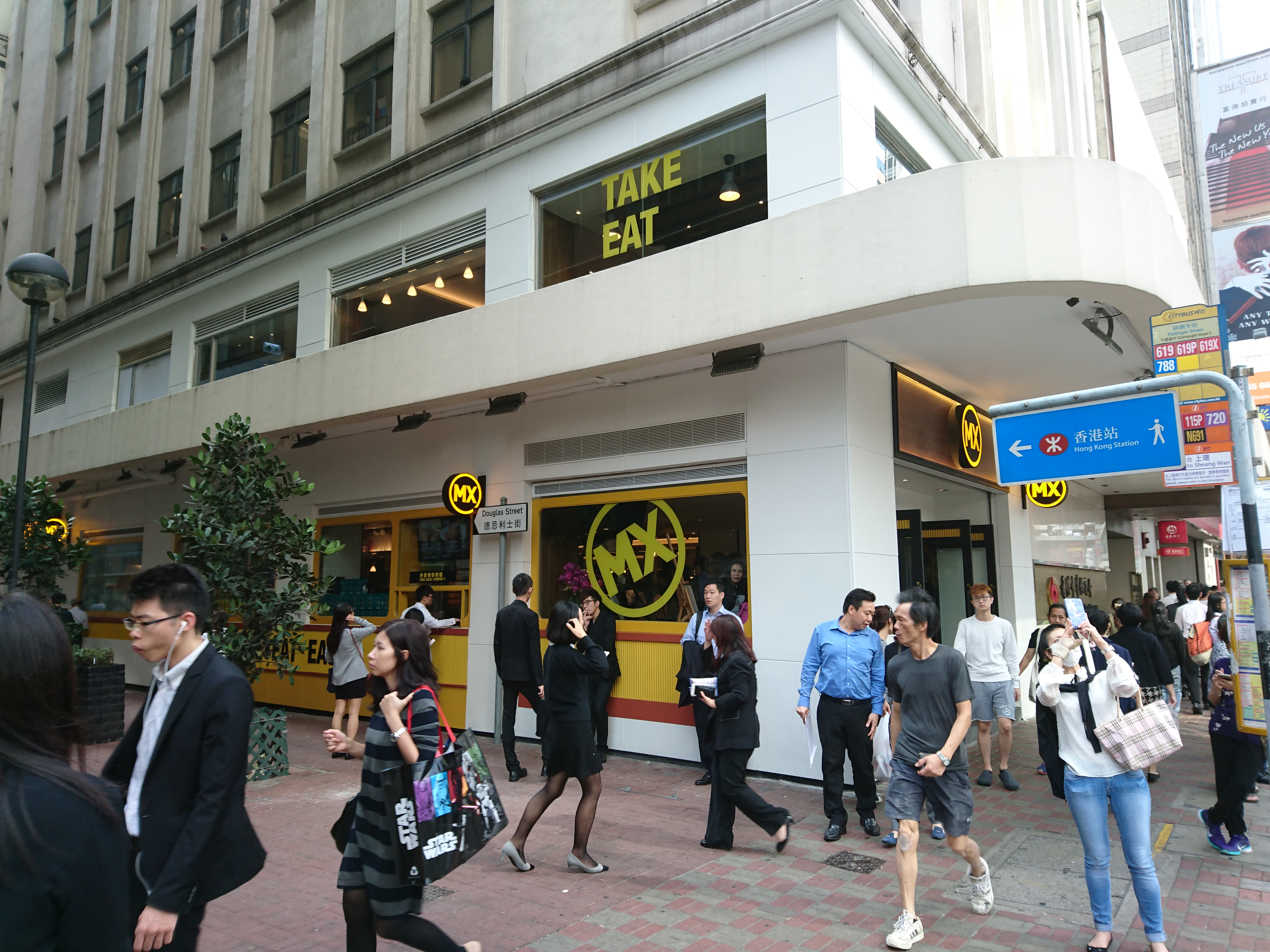
Maxim’s Fast Food – Des Voeux Road Central Branch

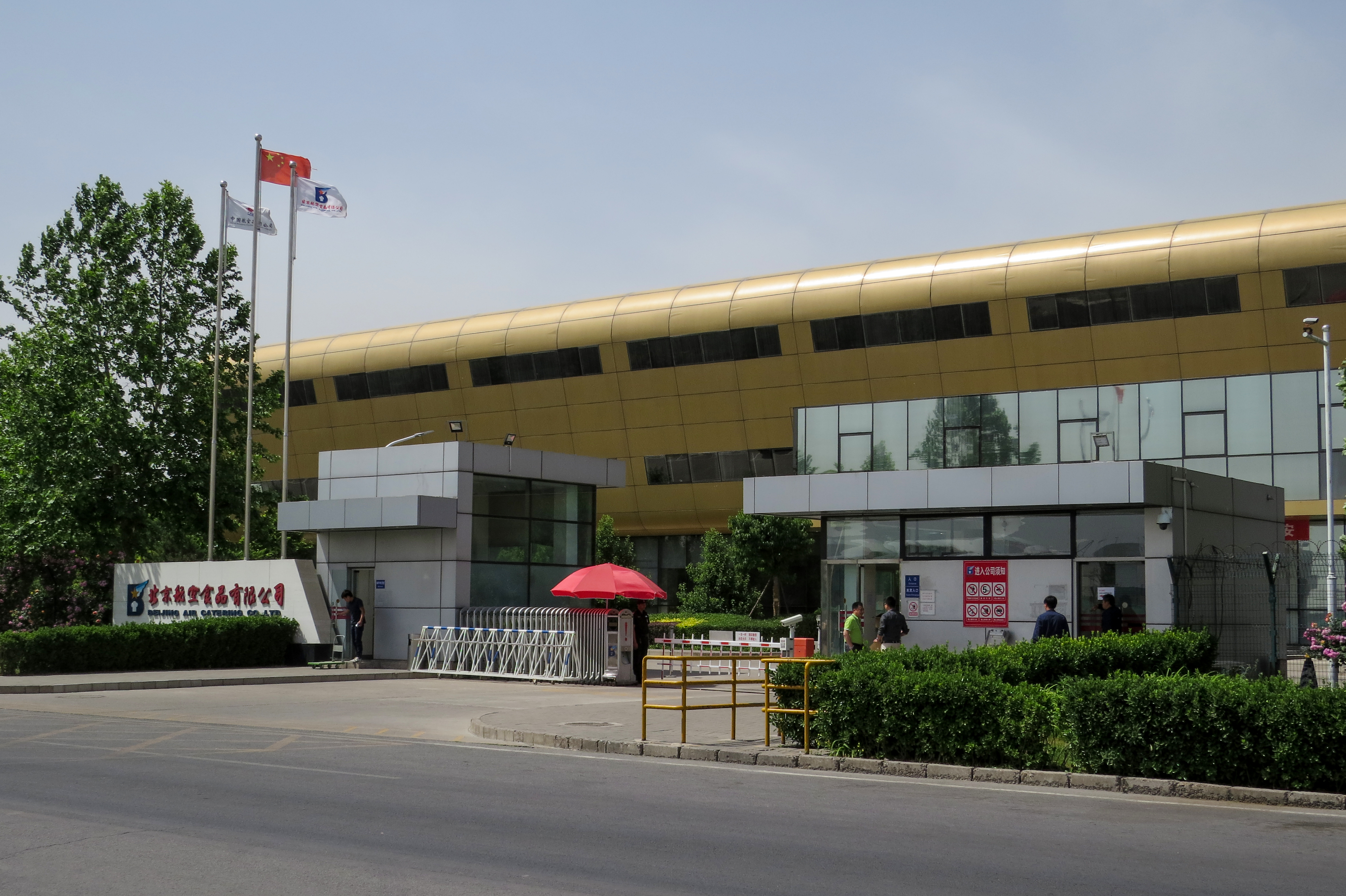
Beijing Air Catering Co., Ltd.

=== Expansion of the mass market ===
Starting from the late 1970s to the early 1980s, Maxim's gradually expanded from focusing solely on the high-end dining market to entering the mass catering sector. They successively opened several Cantonese-style restaurants, such as Maxim's Chinese Restaurant and Maxim's Palace Chinese Restaurant, offering traditional dim sum and banquet services. Later on, Maxim's also launched Chiu Chow Garden Restaurant, venturing into the business of Teochew cuisinerestaurants. In 1982, Maxim's established numerous Maxim's Cakes outlets along the Hong Kong MTR (now known as the MTR) network. By the end of 1985, Maxim's Cakes had 33 branches along the railway lines, and together with 37 outlets outside the MTR stations, it became the largest bakery chain in Hong Kong at the time. In 1988, they further expanded by opening outlets at every station along the Kowloon–Canton Railway (now the MTR East Rail Line).

In 1986, Maxim's ventured into the mooncake market. Although only 100,000 boxes of Maxim's mooncakes were produced, they sold out within just a few days of launch. The Ng brothers were greatly encouraged by this success, and from then on, Maxim's made a major push into the mooncake market. In the same year, Jardine Matheson underwent a corporate restructuring, and its stake in Maxim’s was transferred to its subsidiary, Dairy Farm International Holdings Limited.

In May 1991, Maxim's opened its first restaurant in Mainland China, "Beijing Jade Garden," at the Liangmahe Shopping Mall in Chaoyang District, Beijing. In 1993, Maxim's opened a fast-food restaurant and a bakery in Guangzhou's Huanshi Road and Shanghai's North Sichuan Road, respectively. In 1994, Maxim's further expanded by opening a total of four fast-food outlets and four bakeries in Guangzhou, Foshan, and Shanghai. However, the business in the Chinese market suffered losses, and Maxim's eventually withdrew from the market.

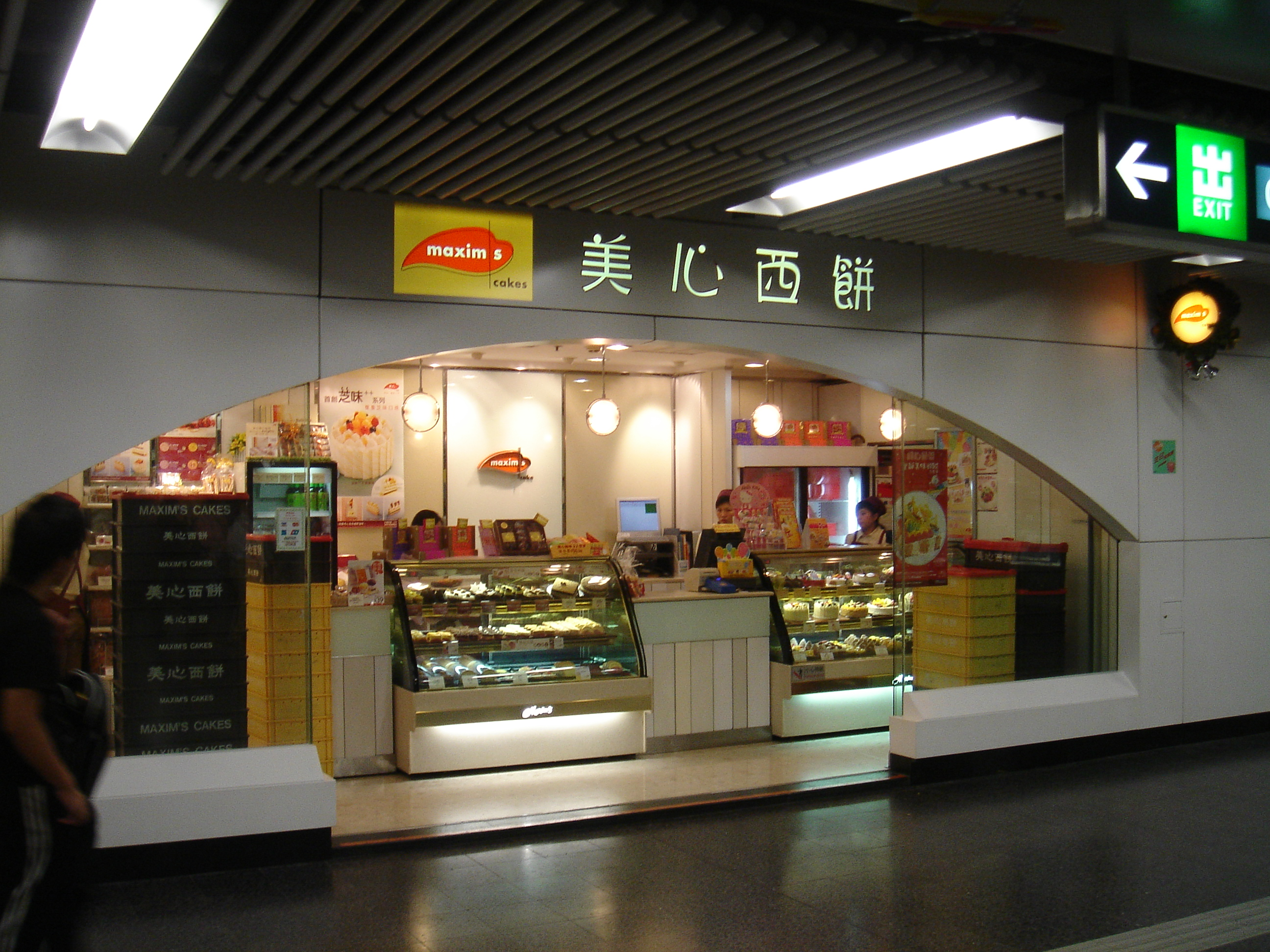
Maxim’s Cakes Tsim Sha Tsui

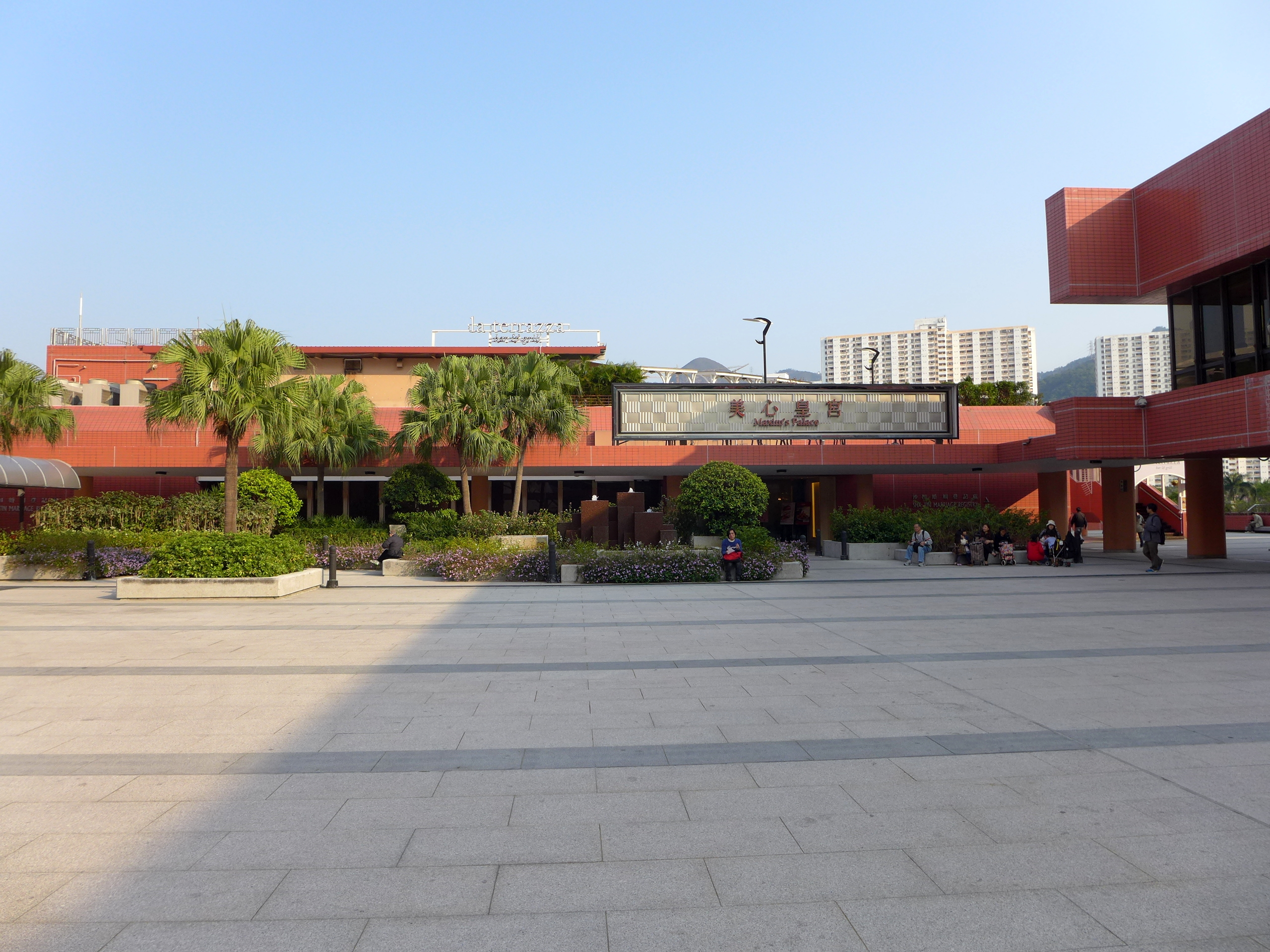
Maxim’s Palace Sha Tin

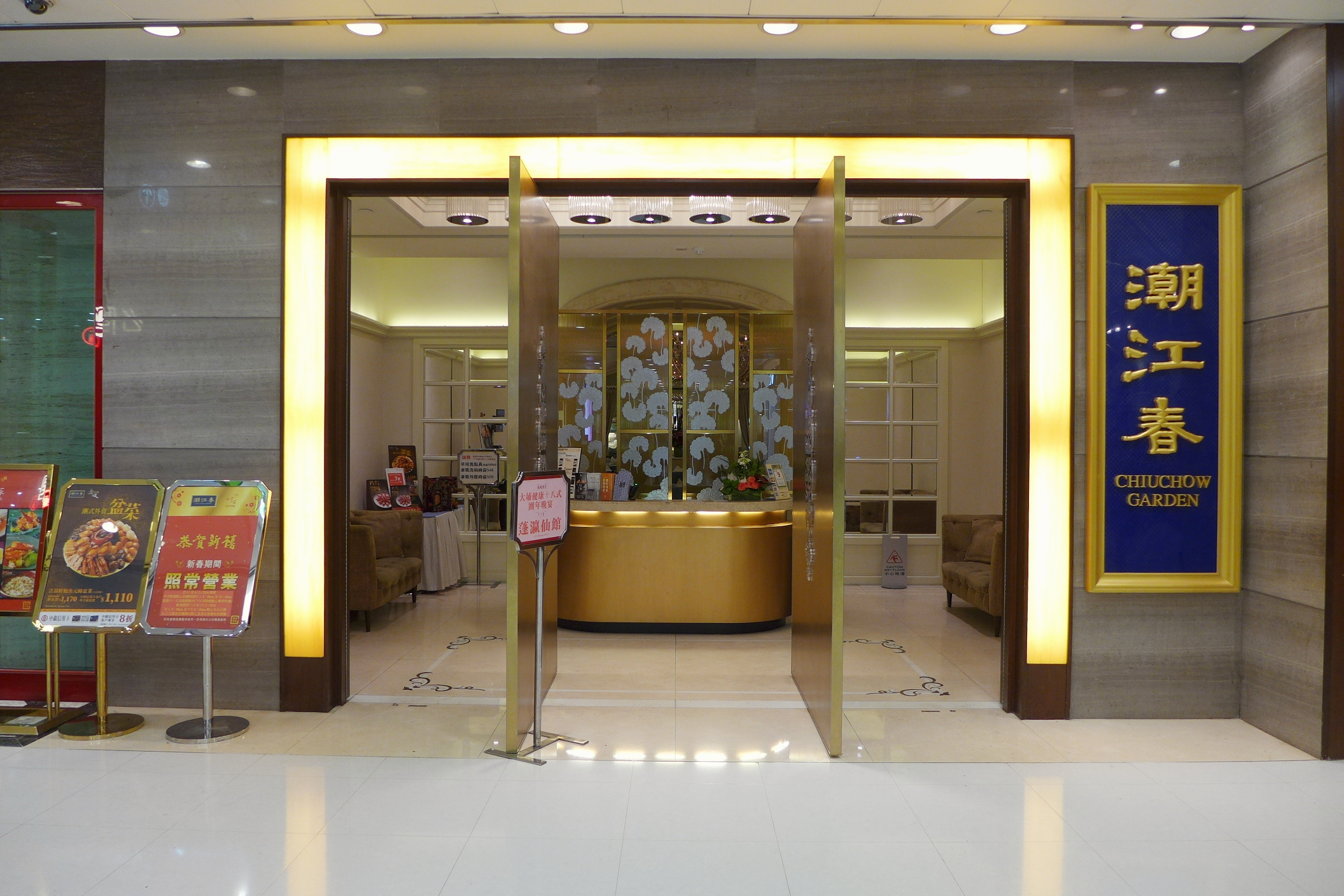
Chiu Chow Garden

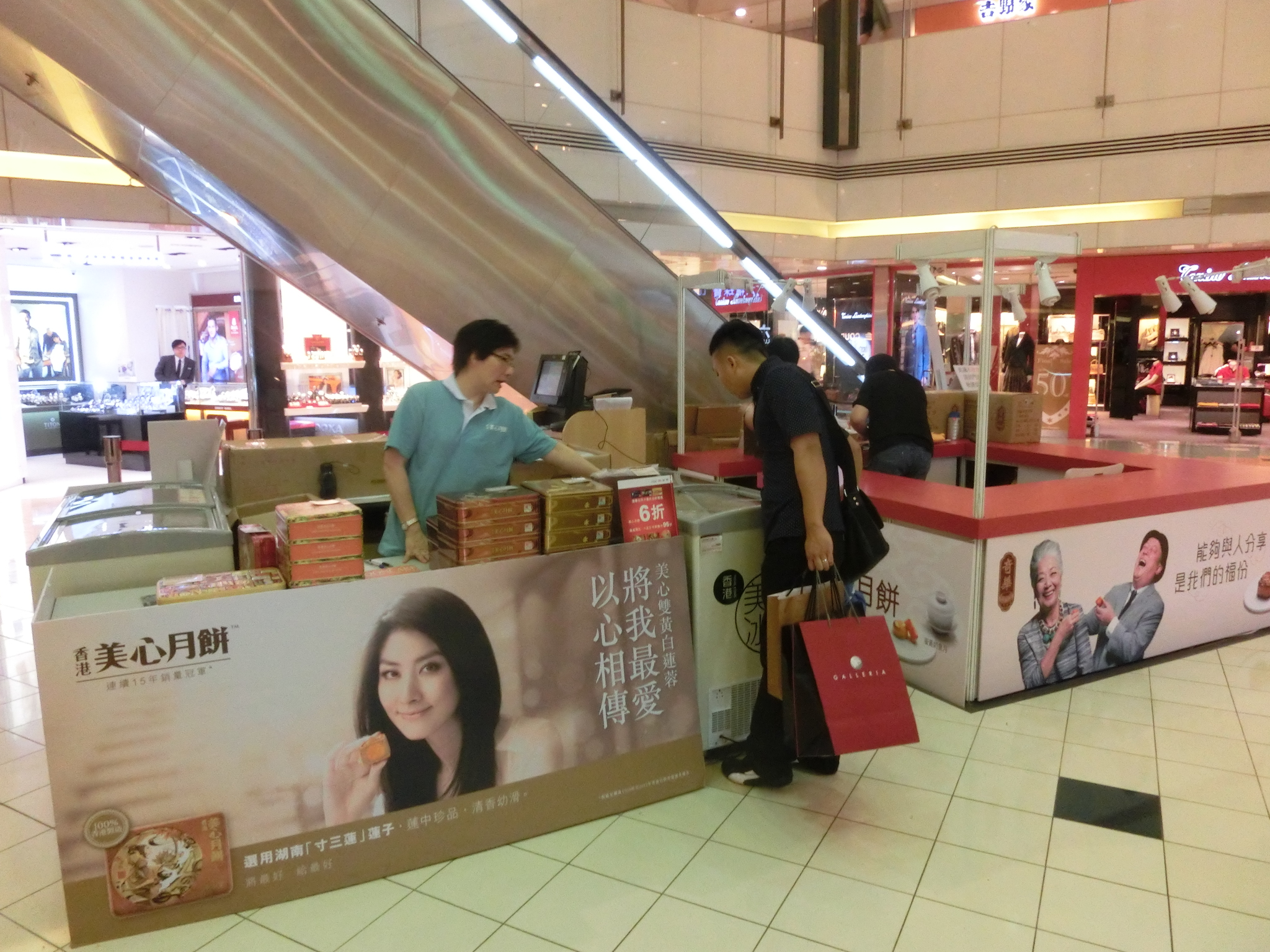
Maxim’s Mooncakes

=== Ng Wai Kwok takes over the helm ===
==== Development of trendy dining brands ====
In 1992, Ng Wai Kwok, the eldest grandson of Ng Shun Tak and a member of the third generation of the Ng family, joined Maxim’s Group at the age of 21. At the time, Maxim’s operated around 300 outlets. In 2000, Ng Wai Kwok was appointed Managing Director of Maxim’s. As early as 1998, he had already established m.a.x. concepts to drive the development of new-style restaurants for Maxim’s. Under this brand, restaurants such as MAX, Cellini, Mecca, Thai Basil, and eating plus were launched, offering customers unique and innovative cuisine. In addition, the previous Japanese restaurants were revamped into Hyo-Kiku and Miso, creating a trend for contemporary Japanese cuisine. Several Chinese restaurants were also rebranded and refreshed, including The Square, Jasmine Place, and Peking Garden.

In September 2005, Hong Kong Disneyland officially opened. Under the leadership of Ng Wai Kwok, Maxim’s secured the operating rights for the Plaza Inn restaurant and the Market House Bakery within the park.

M&C.Duck Gateway Arcade Branch	Treats Food Court at Cityplaza	Maxim’s Foods opens restaurants and bakeries at Hong Kong Disneyland	Simplylife Bakery Cafe Queensway Plaza Branch	Cafe Landmark

==== Introduction of foreign restaurant brands ====
At the same time, Ng Wai Kwok actively worked on bringing well-known international restaurant brands to Hong Kong. The first to collaborate with Maxim’s was Sanrio, opening the Hello Kitty Cafe at Luk Yeung Galleria, followed by three more branches the following year. However, after the initial craze subsided, all outlets were closed. In May 2000, Maxim’s successfully introduced the globally renowned Starbucks coffee culture to Hong Kong by forming a joint venture, Coffee Concepts Ltd. Within the first two months of operation, the venture turned a profit, and in just two years, over 30 coffee shops were established in Hong Kong. By the end of 2002, the brand had expanded into Macau, Shenzhen, and several Southeast Asian countries. In June 2011, Starbucks and Maxim’s signed an agreement under which Starbucks acquired Maxim’s 30% stake in their joint venture, thereby gaining full ownership of its operations in Guangdong, Hainan, Sichuan, Shaanxi, Hubei, and Chongqing. Meanwhile, Maxim’s acquired Starbucks’ remaining shares in the Hong Kong and Macau operations, giving Maxim’s 100% ownership of the Starbucks business in Hong Kong and Macau following the acquisition.

When initially negotiating with Starbucks’ U.S. headquarters, Maxim’s believed that relying solely on selling coffee and cakes, as in places like Canada and Singapore, would not be sufficient. They proposed cooking food on a griddle, but Starbucks U.S. headquarters objected, arguing that it would overpower the aroma of the coffee. Maxim’s then suggested using warming cabinets to heat the food instead, a proposal that was eventually accepted. By offering light lunch options such as sandwiches alongside coffee, Starbucks in Hong Kong quickly achieved profitability.

In addition, Maxim’s also successively acquired the franchise rights for Genki Sushi, Sen-ryo, Arome Bakery, Ippudo, Cheesecake Factory, and Shake Shack burger restaurants.

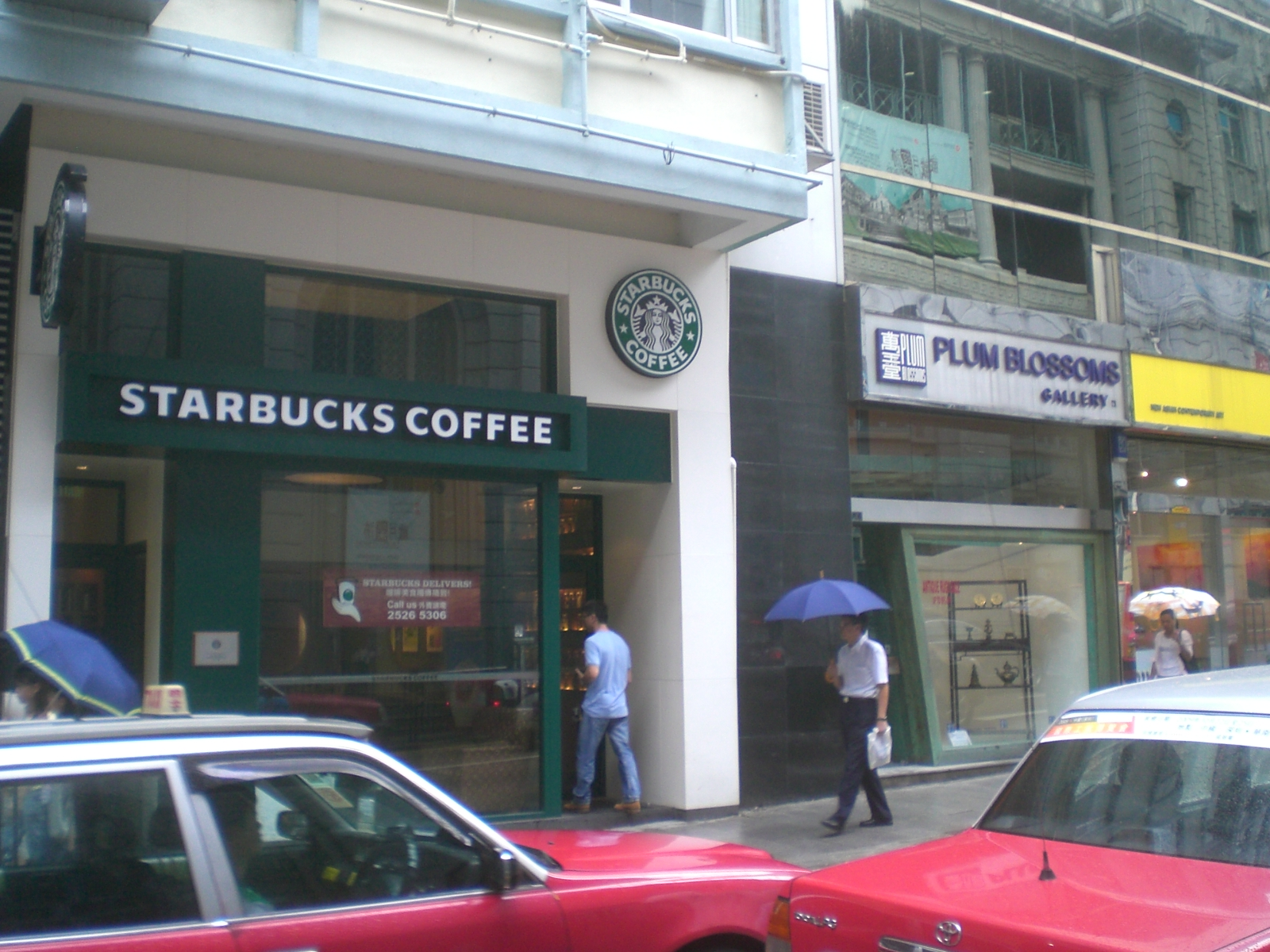
Bringing in Starbucks Coffee Brought Ng Wai Kwok Widespread Fame

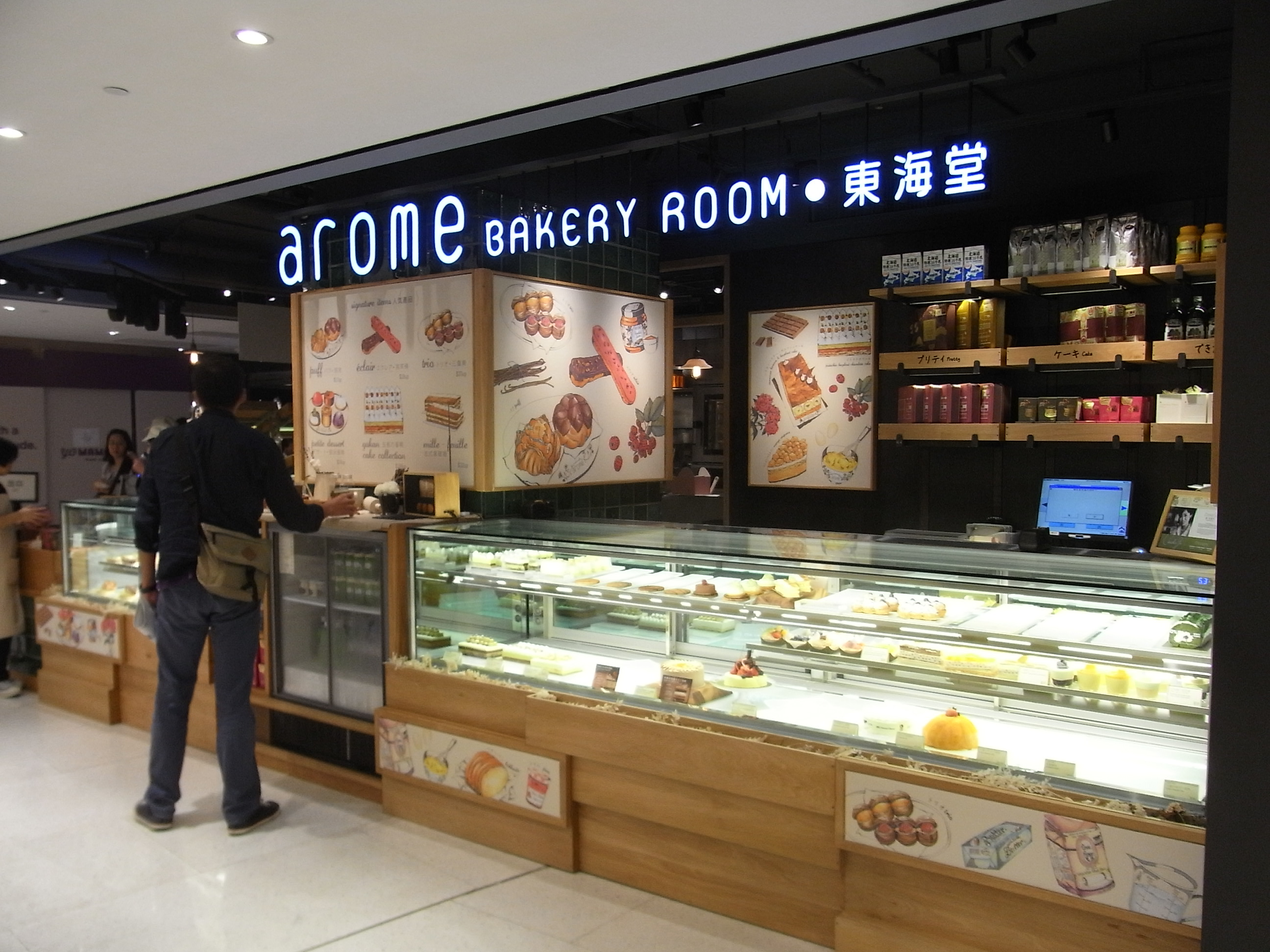
Arome Bakery Admiralty Branch

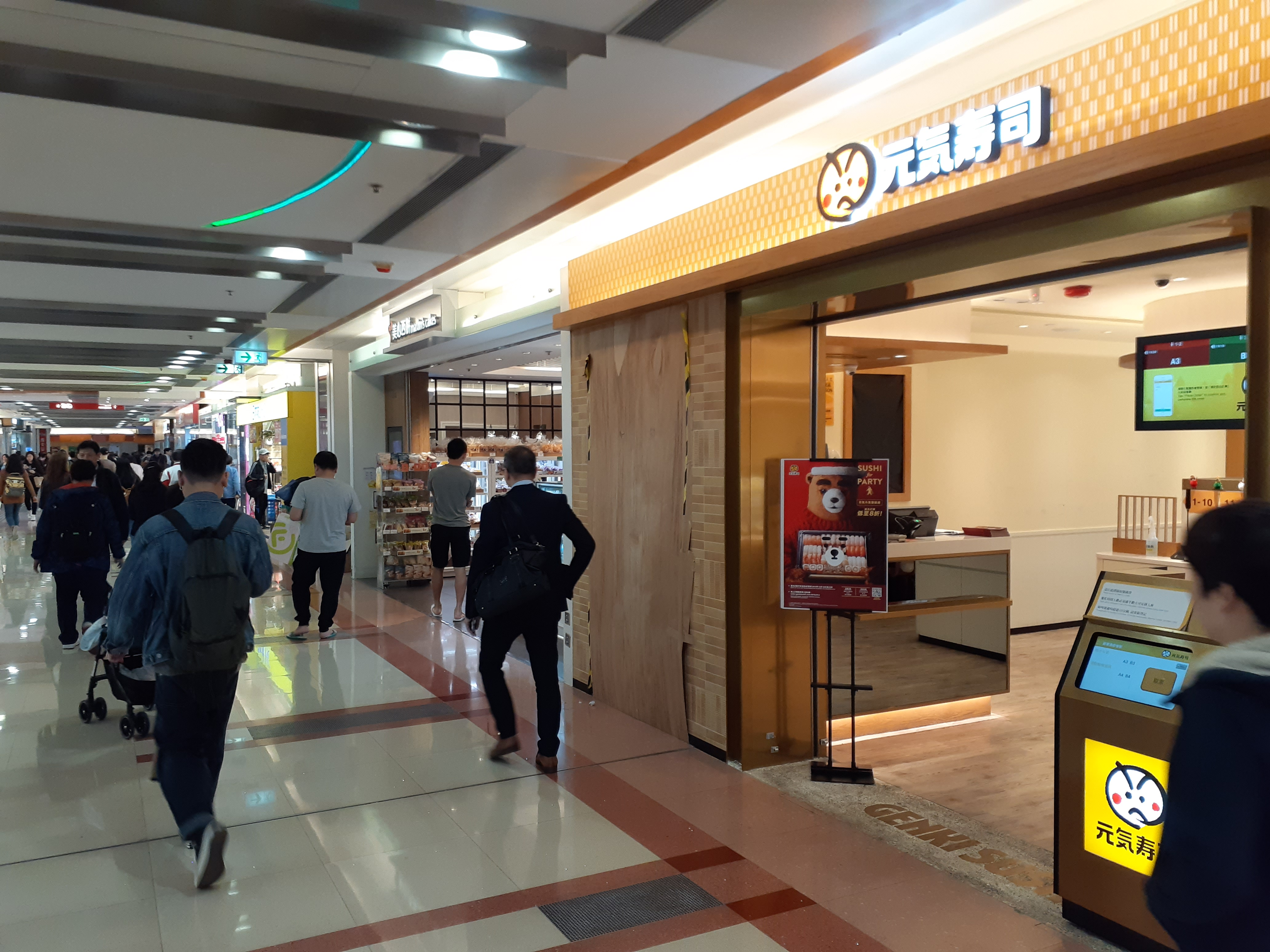
Genki Sushi Tiu Keng Leng Branch

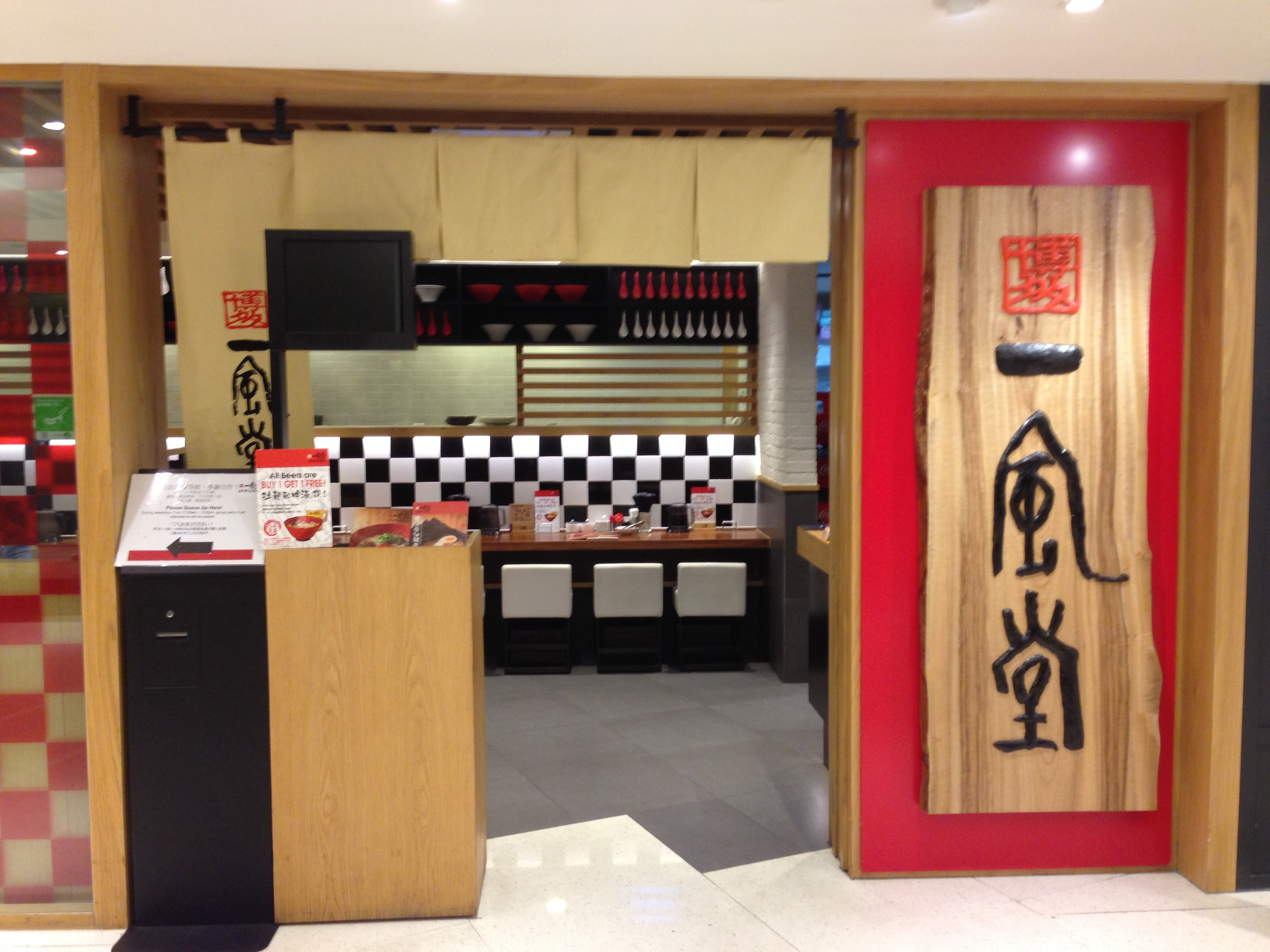
Ippudo Admiralty Branch

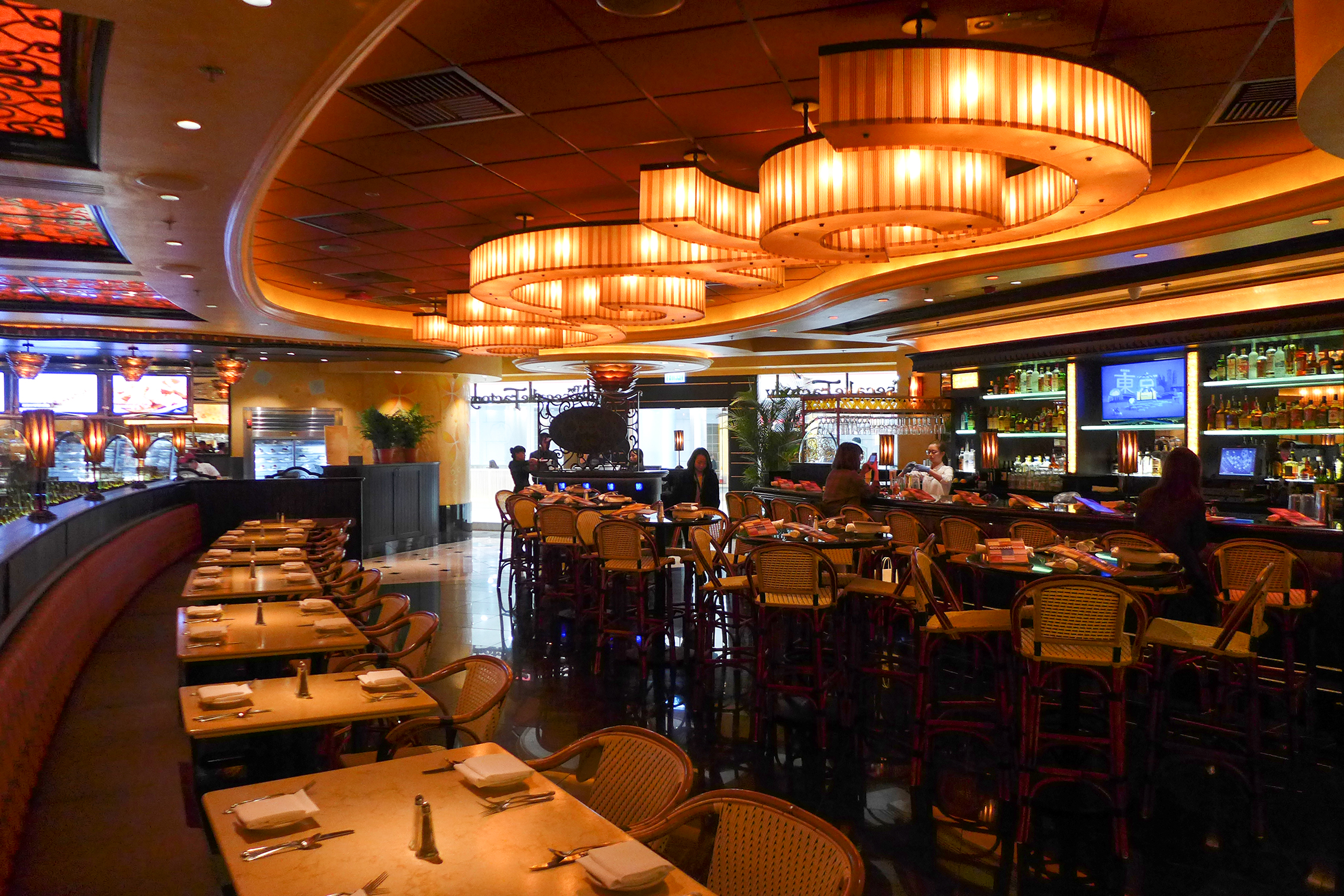
The Cheesecake Factory Gateway Arcade Tsim Sha Tsui Branch

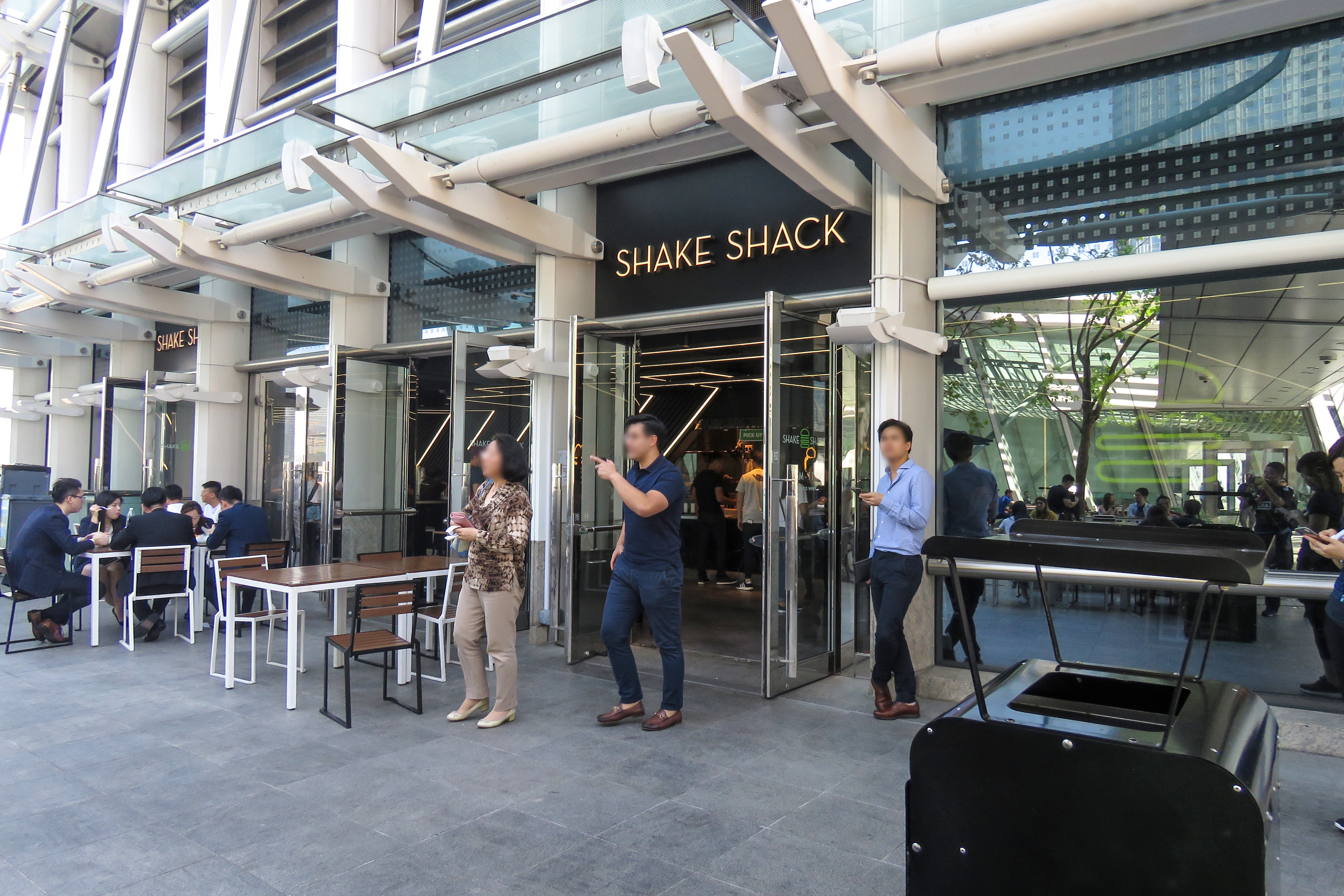
Shake Shack IFC Mall Central Branch

== Brands ==
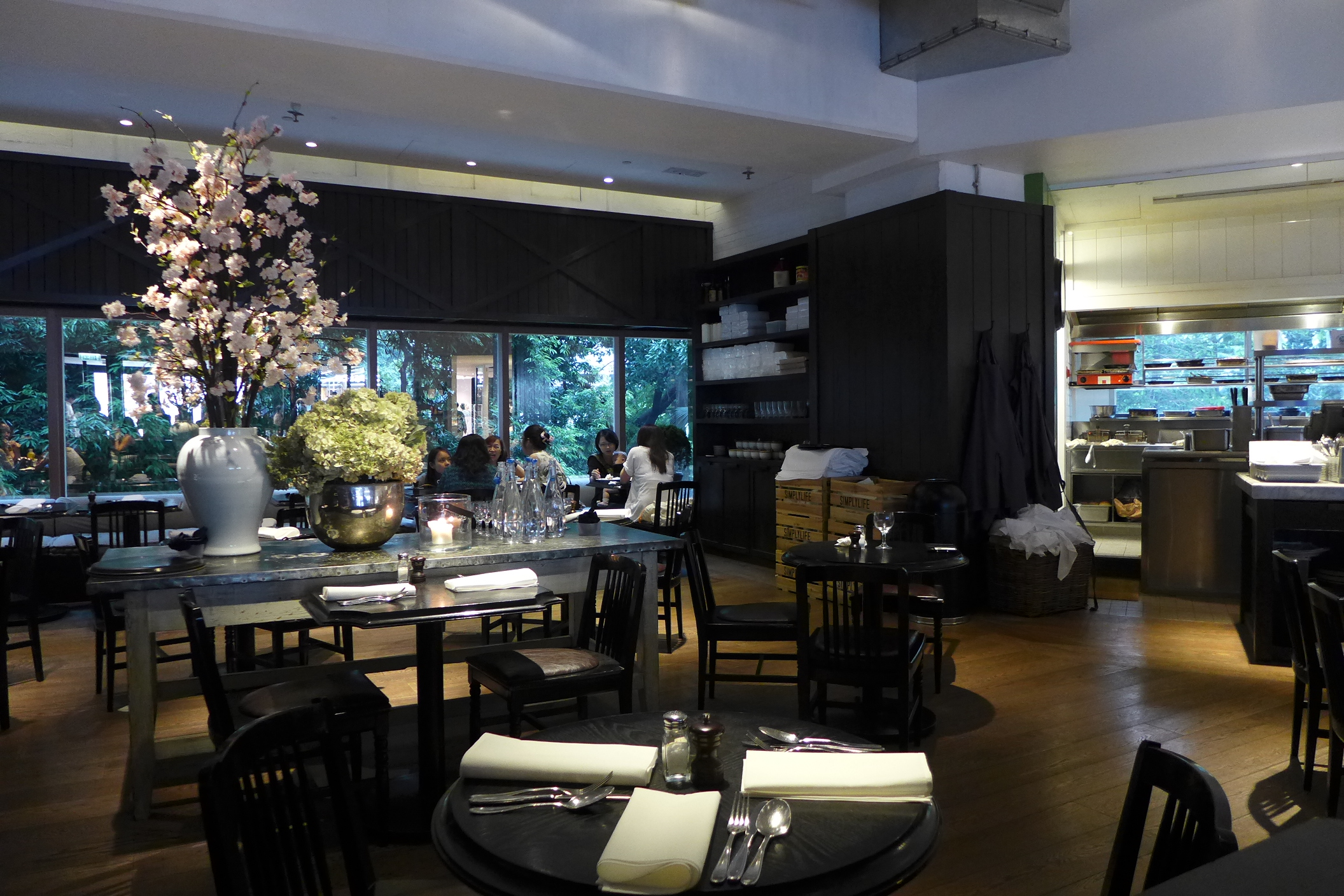
Simplylife Bakery Cafe in Queensway Plaza, Admiralty

In 1998, Maxim's launched a restaurant series named m.a.x. concepts, which managed restaurant brands including MAX, Cellini, Mecca, Thai Basil, eating plus, Mezz, café Landmark, Emporio Armani Caffé, and modern restaurants Kiku and Miso.

In 2004 the company opened the French-Vietnamese restaurant chain Rice Paper. In the same year, Maxim's Fast Food began producing ready meals and appetisers to be sold in 7–11 and Wellcome supermarkets.

Maxim's bought Genki Sushi in early 2006, and the company introduced the American restaurant chain Lawry's The Prime Rib to Hong Kong the same year. Maxim's and Australian chef Geoff Lindsay opened the restaurant "Pearl on the Peak" in the Peak Tower. The company is the licensee of Ippudo ramen, Shake Shack and The Cheesecake Factory in various territories.

In May 2000, Maxim's partnered with Starbucks Coffee International, Inc. to form Coffee Concepts Ltd., holding licences for both Hong Kong and Macau.

In 2005, Maxim's rebranded most of its restaurants as MX.

== Controversies ==
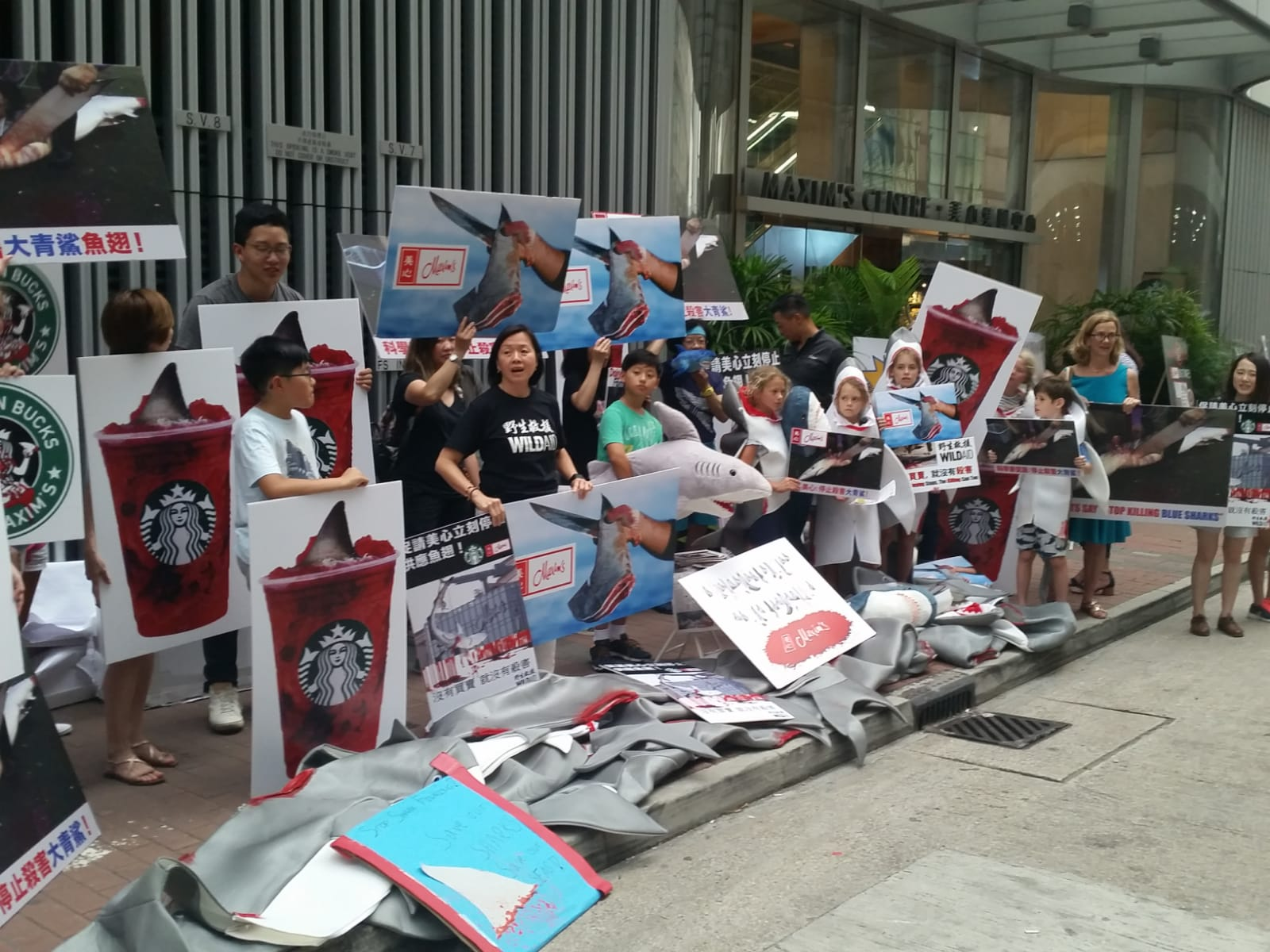
Shark fin protestors at Maxim's HQ, Hong Kong in 2018

=== Shark fin controversy ===
Maxim's have been targeted by campaigners regarding the company's support of shark finning. On 10 June 2017 dozens protested at their flagship 'Maxim's Palace' restaurant for selling threatened and endangered shark species. 50 protestors attended a demonstration at Maxim's branch at The University of Hong Kong on 10 February 2018. On 15 June 2018 protestors directly targeted Maxim's headquarters in a demonstration that also targeted Starbucks' regional licensee being Maxims. Maxim subsequently announced that it would stop serving shark fin in all restaurants from 1 January 2020.

=== 2019–2020 boycott campaign ===
Maxim's outlets have been the target of boycotts and vandalism during the 2019–2020 Hong Kong protests after Annie Wu, the daughter of Maxim's co-founder James Wu, denounced the protests movement and Hong Kong youth. Wu holds only 0.33 per cent of the shares of Hong Kong Caterers Ltd, which owns 50 per cent of Maxim's Caterers Ltd, and has no managerial responsibilities in the company. However, as revealed by David Webb, she received HK$1.3 million in dividend payouts for the 2018 fiscal year.

=== 2021–2022 animal cruelty campaign ===
Maxim's Group has been targeted by a campaign claiming they use animal cruelty in their supply chain across Asia. This campaign claims Maxim's Group uses eggs from battery cages that are banned by the European Union Council Directive 1999/74/EC. The target restaurant chains for this campaign have been so far Genki Sushi and Arome Bakery.
