= Wu Shun Tak =

Chinese industrialist and entrepreneur (1912-2003)

Wu Shun Tak (Chinese: 伍舜德; 1912 – August 17, 2003) was a Chinese industrialist and entrepreneur best known as the co-founder of Maxim's Caterers, one of the largest food and beverage companies in Hong Kong. Born in Changlong Village, Tangxia, Sijiu Town, Taishan County, Guangdong Province, China, he moved to Hong Kong where he and his younger brother James Wu founded the company in 1956.

Under his leadership, Maxim’s expanded from a single Western restaurant into a diversified catering group that includes bakeries, fast food chains, and institutional catering services. In addition to his business achievements, Wu supported educational causes, including donations to Tsinghua University and the founding of a school in his hometown of Taishan.

== Biography ==
Wu Shun Tak graduated from the Department of Economics at Lingnan University Business School in 1935. In 1956, he co-founded Hong Kong Maxim’s Caterers Limited with his brother James Wu. Wu Shun Tak served as Honorary Chairman of the Lingnan (University) College of Sun Yat-sen University, General Manager of Luk Hoi Tong Company Limited in Hong Kong, and was the founder of Xueye Junior High School in Taishan. He also held honorary professorships at the Lingnan (University) College of Sun Yat-sen University and Wuyi University, as well as advisory professorship at Tsinghua University. He was a renowned industrialist.

Wu married Ma Lanfang in 1936, and their marriage lasted until both died in 2003. They had five children.

== Memorials ==
- Wu Shun Tak Library: This library is the branch of Sun Yat-sen University Library dedicated to economics and management, located on the South Campus of Sun Yat-sen University in Guangzhou.
- Shun Tak Building: Located at Tsinghua University, it currently houses the Department of Industrial Engineering.
- Wu Shun Tak Building: Located at Tsinghua University, it currently houses the School of Public Policy and Management.
