= Annie Wu (businesswoman) =

Hong Kong businesswoman

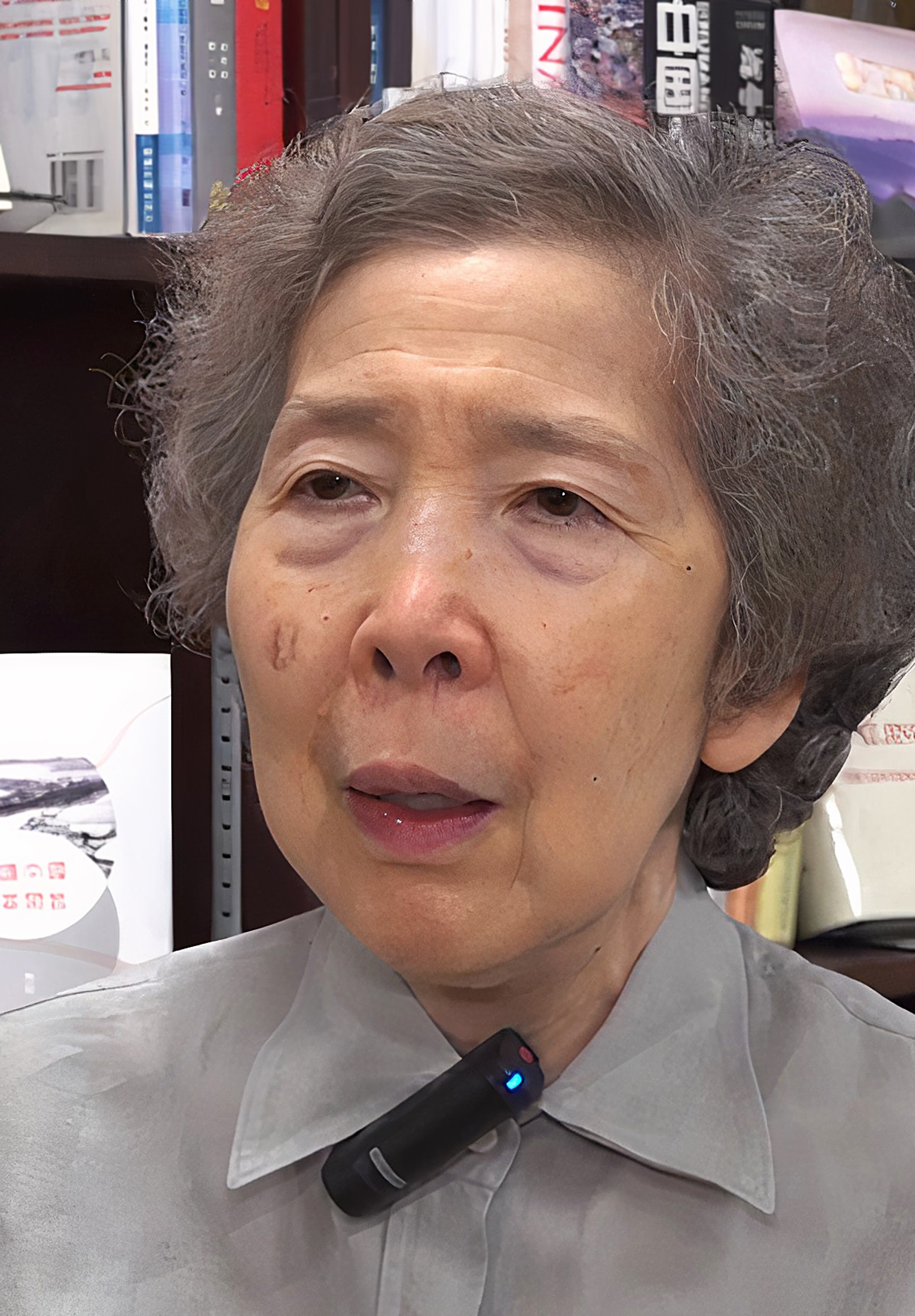
Wu in 2019

Annie Wu Suk-ching, SBS, JP (Chinese: 伍淑清; pinyin: Wǔ Shūqīng; born 13 September 1948) is a Hong Kong businesswoman of Taishan, Guangdong origin. She is the eldest daughter of Dr James Tak Wu, founder of Maxim's Catering, and is a member of the Standing Committee of the Chinese People's Political Consultative Conference.

== Early life and career ==
Wu was born and grew up in Hong Kong, and studied at Sacred Heart Canossian College and then (1968–70) at Armstrong College in Berkeley in the United States.

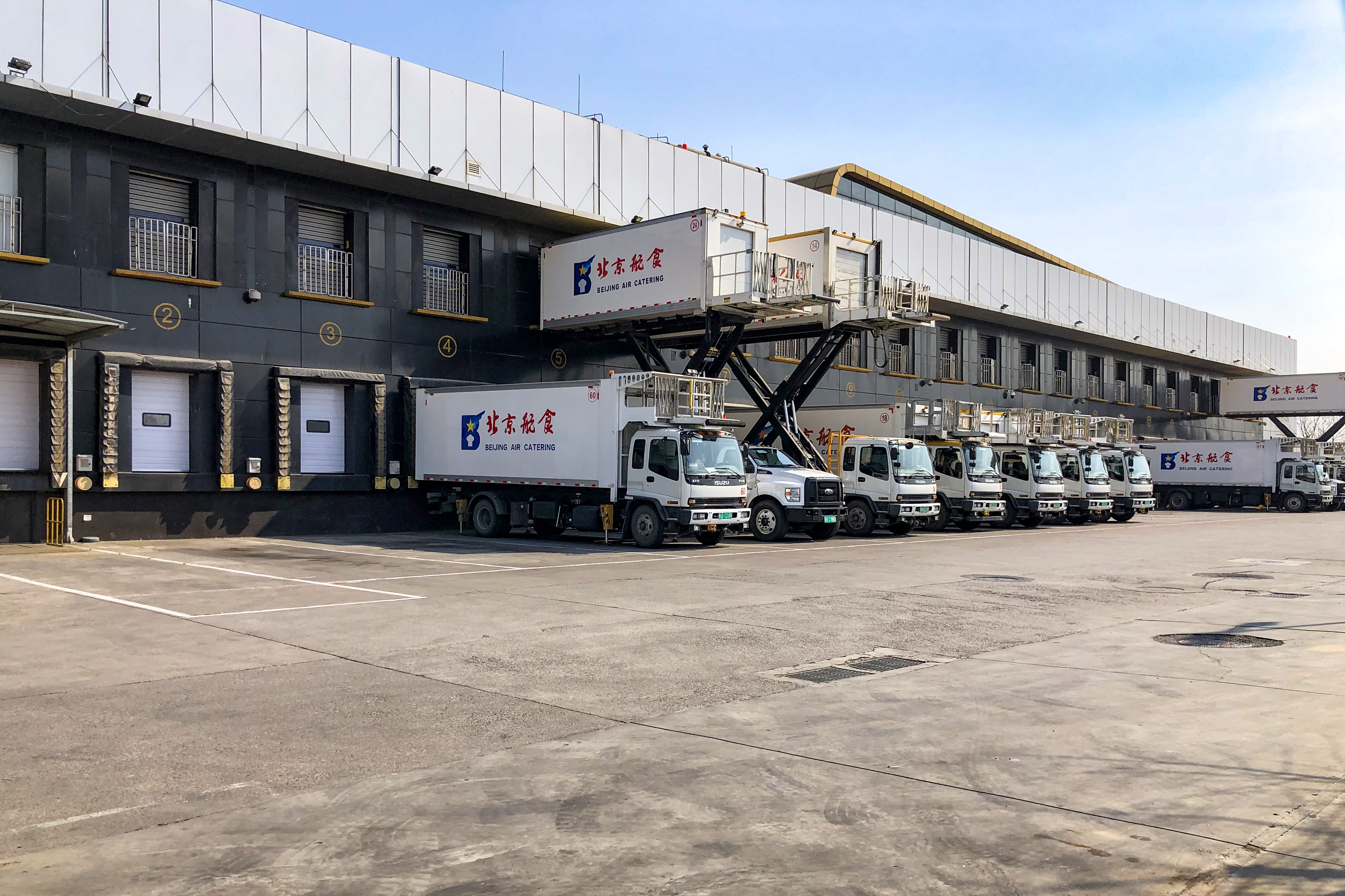
Wu started Beijing Air Catering, the first joint venture company in mainland China since 1954, on 1 May 1980

Wu is honorary president of Beijing Air Catering Ltd, the first sino-foreign joint-venture company to be set up in the People's Republic of China. She is the managing director of private firm Hong Kong Beijing Air Catering Ltd.

== Opposition to 2019–20 Hong Kong protests ==
In September 2019, Wu attracted attention when she criticised the Hong Kong anti-extradition bill protests. She drew praise from Chinese newspaper People's Daily shortly after competitor (in mooncake sales) Garic Kwok had been criticised for supporting the protests, harming sales of his family's Taipan Bread & Cakes brand.

Later the same month, as supervisory consultant of the Hong Kong Federation of Women, Wu denounced the pro-democratic movement during an appearance at the United Nations Human Rights Council. She has also repeatedly denounced Hong Kong youth, stating that Hong Kong should "give up" on two generations of "lost" youngsters, and claimed that she would "not waste [her] time talking to them, as they have no idea what they are doing". She criticised young Hong Kongers for their alleged anti-China sentiment, which she blamed on a lack of Chinese history education starting from the kindergarten level. Wu called on the Chinese Foundation Secondary School, which she founded in 2000, to fire faculty and expel students who boycotted classes. Her actions, considered as suppression of freedom of speech, aroused the anger of protesters, and subsequently Maxim outlets became the target of boycotts and vandalism. Wu holds only 0.33 per cent of the shares of Hong Kong Caterers Ltd, which owns 50 per cent of Maxim's Caterers Ltd, and has no managerial responsibilities in the company. However, as revealed by David Webb, she received HK$1.3 million in dividend payouts for the 2018 fiscal year.

== Affiliations ==
As a Hong Kong member of the CPPCC, Wu is an ex-officio member of the 1500-person election committee that is responsible for electing the Chief Executive of Hong Kong.

Wu received the HKSAR's Silver Bauhinia Star in 1999. She was made an Honorary Doctor of Humane Letters Degree by Carleton College in Northfield, Minnesota in 2009.

She is the Honorary Consul of the United Republic of Tanzania in Hong Kong and Macau. She is also the Chairperson of AMTD Group's Global Advisory Committee.

Wu helped establish the Hong Kong Federation of Women, an organisation formed under the direction of Beijing to align pro-China forces.

Wu is Chair of the Chinese History and Culture Educational Foundation For Youth and the Hong Kong Soong Ching Ling Children's Foundation Ltd.
