= Arome Bakery =

Hong Kong-based Japanese-style chain bakery

- Traditional Chinese: 東海堂
- Simplified Chinese: 东海堂
- Literal meaning: Hall of the East China Sea
Transcriptions
Standard Mandarin
- Hanyu Pinyin: Dōnghǎi Táng
Yue: Cantonese
- Yale Romanization: Dūng hói tòhng
- Jyutping: Dung1 hoi2 tong4

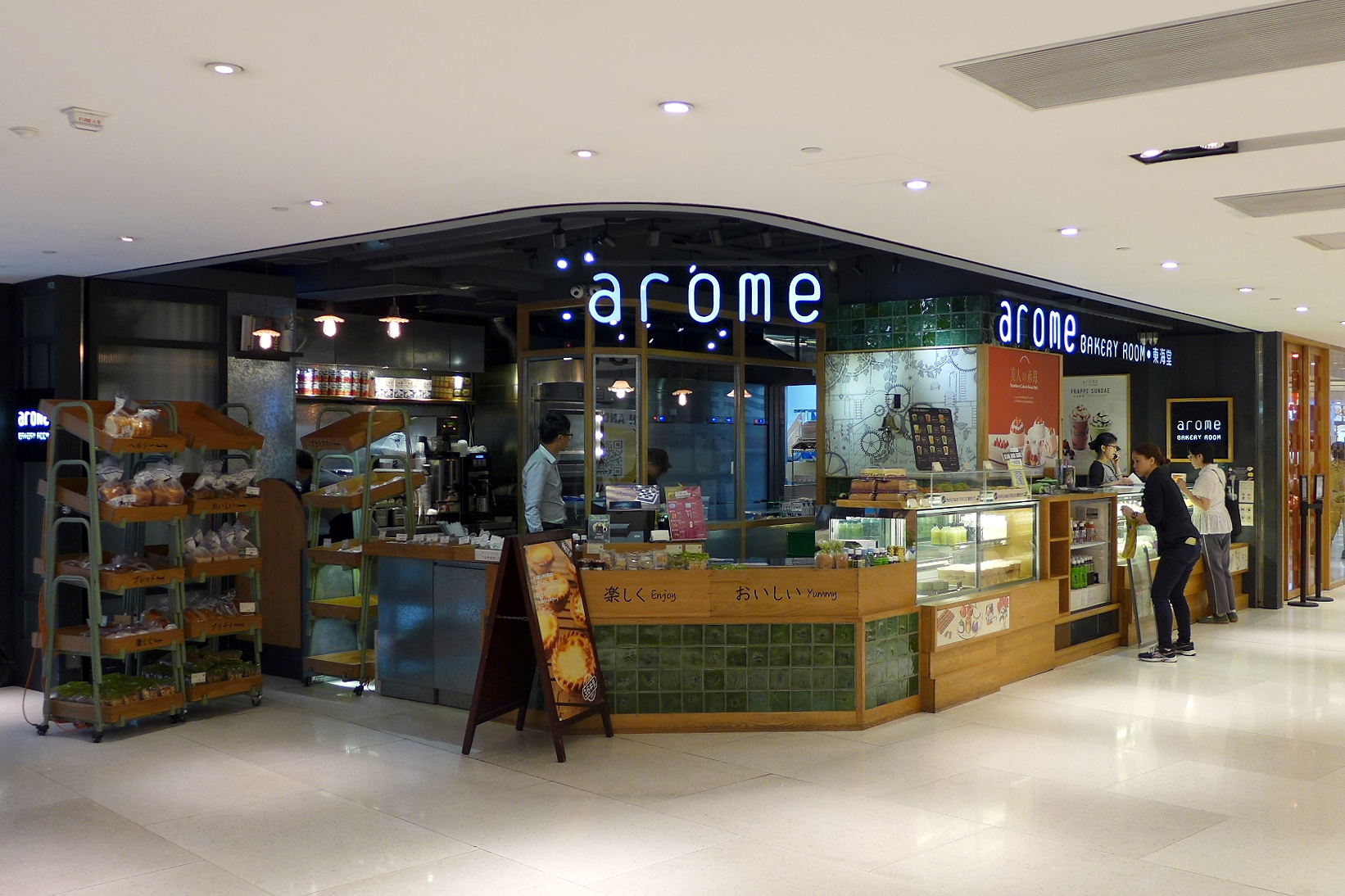
Arome Bakery outlet in Queensway Plaza, Admiralty

Arome Bakery (Chinese: 東海堂) is a Hong Kong–based Japanese-style chain bakery. It operates over 50 shops in Hong Kong. It was founded in 1985 by Ching-Po Yu (于鏡波) and his daughter Man-Ying Yu (于文瑛), who are also the founders of Hong Kong Construction, the Hong Kong branch of Kumagai Gumi. Arome was acquired by Maxim's Catering, which is owned by Dairy Farm International Holdings, in 2008.

== 2022 animal cruelty campaign ==
Arome Bakery has been targeted by a campaign claiming they use animal cruelty in their supply chain across Asia This campaign claims Arome Bakery and all Maxim's Group restaurants use eggs from battery cages that are banned by the European Union Council Directive 1999/74/EC.

== See also ==
- List of bakeries
