= Genki Sushi =

Japanese restaurant chain

Genki Sushi Co., Ltd.
- Traded as: TYO: 9828
- Founded: July 1979; 46 years ago
- Headquarters: Utsunomiya, Tochigi, Japan
- Website: genkisushi.co.jp

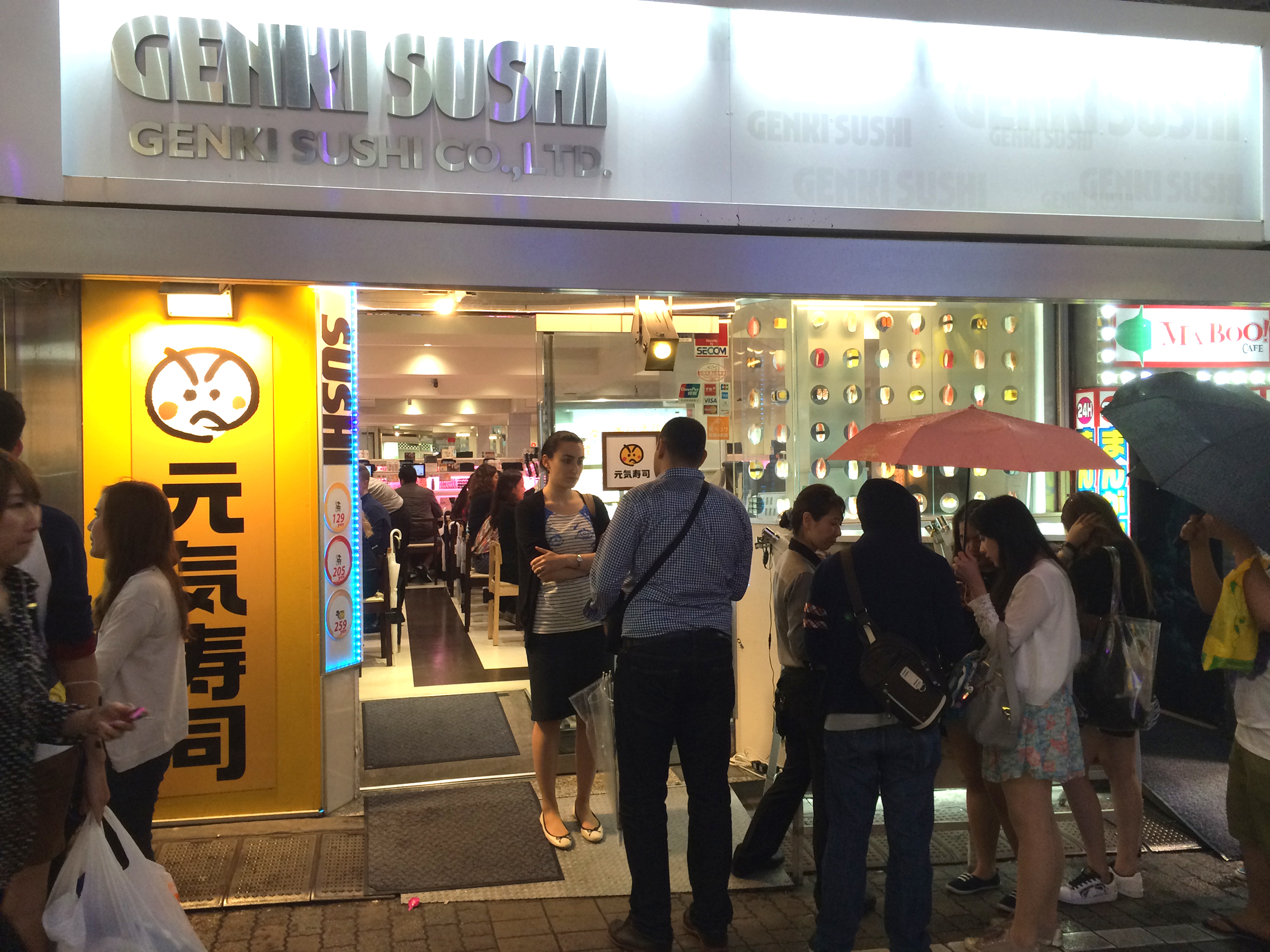
Genki Sushi in Shibuya, Tokyo, Japan

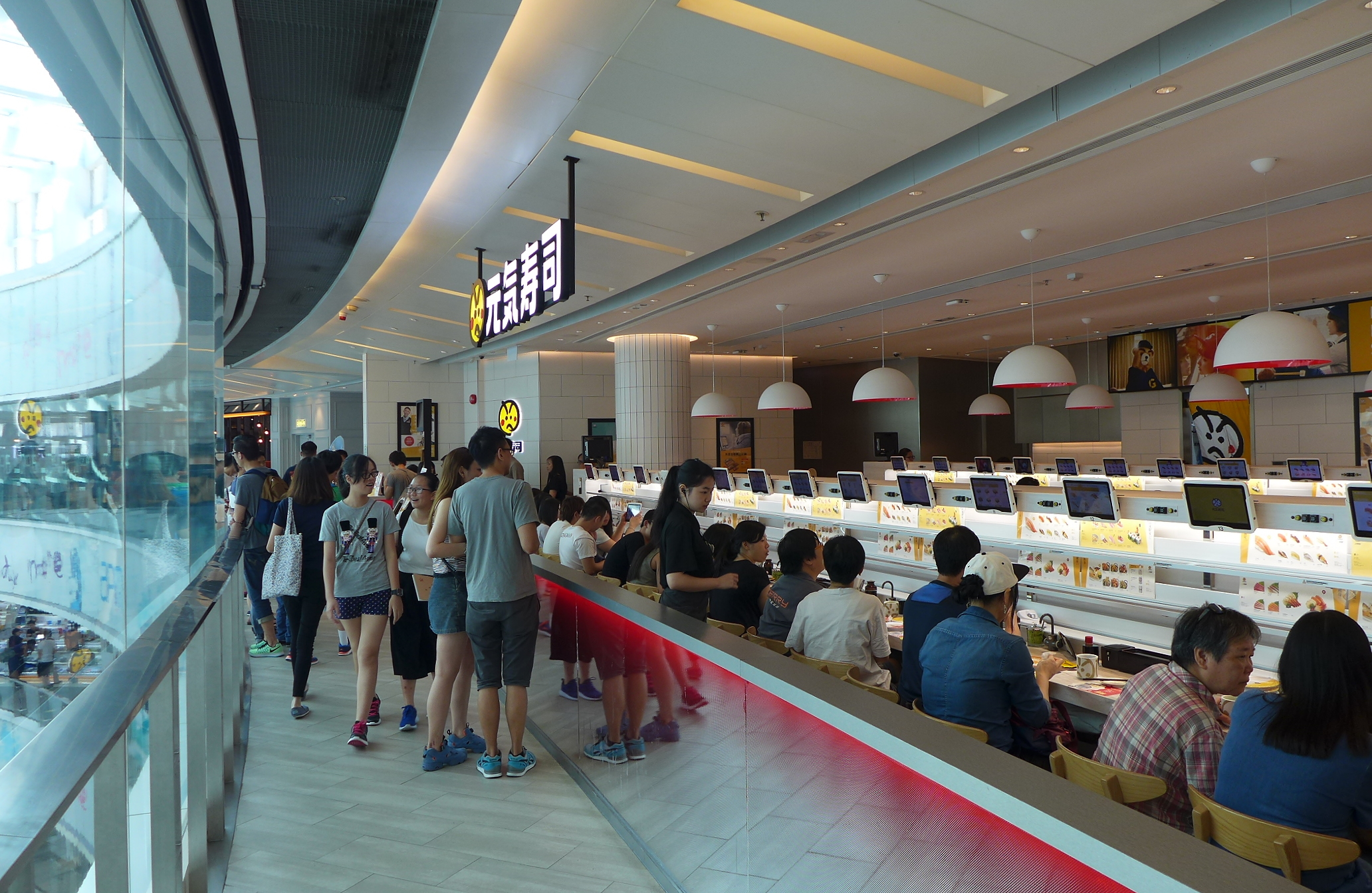
Genki Sushi concept store in Apm, Hong Kong

Genki Sushi is a chain of conveyor belt sushi restaurants established in 1990 in Japan. The chain expanded to include locations in Japan, Hong Kong, Indonesia, Malaysia, Singapore, Kuwait, the Philippines, China, Australia, Cambodia, Myanmar and the American states of California, Hawaii and Washington.

Genki Sushi restaurants in Hong Kong are operated by Maxim's Caterers.

== See also ==
- List of restaurants in Hawaii
- List of sushi restaurants
