= James Wu =

Hong Kong businessman (1922–2020)

James Tak Wu, GBS, (Chinese: 伍沾德; pinyin: Wǔ Zhāndé; 1922 – 29 October 2020) was a Hong Kong businessman who co-founded Maxim's Catering (now a major subsidiary of Dairy Farm International Holdings) and co-founded a chain of restaurants, nightclubs, fast-food outlets, cake and coffee shops, institutional catering units and theaters throughout Hong Kong. As of 2015, Wu remained Honorary Chairman of Maxim's Group under Jardine Matheson's ownership.

== Background ==
With ancestry from Taishan, Guangdong, Wu was born in the United States and educated in Guangdong. Wu graduated from Lingnan University in Guangzhou in 1947. With brother S.T. Wu, Wu established Maxim's Catering in Kowloon, Hong Kong, in 1956 and, by 1967, had a thriving business.

Wu was a member of the Hong Kong Tourism Board in 2002.

== Family ==
He is the father of Annie Wu Suk-ching.

== Honours ==
Wu is Honorary Chairman of the Board of Trustees and Chairman of the Development & Planning Council, whose focus is on nurturing professional management talent for Southern China.

- He holds Honorary Doctorates from the Sun Yat-Sen University in Guangzhou and Springfield College in Springfield, Massachusetts.
- In 2009, he was awarded the Gold Bauhinia Star by the Hong Kong SAR Government.
- He was named "Honorary Citizen of Guangzhou" by the municipal government of his native Guangzhou in 2003.

== Death ==
On 19 November 2020, the Maxim's Group published a post on its website, announcing Wu had died on 29 October 2020 at Hong Kong Sanatorium & Hospital, aged 98.

== Legacy ==
- The Dr and Mrs James Tak Wu Award for Outstanding Service (Lingnan University; established 1998)

Order of precedence
Preceded by Alice Tai; Recipients of the Gold Bauhinia Star	Hong Kong order of precedence Recipients of the Gold Bauhinia Star	Succeeded by Frederick Ma; Recipients of the Gold Bauhinia Star
