= Youth in Hong Kong =

A group of Hong Kong youths

Youth in Hong Kong, according to the University of Hong Kong Statistical Profile, comprises citizens of the Chinese territory of Hong Kong aged 15–24 years. As of 2011, youth in Hong Kong ages 15–24 made up 12.4 per cent of Hong Kong's overall population at 875,200 people. Hong Kong is a hybrid culture, influenced by China and Britain, but overall by its international economic ties which plays a role in shaping the lives of the youth in Hong Kong. The youth in Hong Kong is unique in the fact that many are living Transnationalist identities. The demographics are not just ethnically Chinese youth in Hong Kong, but also youth that are ethnically white, Indonesian, Filipino, which can be seen in Demographics of Hong Kong, and that creates a unique society. "Although with a dominant Chinese population, Hong Kong is an international city and is a mix of East and West rich in cultures, history, and religions." The disparity between the rich and poor within Hong Kong has been growing wider.

The population consists of slightly more female youth than there are males, with the ratio being 858 males per every 1,000 females in 2014. The population of youth in Hong Kong is expected to decrease by 8 per cent in the next couple years. Hong Kong consists of 18 districts, and the youth are not evenly spread throughout these districts. Roughly 56.3 per cent of Hong Kong youth live in the New Territories. The most common cause of death for Hong Kong youth aged 15–24 is "external causes of morbidity and mortality," and within this category the highest percentage died under the cause of "intentional self harm."

Hong Kong youths' social world is greatly influenced by family and peer relationships which shape functioning, support, social self-concept, and social isolation. The youth scene in Hong Kong includes risk-taking behaviour such as party going, sex, drug abuse, fighting, and high-speed driving. An important aspect of Hong Kong is its transnational education. Having paid work and a stable job allows young people to become independent from their parents, participate in adult forms of leisure, and gives them adult status in society. However, given the city's salient influence by globalisation, neoliberal values, mainland China and its postcolonial condition, the youth are generally characterised by a fluid and ambivalent cultural and social identity that affects how they frame and mediate future opportunities.

Political protests led by Hong Kong youth have become more prevalent in recent years, due to concerns for public and developmental affairs in Hong Kong. The most common reasons to why Hong Kong youth go on the internet and engage in mass media were for entertainment, searching for information, and connecting with friends.

== Family and peer influence ==
In 2006 and 2011, the proportion of youth living with parent(s) only was in a rising trend between 2001 and 2011 and had risen from 91.5 per cent in 2001 to 94.6 per cent in 2011. Youth who have parents who have higher educational attainment are more likely to have higher educational attainment themselves. Hong Kong youths' social world is greatly influenced by family and peer relationships which shape functioning, support, social self-concept, and social isolation.

Between 1996 and 2011, the percentage of never-married females aged 20–24 had risen from 90.1 per cent to 97.3 per cent while the percentage for males had increased steadily from 94.5 per cent to 98.7 per cent in 2011. According to 87.2 per cent of youth surveyed, marriage was still an important institution. As to the fertility rate, the age-specific fertility rate per 1,000 females aged 20–24 had rebounded since 2008.

== Health ==
For non-engaged youth in Hong Kong, there are higher risks for experiencing poor mental health and becoming involved in criminal activity than their peers who are engaged. With better family support and strong positive peer relationships there is a lower chance for Hong Kong youth to be depressed or suicidal. The suicide rate in Hong Kong has risen from 35 percent from 1999 to 2003, and has since still been on the rise. Suicide has become the leading cause of death in Hong Kongers aged 15 to 24. For Hong Kong youth who have low social support from their parents and peers, they often feel hopeless and have lower self-worth, increasing the risk for suicide. As the contagion spreads, combined with perceived hopelessness over their future, loneliness and lethargy often drive young people from interacting with others in the real world to retreat behind the shield of a computer screen. A lack of societal understanding and resources for mental illnesses also plays a role in the increasing number of non-engaged youths in Hong Kong.

In Hong Kong there is a stigma against homosexuals that is far greater than their counterparts in the West, even from college students who are typically the most tolerant of subgroups.

The youth scene in Hong Kong includes risk-taking behaviour such as party going, sex, drug abuse, fighting, high-speed driving. Attending dance parties, such as raves or discos, seems to expose Hong Kong youth to drugs and other risky behaviour due to peer influence. With the availability of illicit drugs at a low price, more youth are inclined to risk-taking.

Based on the study by the Family Planning Association of Hong Kong, the proportion of males aged 18–27 who had sexual intercourse experience had risen from 36.7 per cent in 1991 to 50.0 per cent in 2011, while the proportion of females aged 18–27 also had risen from 32.7 per cent in 1991 to 42.0 per cent in 2011. Sexual intercourse is far less common in Hong Kong youth than in North American youth. In 2011, the number of males aged 16–20 arrested per 100,000 respective populations was 1,665.2 while that for females was 318.6. Most males were arrested for burglary, fighting, possession of narcotics, and violent crimes, while most females were arrested for burglary and possession of drugs.

== Education ==
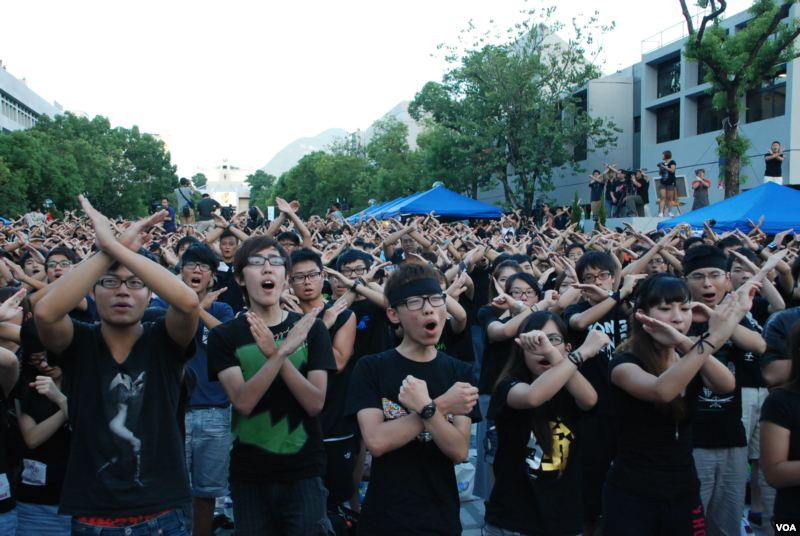
Hong Kong students boycott classes, in protest of national education, at the Chinese University of Hong Kong

As of 2011, 64.8 per cent of Hong Kong youth attended education full-time, with the percentage of youth attending post-secondary schooling on the rise.

An important aspect of Hong Kong is its transnational education. It is an education "in which the learners are located in a country different from the one where the awarding institution is based." This is true for Hong Kong youth who attend local institutions where foreign courses are offered that are considered British, Australian, American. Students can then, through an application, get credit from the institution the courses are offered from even though they took the courses at their home institutions. Hong Kong does not directly regulate the quality of the transnational education offered, nor does it shape the content or cost of courses being offered by foreign providers. Being an internationalised territory, students at both the university level and in post-secondary vocational training in Hong Kong receive an education that is often geared towards international knowledge, rather than just local knowledge and practice. Hong Kong youth, therefore, obtain skills and knowledge that make them marketable for jobs worldwide. Most youth who leave school say they do so to find a good job with a good income. They soon realise their opportunities are limited without at least a senior secondary education level and work-related experience.

According to the World Bank, the rate of primary education completion from 2010 to 2016 in Hong Kong was 96 per cent. The rate of secondary education completion was 93.4 per cent, and the rate of tertiary education completion was 67 per cent.

== Labour and employment ==
With the decreasing youth population and increasing participation in full-time education within Hong Kong, the labour force of youth aged 15–24 has continued to shrink since 1997. Having paid work and a stable job allows young people to become independent from their parents, participate in adult forms of leisure and gives them adult status in society.

In relation to future educational and career opportunities, Hong Kong youth exhibit a disposition of aspirational ambivalence. For instance, in Hong Kong, there are many "non-engaged" youth. "Non-engaged" youth describes young people in Hong Kong who do not participate in education, employment, or training. The change in the working environment is another reason behind the rise in its number. Hong Kong has been considered an international and prosperous city for a long time and is one of the wealthiest societies in the world in terms of per capita GDP. Since the general public of Hong Kong recently does not receive much of this economic growth, the past 30 so years has seen far more unemployment and under-employed people living in poverty. This high unemployment has greatly affected youth in Hong Kong who have seen unemployment rates hovering between 10 and 15 per cent in recent years; The economy has shifted from a labor-intensive model to a model that favors “professional and highly skilled workers.” There are very few job opportunities for young workers with no skills or work experience. Nowadays, many jobs in Hong Kong require an undergraduate qualification or a particular professional skill set, such as lawyer, plumber, and steel bender. Youth face fierce competition from imported workers and new immigrants for labor-intensive employment. Compared with local youths, these workers are often willing to work for lower wages and adapt to harsh environments. Such a market makes it difficult for youngsters to find a job.

The government estimated there were about 200,000 young people who were not receiving training, education, or actively participating in the labour force. The Hong Kong government has therefore been implementing pre-employment training to youth, known as the Youth Pre-employment Training Program (YPTP), and educational opportunities in order for them to learn how to market themselves in order to obtain jobs. Youth without at least a senior secondary education level usually enter the labour market with part-time low-skilled jobs, but even that does not necessarily protect them from exploitative practices from their employers such as low wages. While the government uses programs like the YPTP to try to raise aspirations for non-engaged youth in Hong Kong, this does not guarantee future employment. Furthermore, despite the increased economic integration of Hong Kong with mainland China and increased job opportunities available in the mainland, the youth's attitudes toward pursuing transborder opportunities have generally negative.

== Youth activism ==
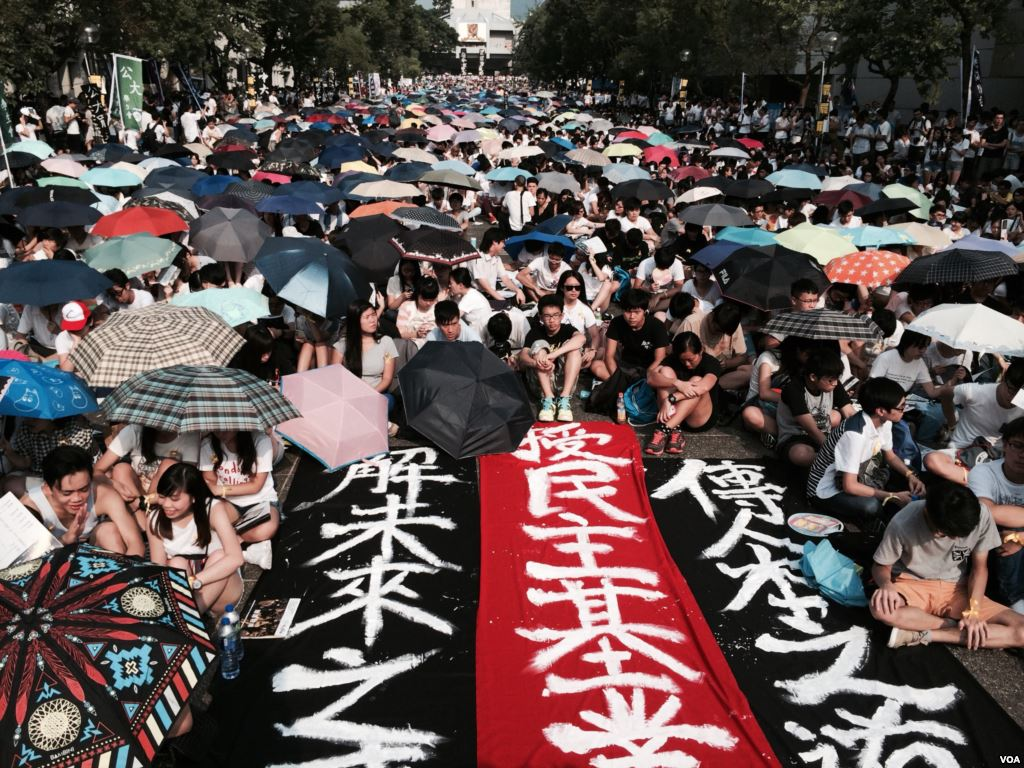
Students participating in the Umbrella Revolution

Hong Kong went through retrocession to China in 1997, but Hong Kong does have democratic aspirations. Human rights and democracy have emerged quickly in Hong Kong, triggered by the political transition toward the handover of sovereignty, and was accelerated by the 1989 Tiananmen Square protests and massacre. Hong Kong people have participated in large-scale protests many times to express themselves in the past couple of decades. Political protests led by Hong Kong youth have become more prevalent in recent years, where these young activists have expressed concern for public and developmental affairs in Hong Kong.

Many Hong Kong youth participate in Hong Kong's pro-democracy movement, and the 2014 Hong Kong protests were led by two student groups: Scholarism and the Hong Kong Federation of Students. In the 2014 Hong Kong protests students rallied outside Hong Kong's government headquarters calling for political reforms to open up nominations for the city's inaugural direct election in 2017. Hong Kong's youth believe their future would be brighter with democracy, since Hong Kong's wealth is concentrated in the hands of a few wealthy citizens, big business greatly influences government policy, there are high property prices, and wages are stagnant.

Young activists also use 'e-mobilisation' to mobilise protesters and scrutinise social issues by creating social media platforms on Facebook, Twitter, and other social media sites.

Seventy-one percent of Hong Kong students reported that they had learned how important voting was in school although they are not taught much about democratic elections. Seventy-two percent of Hong Kong students reported that it was important to follow political news in the media.

== Media ==
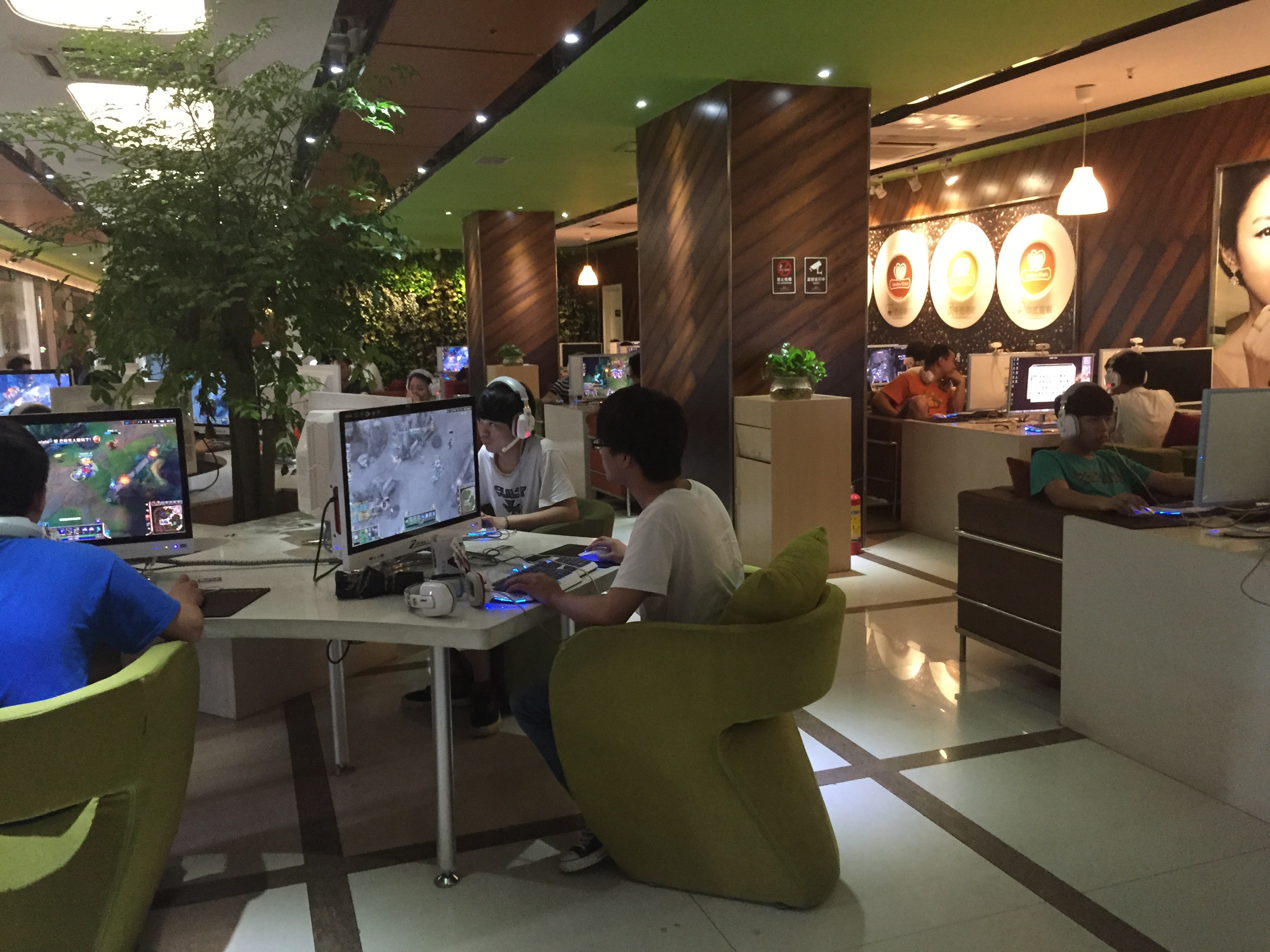
Youth in Hong Kong at an internet cafe playing online games

Hong Kong is considered to be one of the most sophisticated and successful telecommunications markets in the world, with a household broadband penetration rate of 77.8 per cent, and that does not include Hong Kongers with dial-up internet access. There are also a huge number of mobile subscribers in Hong Kong, as well as a high level of media saturation. Mass media is found everywhere in Hong Kong. As seen in many other places globally, mass media can harmfully affect young people. In Hong Kong, mass media can influence the formation of different types of behaviours and values such as sexual and deviant behaviour. Factors indicating differences in time spent with and interacting with mass media include gender and family background. Female youth spend more time on television and blogging while male youth spend more time on the internet. Youth who consider their families in a "difficult" economic status spend considerably more time online than their counterparts from the middle class and rich.

Some negative aspects that come out of Hong Kong youth's social media access is cyber bullying, participating in "compensated dating" and copyright infringement. The most common reasons to why Hong Kong youth go on the internet were for entertainment, searching for information, and connecting with friends. Roughly 29.4 per cent of Hong Kong youth have contributed to Wikipedia in their lifetime.

Many Hong Kong youth also use social media in order to communicate with each other during social movements and to gain information about social movements. One news reporter stated, that during the Umbrella Revolution, "the predominantly young demonstrators of Hong Kong... also thought of ways to disseminate information with their mobiles should the authorities decide to cut internet reception to these devices." During the Umbrella Revolution Hong Kong youth-created Facebook pages, and used WhatsApp to send out information to the masses.

== See also ==
- Post-80s
- 2019–20 Hong Kong protests
