= Directive 1999/74/EC =

EU chicken welfare legislation

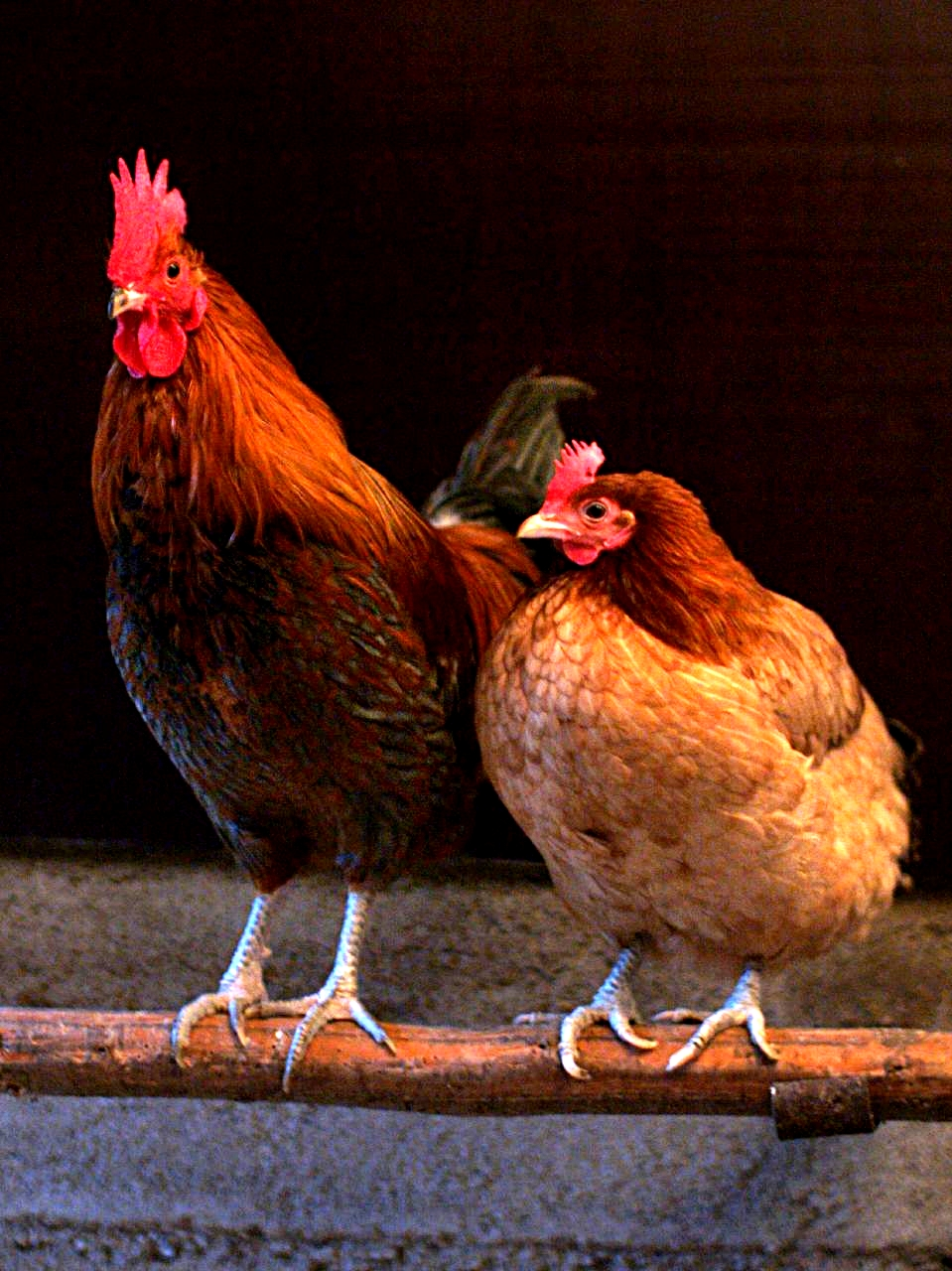
a pair of chickens

Directive 1999/74/EC is legislation passed by the European Union on the minimum standards for keeping egg laying hens which effectively bans conventional battery cages. The directive, passed in 1999, banned conventional battery cages in the EU from 1 January 2012 after a 13-year phase-out. Battery cages were already banned in Germany, Austria, the Netherlands and Sweden prior to 2012. The directive does not apply to establishments with fewer than 350 laying hens or establishments rearing breeding laying hens. Such establishments are, however, subject to the requirements of Directive 98/58/EC. The directive is not supported with fines, penalties or export bans.

As alternatives to battery cages, Directive 1999/74/EC allows non-cage systems and furnished cages. Furnished cages therefore represent a feasible alternative to battery cages in the EU after 2012. Under the directive, furnished cages must provide at least the following: 750 cm^{2} (120 sq. in.) per hen, of which 600 cm^{2} (90 sq. in.) is 45 cm (18 inches) high, a nest, a littered area for scratching and pecking, 15 cm (6 inches) of perch and 12 cm (5 inches) of food trough per hen and a claw shortening device. Austria banned battery cages in 2009 and ban furnished cages in 2020. Belgium has also banned the battery cage. Germany has introduced a "family cage", which has more space than the furnished cages used in other countries, however, consumers in Germany have been rejecting these eggs. Outside the EU, Switzerland has already banned both the battery and furnished cage systems.

In February 2010, the Polish government formally requested the EU to delay enacting Directive 1999/74/EC by 5 years until 2017, however, this was unsuccessful.

According to figures submitted to the European Commission in 2011, 14 countries were expected to be battery cage free by 1 January 2012. However, six states including Portugal, Poland and Romania admitted they would not be ready, while Spain and Italy, among others, did not know or would not say whether they will meet the deadline. In France one third of egg producers have gone out of business and according to figures of the UGPVB (the industry association) 5% of producers were still not compliant as of January 2012 and have had their licences withdrawn. This has led to fears that cheaper, illegal eggs, particularly liquid egg products, from non-compliant states will flood the market undercutting compliant egg producers. John Dalli, the EU health commissioner, has issued legal warnings to 13 countries over their lack of readiness or effort to enforce the ban. The 13 member states already found to be in breach of the directive are: Hungary, Italy, Latvia, Spain, Greece, Belgium, Bulgaria, Cyprus, Poland, Portugal, Romania, Slovakia and the Netherlands.

== Compliance beyond January 2012 ==
It is clear that beyond the date of the law coming into effect, many hens are still being housed in battery cages. European Commission figures show that more than 47 million hens are still (January 2012) in conventional battery cages across the EU, representing 14.3% of production, although it has been reported this figure might be as high as 23% of EU egg production – equivalent to 84 million hens laying 70 million eggs a day.

15 EU states reported to the EU's Standing Committee on the Food Chain and Animal Health that they had non-compliant producers. These states were Belgium, Bulgaria, Cyprus, France, Greece, Hungary, Italy, UK, Latvia, Malta, Netherlands, Poland, Portugal, Spain and Romania. Some of these countries, such as Italy and Belgium, admit to having 30% of illegal production.

In the UK, there are approximately 31 million egg laying hens. Over £400 million has been spent to meet the standards. In January 2012, reports stated that figures from the Department of Environment, Food and Rural Affairs (DEFRA) indicate 423,000 hens on 32 farms in the UK were still being housed in battery cages. This represents a non-compliance rate of 1%.

== Revision and future phase-out ==
The European Citizens' Initiative (ECI) "End the Cage Age" collected 1.4 million signatures from supporters across the European Union. In June 2021, the European Commission announced plans to propose legislation to phase out and ultimately prohibit cage systems for the animals covered by the initiative, including laying hens.

In its Vision for Agriculture and Food, adopted in February 2025, the Commission stated its intention to revise EU animal-welfare legislation, including a commitment to phase out cages. It also said it would pursue stronger alignment of animal-welfare standards for imported animals and food with those applied in the EU. A call for evidence on the proposed revision ran from June to July 2025, followed by a public consultation from September to December that received more than 190,000 contributions.

On 7 July 2026, the Commission adopted the EU Strategy on Livestock, which announced its intention to propose by the end of 2026 a targeted revision of animal-welfare rules for laying hens and broilers. The proposed revision is to focus on phasing out cages, practical on-farm welfare indicators, ending the systematic killing of male chicks, and introducing equivalent import requirements that comply with World Trade Organization rules.
