= Maxim's MX =

Fast food restaurant chain based in Hong Kong

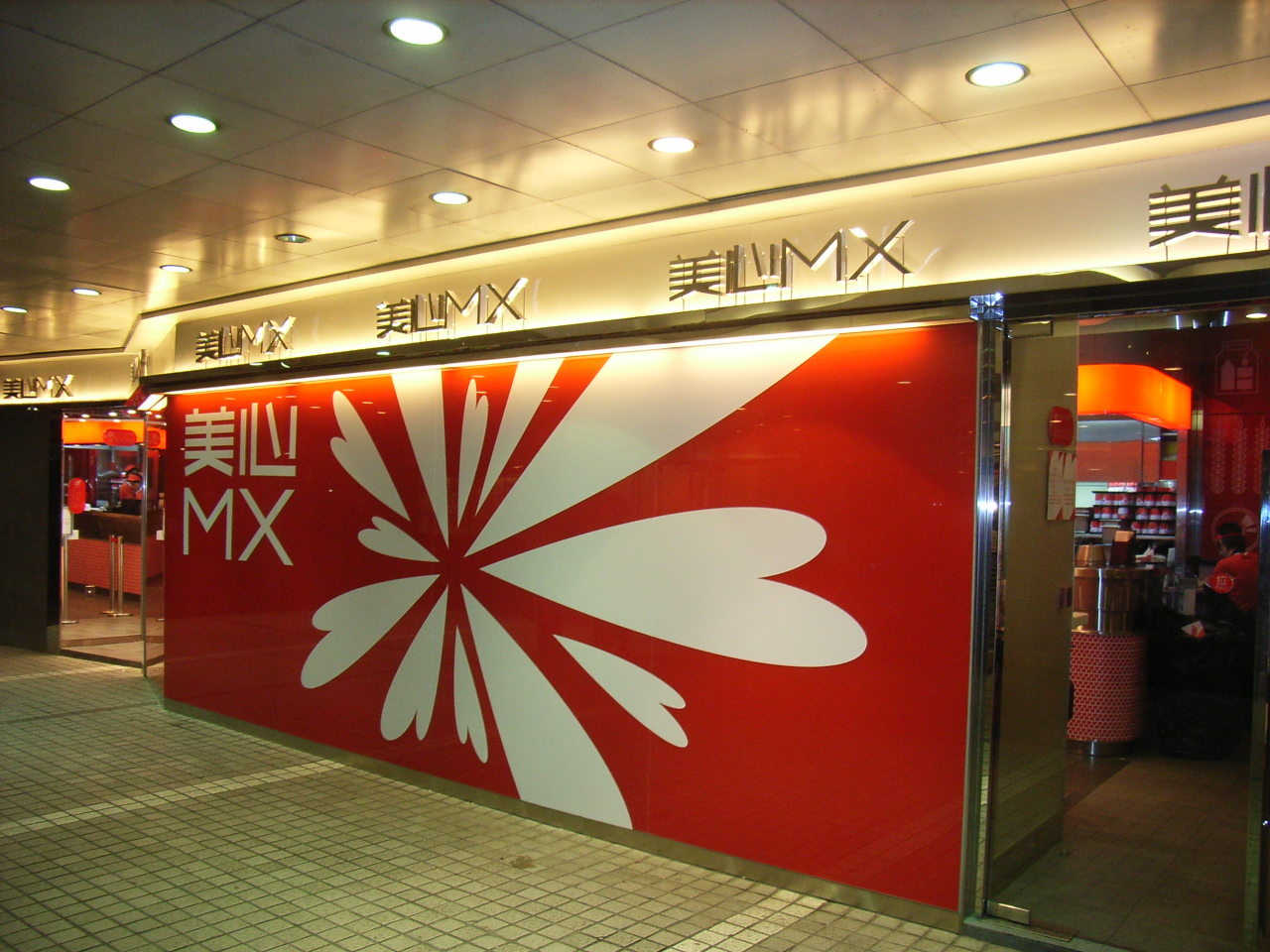
Maxim's MX

Maxim's MX is a Hong Kong chain of Hong Kong-style fast-food restaurants and serves as the flagship fast-food brand of Maxim’s Caterers Limited. Before its rebranding, it operated under the name "Maxim’s Fast Food" for its local fast-food business. Its sub-brands include Sen-ryo Express, Maxim's food², Can．teen and Deli-O. These sub-brands are managed by M.a.x. concepts. Its main competitors in the market are Fairwood and Café de Coral.

Maxim’s fast-food division and institutional catering division are managed under the same administration. The institutional catering division primarily provides meal services for businesses, universities, hospitals, and theme parks.

== History ==
In 1972, the first Maxim’s Fast Food outlet was established on Queen’s Road Central. In addition to serving tea snacks and Western cuisine, it offered lunchboxes for takeaway at noon, and the shop also sold "Maxim’s Hot Dogs" and "Maxim’s Hamburgers" at the counter. That same year, McDonald’s began operating in Hong Kong. The founders of Maxim’s, brothers Wu Shun Tak and James Wu , believed that Chinese fast food would be more popular than Western options. For example, instead of offering Western-style fried chicken legs, Maxim’s could serve Chinese-style marinated chicken legs. With this in mind, they decided to open a Chinese fast-food restaurant.

Before Maxim’s made a major push into the fast-food industry in the 1980s, it had only opened trial outlets in high-traffic areas such as Hong Kong Island, Tsim Sha Tsui, and Oi Man Estate in Ho Man Tin. After observing a favorable market response, the company gradually expanded into other newly developed towns and districts. In 1983, taking advantage of the completion and occupancy of Luk Yeung Sun Chuen in Tsuen Wan, the group not only developed mid- to high-end restaurants in the area but also opened a Maxim’s Fast Food outlet. This newly designed fast-food restaurant offered not only traditional Chinese dishes such as congee, noodles, and rice but also Western-style teppanyaki and Japanese set meals, expanding the variety of dining options available to local residents.

After the opening of the Luk Yeung Sun Chuen branch, Maxim’s expanded further in 1984 with two more outlets in 1984, one next to the Sino Centre on Nathan Road in Mong Kok and another at Amoy Gardens in Ngau Tau Kok. Between 1986 and 1990, the brand continued its expansion, opening outlets in Choi Wan Estate in Ngau Chi Wan, Wo Che Estate in Sha Tin, Sun Chui Estate in Tai Wai, Chuk Yuen Estate in Wong Tai Sin, Heng Fa Chuen, Kornhill Garden in Quarry Bay, Whampoa Garden in Hung Hom, Connaught Road Central, Queen's Road Central, Leighton Centre in Causeway Bay, Chi Fu Landmark in Pok Fu Lam, Tai Wo Estate in Tai Po, To Kwa Wan, Cheung Fat Estate in Tsing Yi, Butterfly Estate in Tuen Mun, Yuen Long Plaza, Sun Kwai Hing Garden, Yue Man Square and Tsui Ping North Estate in Kwun Tong, increasing the number of Maxim’s Fast Food outlets to 32, spanning across Hong Kong Island, Kowloon, and the New Territories.

In 1993, Maxim’s opened a fast-food restaurant on Huanshi Road in Guangzhou and a bakery on North Sichuan Road in Shanghai. In 1994, the company further expanded by opening a total of four fast-food outlets and four bakeries across Guangzhou, Foshan, and Shanghai. Unfortunately, the business in the Chinese market incurred losses, and Maxim’s eventually withdrew from the market. Reflecting on the experience, Wu Chim Tak noted that although foreign capital was allowed to operate restaurants through joint ventures at the time, the general managers sent by Maxim’s to oversee product quality and operations often found themselves out of sync with the personnel assigned by the Chinese side, who were responsible for human resources and government affairs, leading to cooperation difficulties. Furthermore, the high-end consumer market in China was not yet mature. At the time, ordinary diners could fill up for just six or seven yuan at a local restaurant, whereas a Maxim’s meal in Guangzhou cost fifteen yuan. Since the market was not ready, withdrawal became the only option.
