= Sau Mau Ping Memorial Park =

Park in Kwun Tong, Hong Kong

Coordinates: 22.3182°N 114.2288°E

- 秀茂坪紀念公園
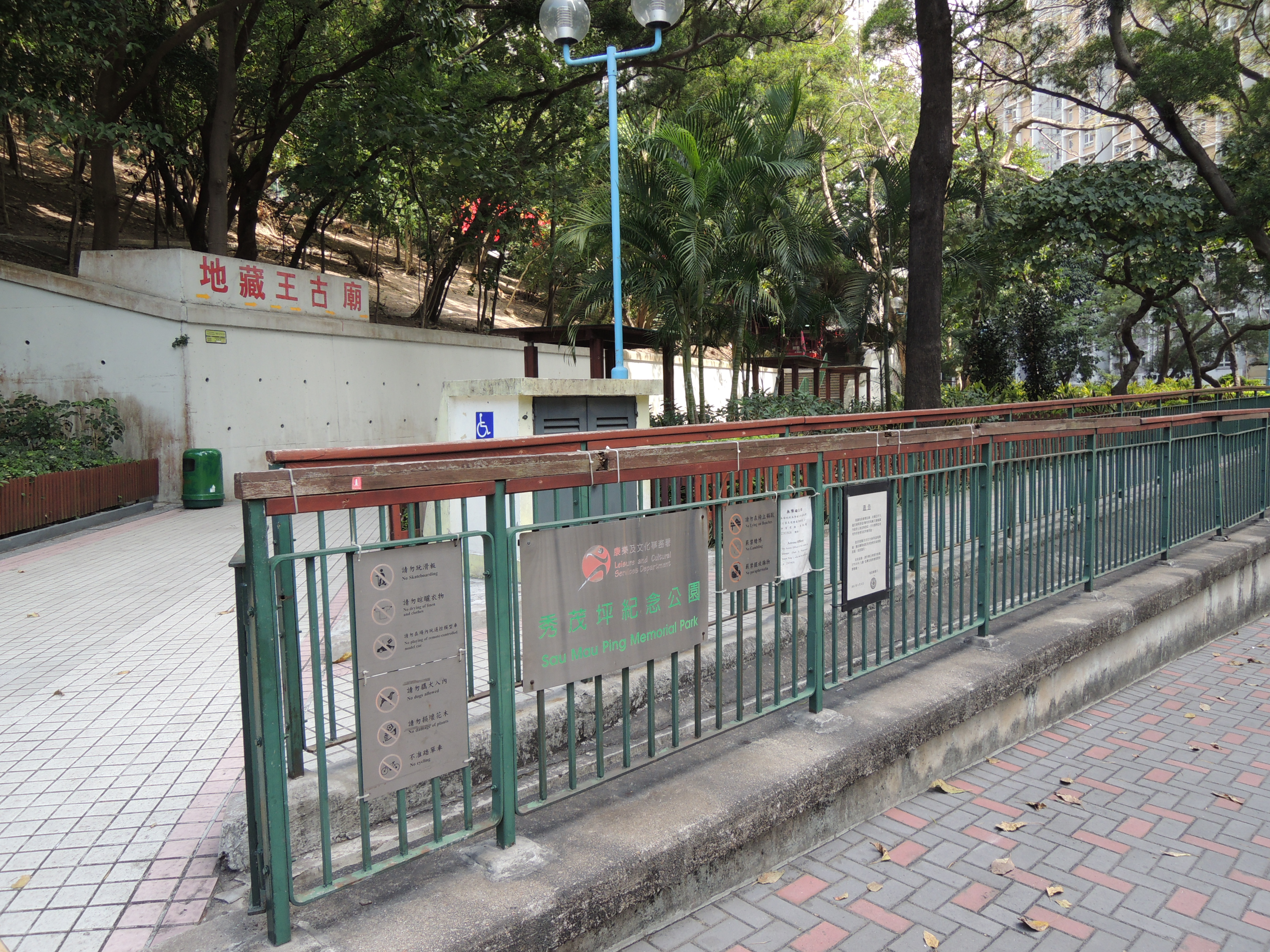
- Interactive map of Sau Mau Ping Memorial Park
- Location: Sau Mau Ping, Kowloon
- Opened: 1976; 50 years ago
- Operator: Leisure and Cultural Services Department
- Open: Year round
- Public transit: Kwun Tong station

Sau Mau Ping Memorial Park (Chinese: 秀茂坪紀念公園) is a park located in Sau Mau Ping, Kwun Tong District, Kowloon, Hong Kong. The park was built on the hillside between Tsui Ping Road, Hiu Kwong Street and Hiu Ming Street, in memorial to the deceased of the disastrous flooding on 18 June 1972 (also known as June 18 flooding, in Chinese: 六一八水災), which took 71 lives when the hill slope adjacent to the park failed.

== History ==
On 30 June 1972, the Land Development Planning Committee decided that the site of the landslide should be reserved for the construction of an open space to serve as a memorial rather than a school, for which the site had previously been earmarked. The collapsed slope was rebuilt with a gentler gradient and improved drainage infrastructure to ensure stability. The Urban Council originally planned to build a garden along with some recreational facilities on the site, including a badminton and basketball court. But owing to the gentler gradient, the reconstructed slope occupied more space than the previous one that collapsed and the recreational elements of the memorial were dropped in favour of a simpler garden.

The park was completed in 1976. A stairway and pathway climbs the slope and links up with Hiu Kwong Street and a rest garden. A 560-square-metre section of land next to Kwun Tong Maryknoll College was added to the memorial park in the early 1980s.

== Neighbouring locations ==
- Hong Kong Institute of Vocational Education
- Wo Lok Estate
- Po Pui Court
- Hiu Lai Court

== See also ==
- History of Hong Kong
