= Tsui Ping Estate =

Coordinates: 22.3127°N 114.2312°E

Tsui Ping Estate 翠屏邨
- Housing estate
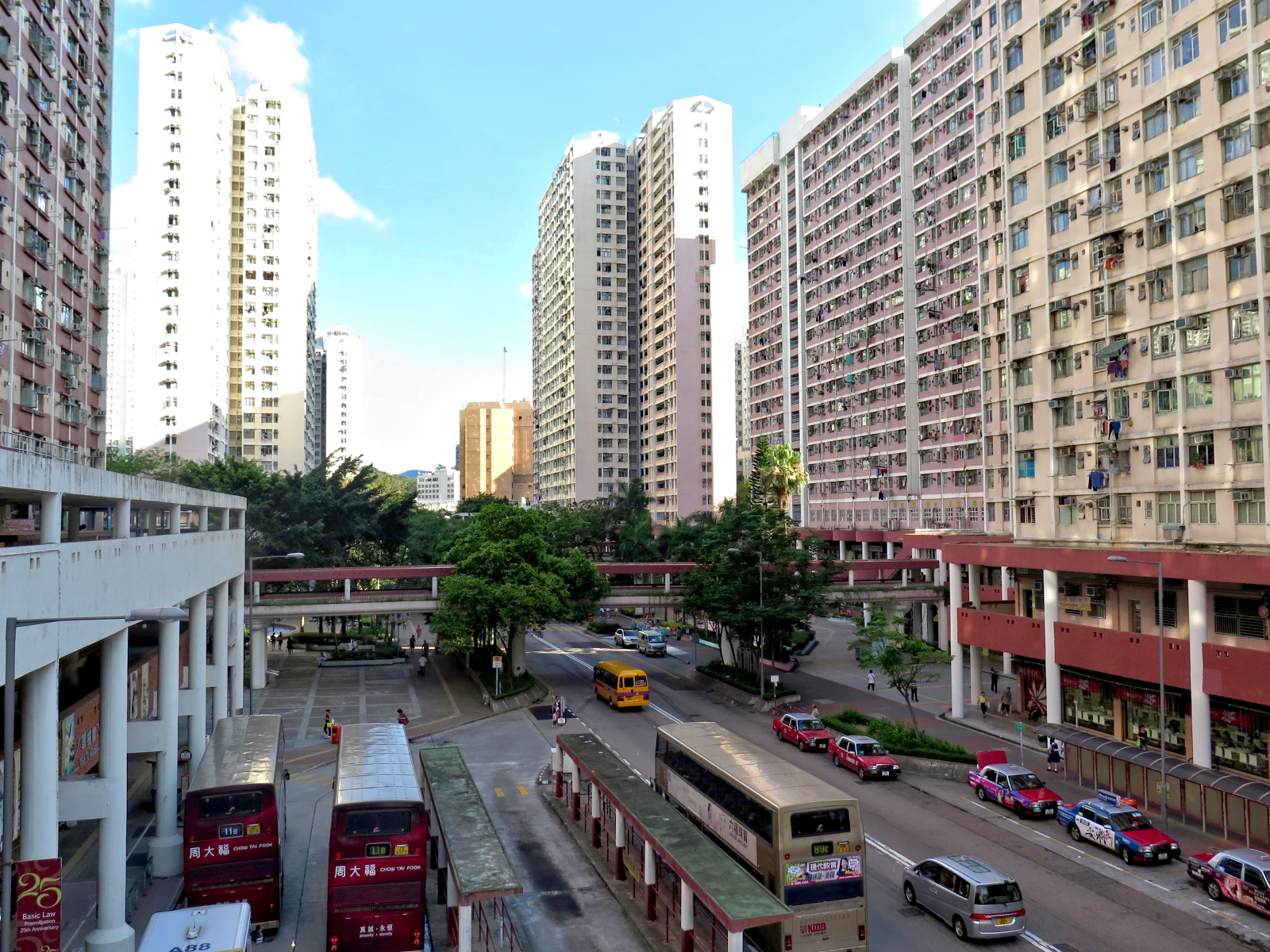
- Tsui Ping (North) Estate
- Interactive map of Tsui Ping Estate
- Area: Kwun Tong
- Opened: 1981

Population (2011)
  - Total: 30,203

Tsui Ping Estate
- Chinese: 翠屏邨
- Cantonese Yale: tseui pìhng tsyūn
Transcriptions
Standard Mandarin
- Hanyu Pinyin: Cuìpíngcūn
Yue: Cantonese
- Yale Romanization: tseui pìhng tsyūn
- Jyutping: ceoi3 ping4 cyun1

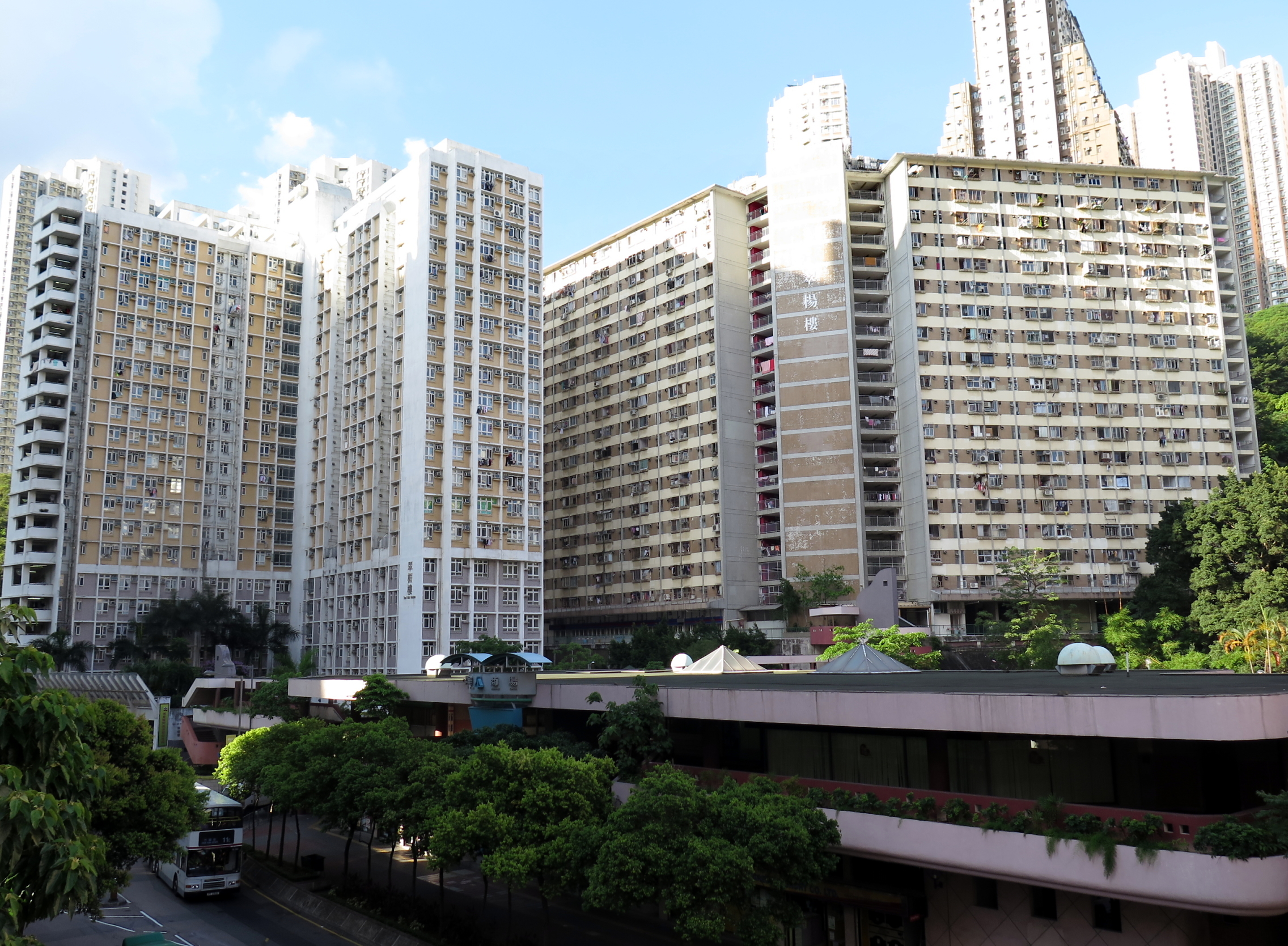
Tsui Ping (North) Estate

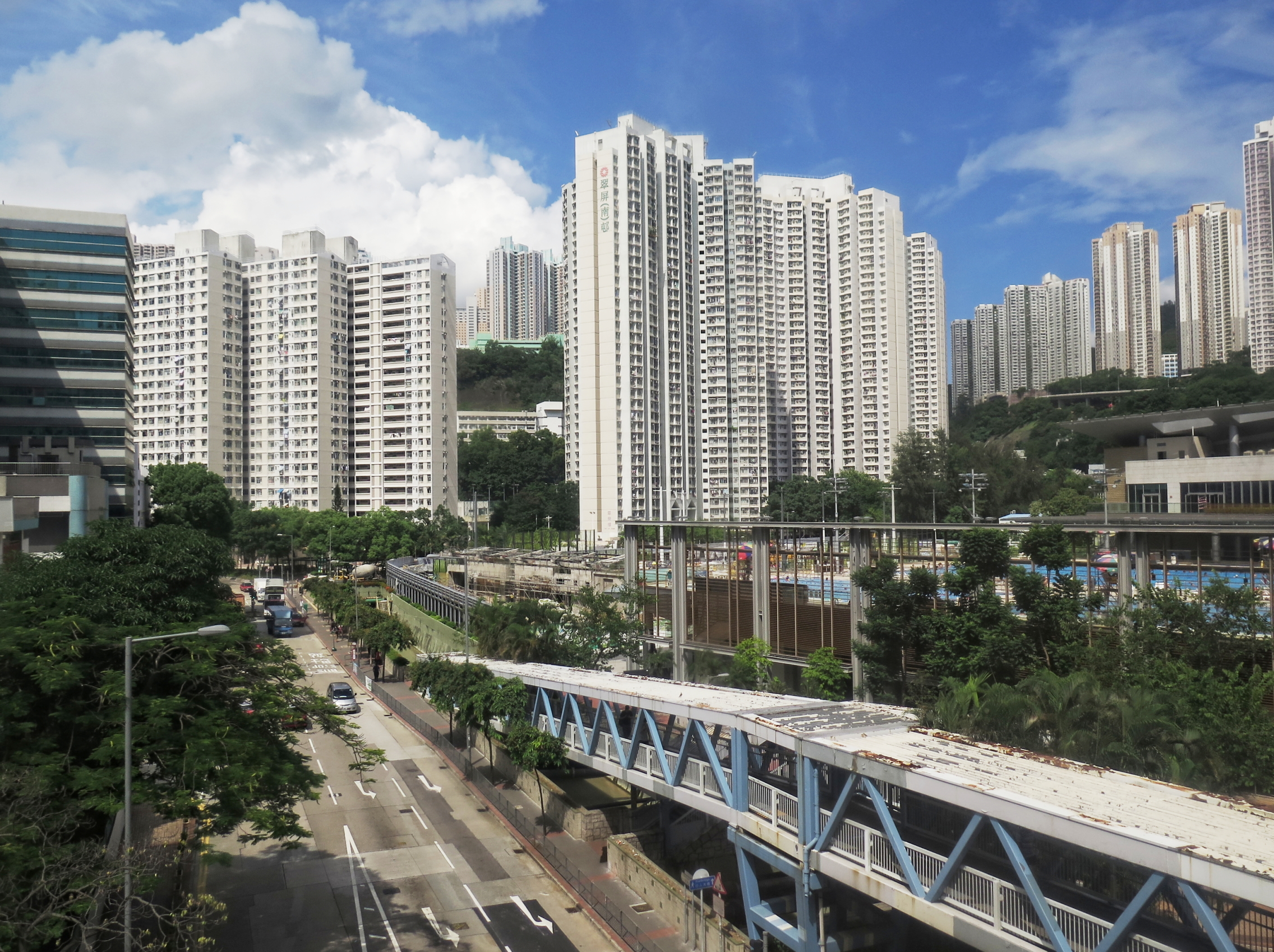
Tsui Ping (South) Estate

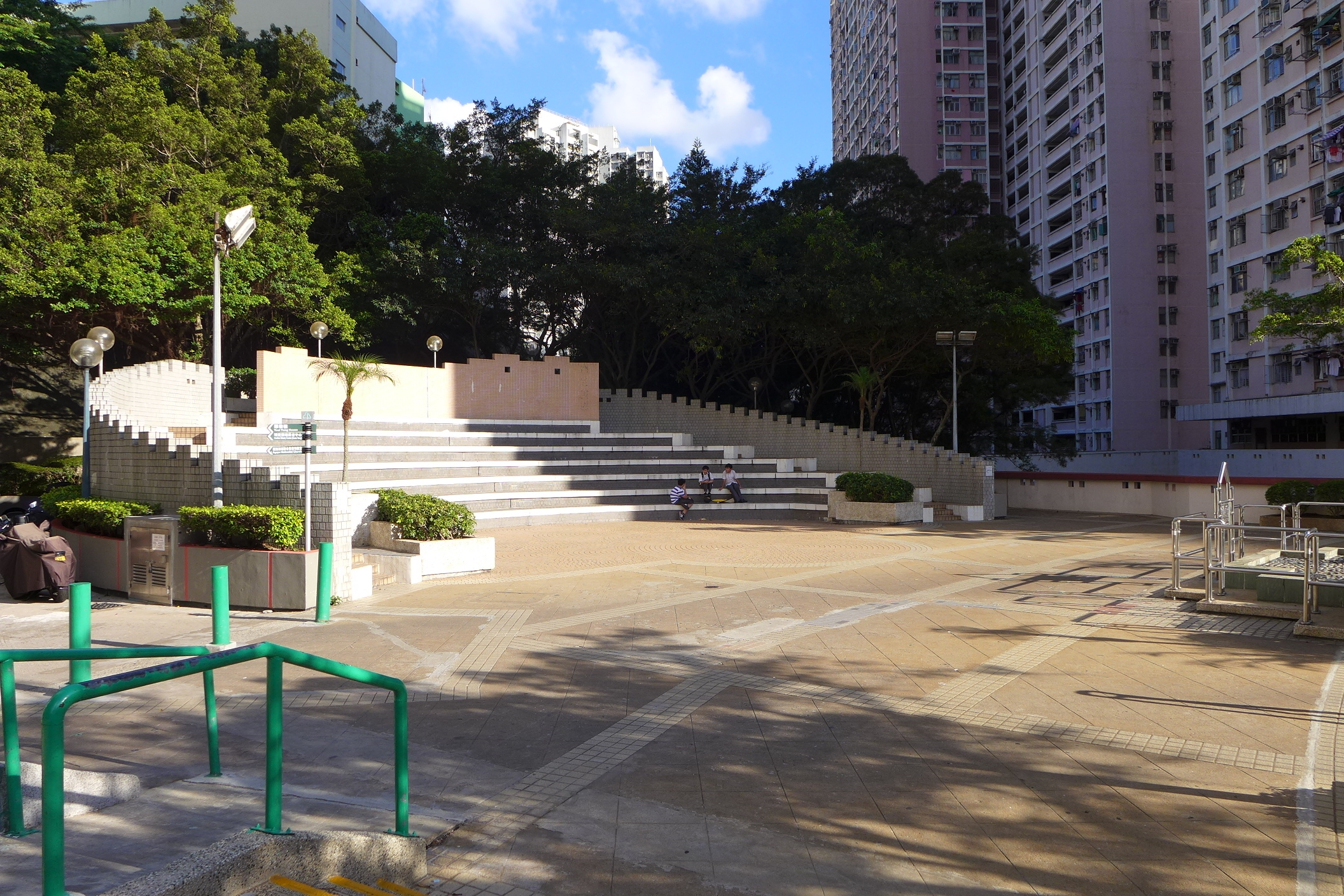
Tsui Ping (South) Open space

Tsui Ping Estate (Chinese: 翠屏邨) is a public housing estate in Kwun Tong, Kowloon, Hong Kong. It is divided into Tsui Ping (South) Estate (翠屏(南)邨) and Tsui Ping (North) Estate (翠屏(北)邨). After redevelopment, the estate has a total of 19 blocks built in the 1980s and 1990s.

== Background ==
Tsui Ping Estate was formerly a resettlement estate, Kwun Tong Resettlement Estate (觀塘徙置屋邨), commonly known as Kai Liu (雞寮), which was built in the 1960s. It was the first resettlement estate in Kwun Tong District. The residents were mainly Chaozhou people. There were no kitchens or washrooms inside the flats. The roof was commonly used as school classrooms and community activities area. In 1972 the estate was inundated with mud from a nearby landslide that killed 71. The site of the disaster is commemorated by the Sau Mau Ping Memorial Park.

In 1973, to avoid the confusion with another estate, Kwun Tong Estate, Kwun Tong Resettlement Estate was renamed as Kwun Tong (Tsui Ping Road) Estate (觀塘(翠屏道)邨). The estate was renamed as Tsui Ping Estate after it was redeveloped between the 1980s and 1990s. In 2002, some of the flats in Tsui Ping (North) Estate (Tsui Mei House excluded) were sold to tenants through Tenants Purchase Scheme Phase 5.

== Features ==
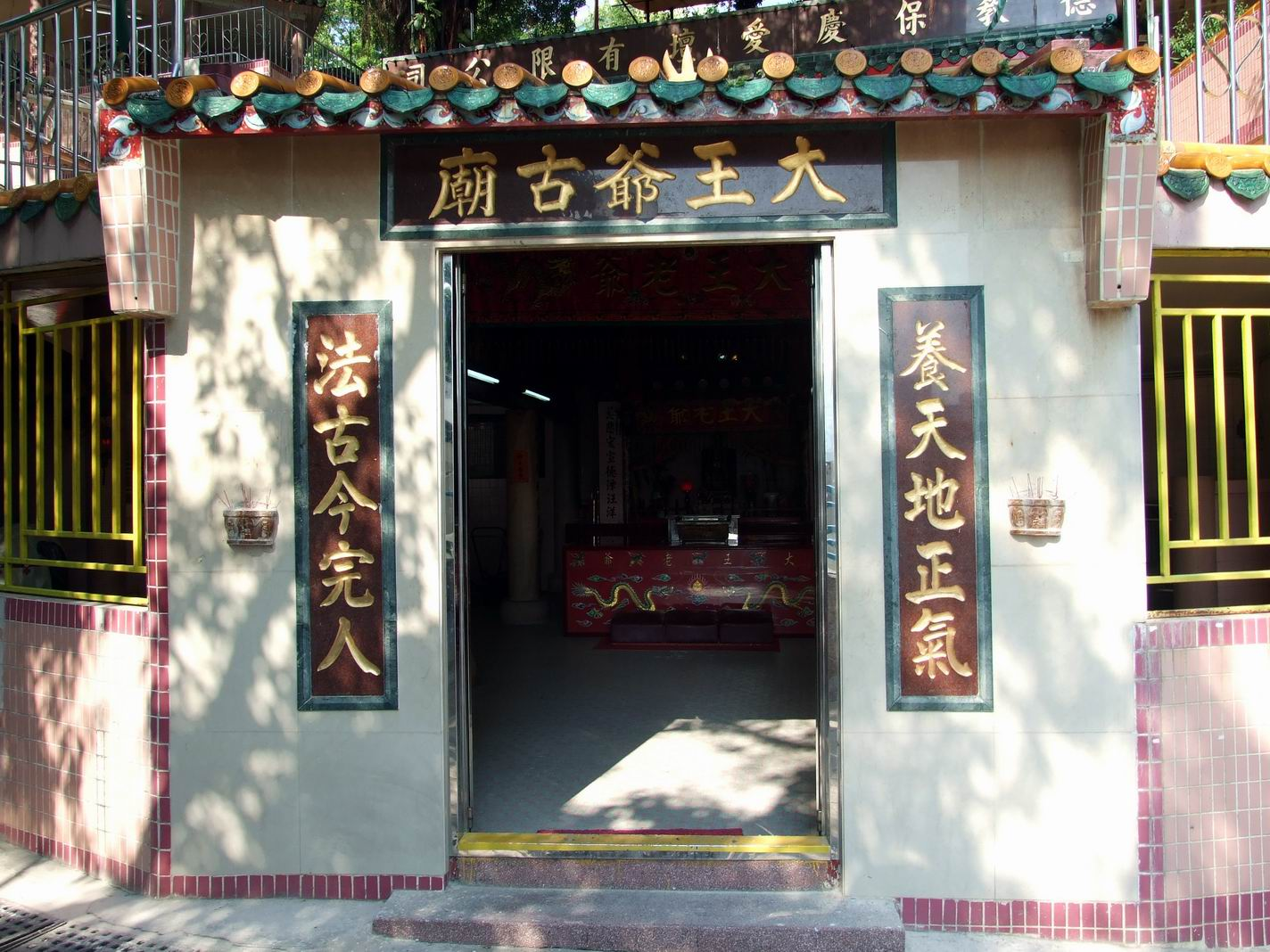
Tai Wong Ye Temple in Tsui Ping (South) Estate

A Tai Wong Ye Temple (大王爺廟) is located on the hill behind Tsui Ying House of Tsui Ping (South) Estate. The origin of the temple was a shrine located in present-day Lok Fu. It was relocated to make space for the building of the Lo Fu Ngam Resettlement Area in 1957. The new site was dedicated in 1963.

== Houses ==
=== Tsui Ping (South) Estate ===
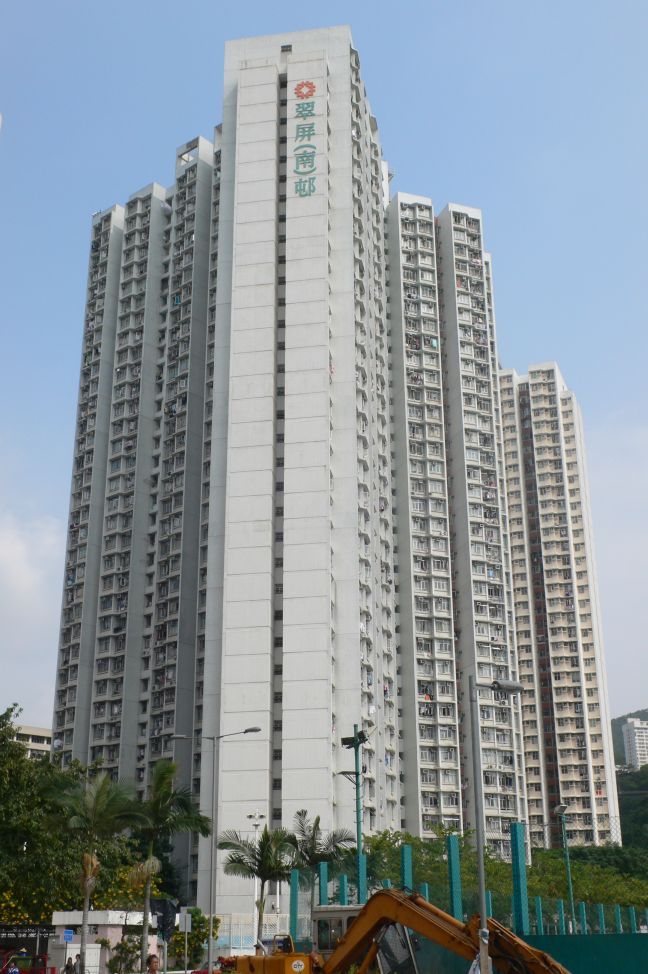
Tsui Lok House, Tsui Ping (South) Estate

Name	Type	Completion
Tsui Ying House	Linear 3	1989
Tsui Tung House	Trident 4	1989
Tsui Chung House	Trident 4	1990
Tsui Lok House	Harmony 2	1995
Tsui Hon House	Harmony 2	1995
Tsui Heng House	Harmony 2	1995
Tsui Wing House	Harmony 2	1995

=== Tsui Ping (North) Estate ===
Name	Type	Completion
Tsui Nam House	Double H	1981
Tsui Yeung House	Old Slab	1981
Tsui To House	Old Slab	1986
Tsui Yung House	Trident 2	1986
Tsui On House	New Slab	1990
Tsui Mui House	Linear 3	1990
Tsui Pak House	Linear 1	1990
Tsui Yue House	Linear 1	1990
Tsui Tsz House	Linear 1	1989
Tsui Lau House	Linear 1	1989
Tsui Cheung House	Linear 1	1994
Tsui Mei House	Small Household	1998

== Buildings and public facilities nearby ==
- Community services facilities
  - Hong Kong Public Records Building
  - Kwun Tong Community Centre
  - Kwun Tong Swimming Pool
- Schools
  - Our Lady Of China Catholic Primary School
  - IVE Kwun Tong Campus
  - SKH Leung Kwai Yee Secondary School
  - The Mission Convent Church Holm Glad College
  - CCC Mong Man Wai College
- Public housing estates
  - Wo Lok Estate
  - Po Pui Court

== Education ==
Tsui Ping Estate is in Primary One Admission (POA) School Net 48. Within the school net are multiple aided schools (operated independently but funded with government money) and Kwun Tong Government Primary School.
