= Kwun Tong Government Secondary School =

Government school in Kwun Tong, Kowloon, Hong Kong

Coordinates: 22.33302°N 114.22697°E

- 觀塘官立中學
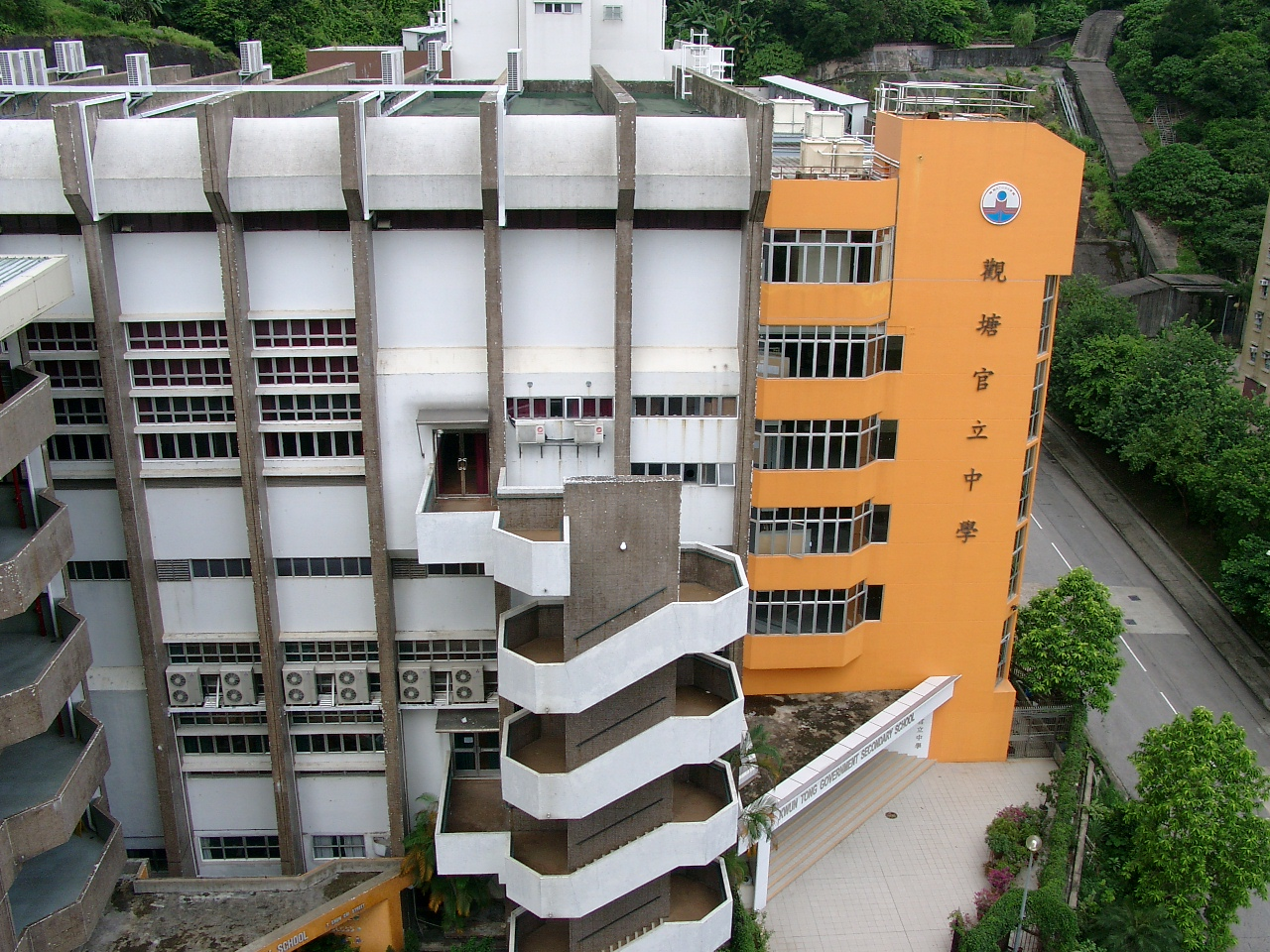
- Kwun Tong Government Secondary School

Location
- 9 Shun Chi Street, Shun Chi Court, Shun Lee, Kwun Tong, Kowloon; Hong Kong

Information
- Type: Government school, EMI school
- Motto: Try my best; reach my crest
- Established: 1982 (45th Anniversary)
- Principal: Ho Ngar Yin, Assunta
- Teaching staff: 55
- Gender: Co-educational
- Classes: 25
- Houses: Sing(Green), Shun(Red), Kan(Yellow), Him(Blue)
- Student Union/Association: Möbius (2026-27)
- Song: KTGSS School Song
- Website: www.ktgss.edu.hk

Kwun Tong Government Secondary School
- Traditional Chinese: 觀塘官立中學
- Simplified Chinese: 观塘官立中学
Transcriptions
Standard Mandarin
- Hanyu Pinyin: Guàntáng Guān Lì Zhōngxué
Yue: Cantonese
- Jyutping: gun1 tong4 gun1 laap6 zung1 hok6

Kwun Tong Government Secondary School (Chinese: 觀塘官立中學; often abbreviated as KTGSS) is a co-educational and English-as-Medium-of-Instruction government secondary school. Founded in 1982, it is located at 9 Shun Chi Street, Shun Chi Court, Shun Lee, Kowloon, Hong Kong.

== History ==
The school was established as a grammar school in 1982 by the Government of British Hong Kong.

In January 2023, the school required teachers to vet speeches from guest speakers and check their presentation materials to correct any "inappropriate remarks", saying that "speakers need to submit their speech or presentation slides in advance, and cannot promote political messages or express a political stance."

In 2026, the school is celebrating its 45^{th} anniversary with a series of events.

== Student union ==
Year	Candidate cabinet	Elected union
2026–27	Möbius	Möbius (won with 345 votes of confidence, 44.7%; 362 votes of non-confidence, 46.9%; 65 invalid votes, 8.4%)
2025–26	Polaris	Polaris (won with 383 votes of confidence, 47.7%; 315 votes of non-confidence, 39.3%; 104 invalid votes, 12.9%)
2024–25	Pharos, Ev. After	Pharos (won with 368 votes, 45.9%) Ev. After (276 votes, 34.5%)
2023–24	Aslan, Orizuru	Aslan (won with 358 votes, 45.32%) Orizuru (278 votes, 35.19%) (154 invalid votes, 19.49%)
2022–23	Artemis	Artemis (won with 374 votes of confidence)
2021–22	Eureka, Miss U	Miss U
2020–21	Sirius	Sirius
2019–20	Endeavour, Paladin, Altaïr	Paladin
2018–19	Falcon, EOS	Falcon
2017–18	Legend (withdrew in 1st round), Puzzle (1st round); Triangle (2nd round), Avalon (2nd round), Ultra (2nd round)	Ultra
2016–17	Zenith, Epic	Epic
2015–16	4ward, 直閣, APPS	4ward
2014–15	Alpha, Unicorn, Nova	Unicorn
2013–14	Sparkle (1st round); AsYou (2nd round)	AsYou

== School song, motto, and principals ==
=== School motto ===
誠信勤謙

Honesty, Faith, Diligence and Modesty

=== School principals ===
Name of the school principal	Sequence	Year
Mrs To Kwong Wai Yin, Ella	Founding principal	1982–1995
	2	1995–2000
Mrs CHAN Ping-kuen	3	2000–2005
Mr SO Chi-keung	4	2005–2013
Mr LIU Choy-woon, Norman	5	2013–2018
Ms IP Lai-hung	6	2018–2026
Ms HO Ngar-yin, Assunta	Present	2026–

== See also ==
- Education in Hong Kong
- List of schools in Hong Kong
