= 1972 Hong Kong landslides =

Series of landslides in Hong Kong

A series of major landslides occurred in Hong Kong in June 1972. Several apartment complexes and houses were wiped out, and at least 156 people lost their lives. The landslides had been caused by waterlogged soils in the area, a result of Typhoon Rose bringing unusually heavy rainfall in August 1971 as well as heavy rainstorms hitting Hong Kong on the days preceding the landslides.

== Background ==
Po Shan Road in the Mid-Levels was the site of the largest major landslide to occur in June 1972. The area in general had long been susceptible to landslips and rockfall since it was developed; several other major landslides had occurred at or near Po Shan Road before 1972. These included a large landslip in 1925, which caused many deaths, as well as large but relatively undamaging landslides in 1941, 1950 and 1966. Most of these had been caused by heavy rainstorms, in a similar manner to the 1972 landslides. Shiu Fai Terrace, another site of landslips, had been leased in 1920 and the number and height of buildings that could be built on it had been restricted, probably decreasing the death toll of the 1972 disasters.

On 18 June, to cope with the disasters, all British Forces in the colony were mobilised, all police and fire services leave was cancelled, and the Civil Aid Service and Auxiliary Medical Services were called to assist in rescue operations.

== Shiu Fai Terrace ==
Multiple landslides also occurred at Shiu Fai Terrace in Wan Chai. In total, three large landslips occurred over a continuous area on June 16. They were not as large as the Po Shan Road disaster but altogether affected a greater area. Several were killed by the landslips.

Throughout June 1972, multiple incidents of landslides occurred throughout Hong Kong, especially in Wan Chai. In total, combined with the Po Shan and Shiu Fai landslides, the landslips killed around 148 people. While they severely crippled infrastructure and emergency services through Hong Kong, the landslides of 1972 have led to improved guidelines for hillside excavation and safety and rescue procedures.

== Sau Mau Ping landslide ==
At midday on 18 June, a landslide buried a squatter village at the Sau Mau Ping licensed area, killing 71. The mud spilled over Tsui Ping Road into the Kwun Tong Resettlement Estate. Resettlement Department staff and fathers of the adjacent Kwun Tong Maryknoll College launched the rescue operation. They were joined by around 600 personnel from the army, police, fire services, Civil Aid Service, and Auxiliary Medical Service. Many of those killed were children. Survivors were billeted at the Kun Tong Police Station and the Sau Mau Ping Resettlement Estate.

The collapsed hill slope was reconstructed with a gentler grade. The disaster site is now home to the Sau Mau Ping Memorial Park, opened 1976.

== Po Shan Road landslide ==
On June 16, 1972, several minor slips of mud were noticed along Po Shan Road. The road was blocked off by falling mud at a construction site and several cracks started to appear in a retaining wall. Inspections were performed on many structures but as it was raining, ultimately no major evacuation or alert measures were taken. On June 17, a slip had occurred over the whole width of the cut slope at the southern face of Inland Lot 2260 on Po Shan Road, carrying away nearly all the bamboo framing and metal sheet covering. In addition, authorities noticed severe subsidence of several buildings around IL 2260. Residents were then urged to leave their houses and apartments as a precaution.

On June 18, it was still raining, and the situation had gotten worse. Cracks continued to appear in retaining walls, and mud had started to fall on nearby Conduit Road. Po Shan Road was cordoned off to the public and nearby apartments were evacuated as it quickly became apparent that a large landslide would soon occur.

A little after 5 p.m. that day, a huge mass of rocks, mud and vegetation suddenly broke free and slid down the side of IL 2260, breaking through a retaining wall on Kotewall Road and completely blocking Conduit Road. There were no deaths directly resulting from this slip, however. Then, some time after 8 p.m., an even larger landslip occurred starting at IL 2260 and, in less than ten seconds, cleared a path from Po Shan Road to Kotewall Road, destroying several houses and retaining walls in the process. Upon hitting Kotewall Road, the slip knocked Kotewall Court (the only well-lit building in the area at the time) completely off of its foundation and collapsed several flats at Robinson Road and Babington Path. 67 people were killed and 20 were injured in less than a minute

Because of the lack of lighting and the rain, as well as the fact that much of the transportation network had been destroyed, rescue efforts were initially sporadic and hampered. Some landslips continued to occur, causing withdrawals of emergency personnel. More than an hour had passed when the first survivors were pulled from the rubble, at 9:24. Eventually, however, most known survivors had been rescued in the next several days.
