= Babington Path =

Street on Hong Kong Island, Hong Kong

Coordinates: 22.283557°N 114.141233°E

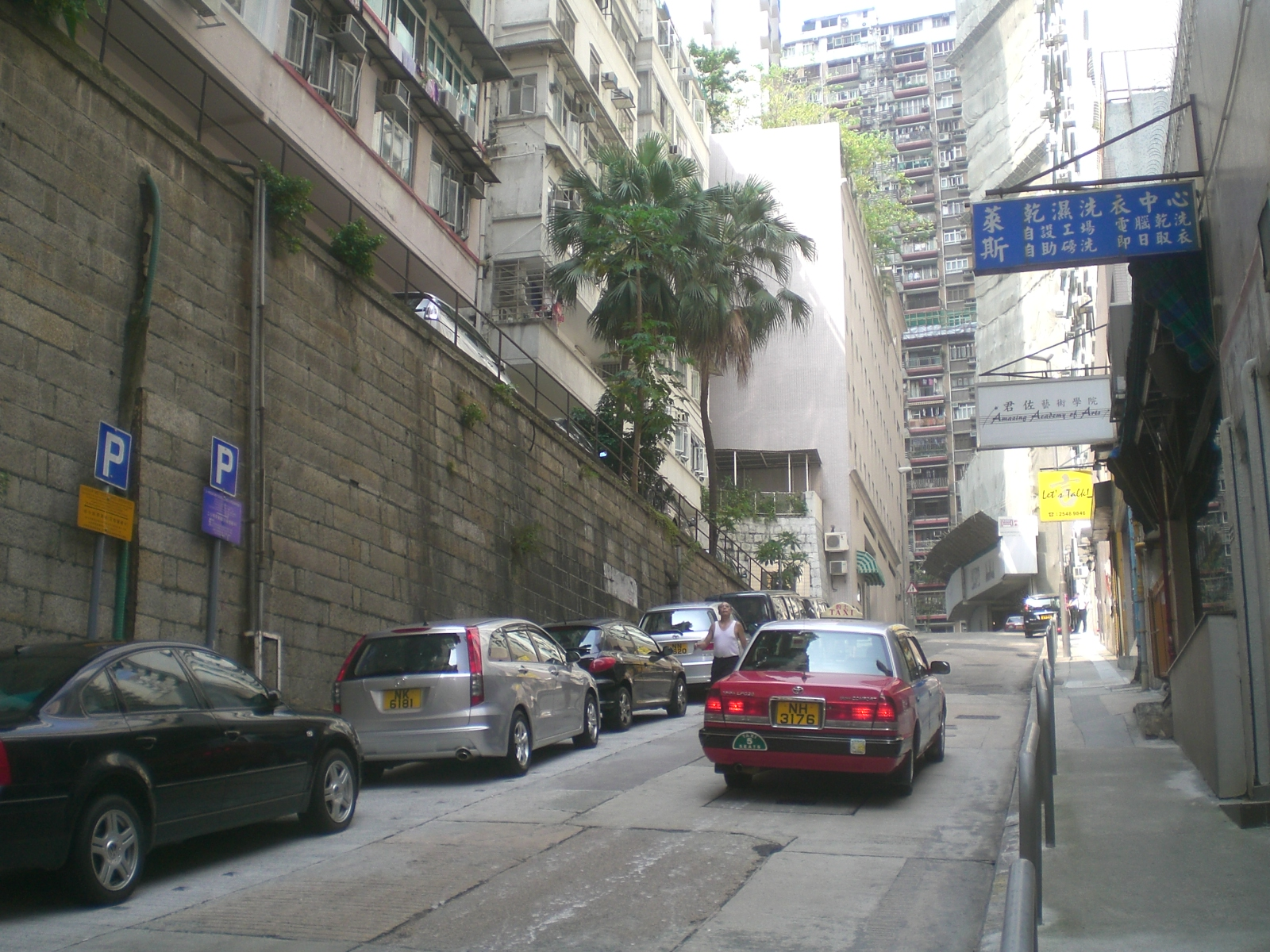
Babington Path

Babington Path (Chinese: 巴丙頓道) is a street in Mid-Levels, Hong Kong Island spanning from the junction between Bonham Road, Park Road, Oaklands Path and St. Stephen's Lane uphill to Robinson Road. The street is intersected halfway up its ascent by Lyttelton Road.

== Features ==
There are two restaurants along the road, one being a dessert shop (糖痴豆) and the other being a noodle shop Chi Kei (枝記麵家). The other places along the road are residential dwellings, an artisan coffee shop, and there are also multiple tutorial centres along the road.

== In popular culture ==
In the novel "Love in a Fallen City" by the famous writer Eileen Chang, the protagonist Bai Liusu and the male lead Fan Liuyan lived in a house on Babington Road.

== See also ==
- 1972 Hong Kong landslides
- List of streets and roads in Hong Kong
