= Kwun Tong =

Area in Kowloon, Hong Kong

Kwun Tong 觀塘
- Neighbourhood
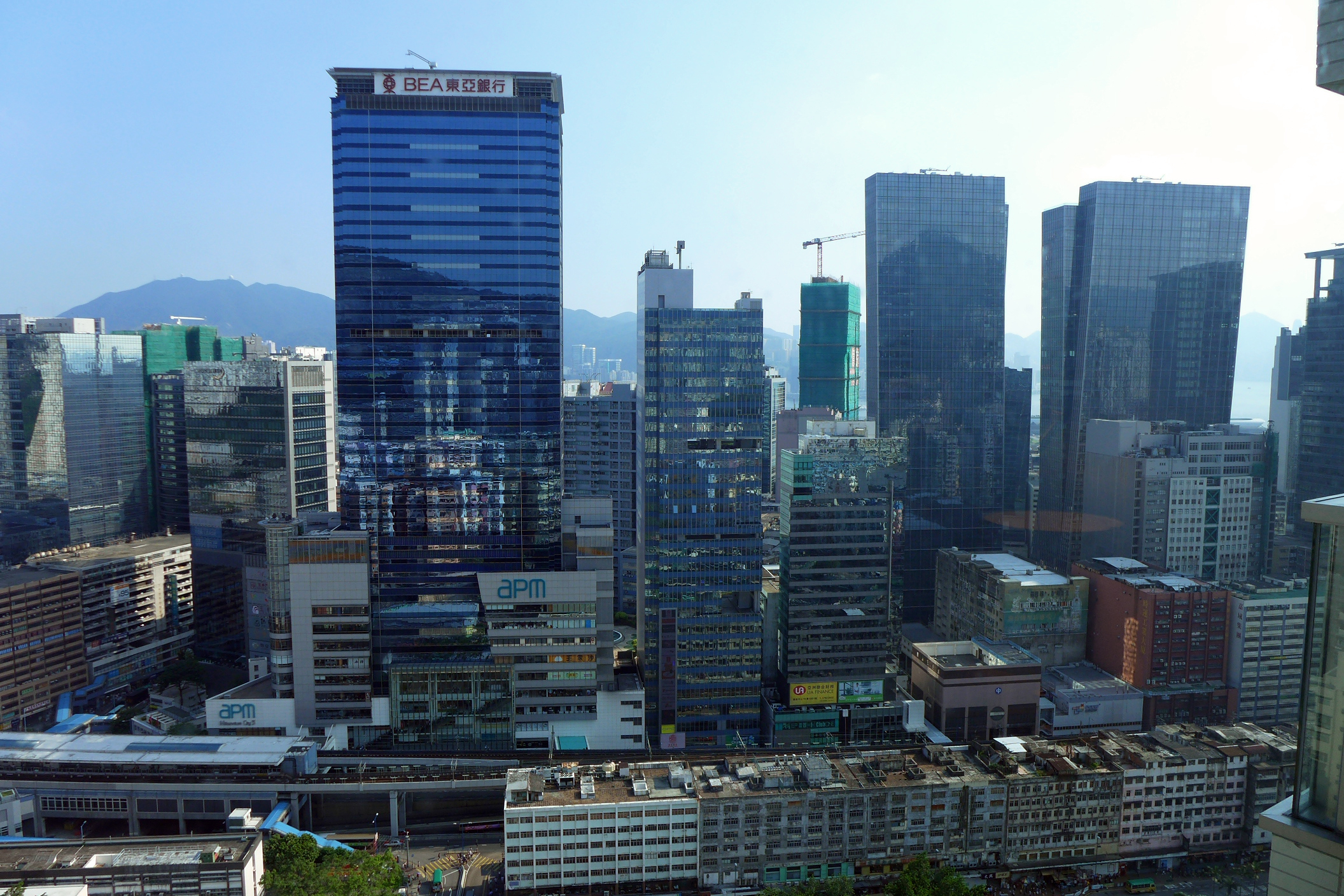
- Kwun Tong Town Centre
- Interactive map of Kwun Tong
- Coordinates: 22.315°N 114.225°E
- Country: Hong Kong
- District: Kwun Tong District
- Time zone: UTC+8 (Hong Kong Time)

Kwun Tong
- Traditional Chinese: 觀塘 (originally '官塘')
- Simplified Chinese: 观塘
- Jyutping: Gun1 tong4
- Literal meaning: "viewing a pond"
Transcriptions
Standard Mandarin
- Hanyu Pinyin: Guāntáng
Yue: Cantonese
- Yale Romanization: Gūn tòhng
- Jyutping: Gun1 tong4
- IPA: [kun˥.tʰɔŋ˩]

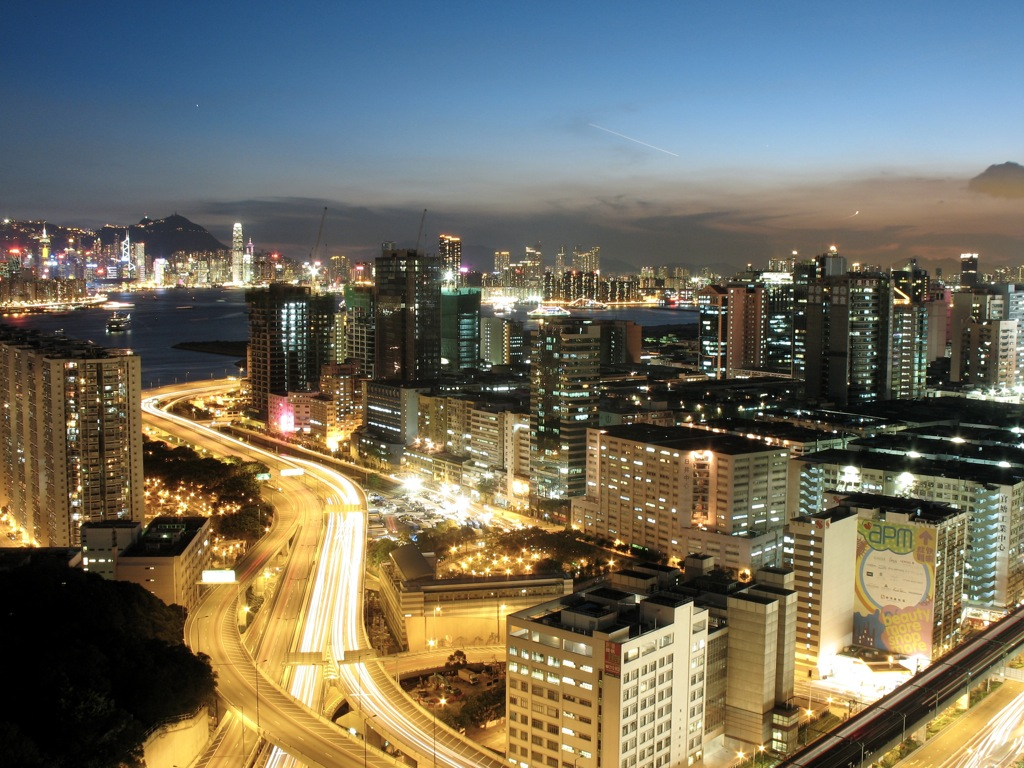
Kwun Tong Industrial Area

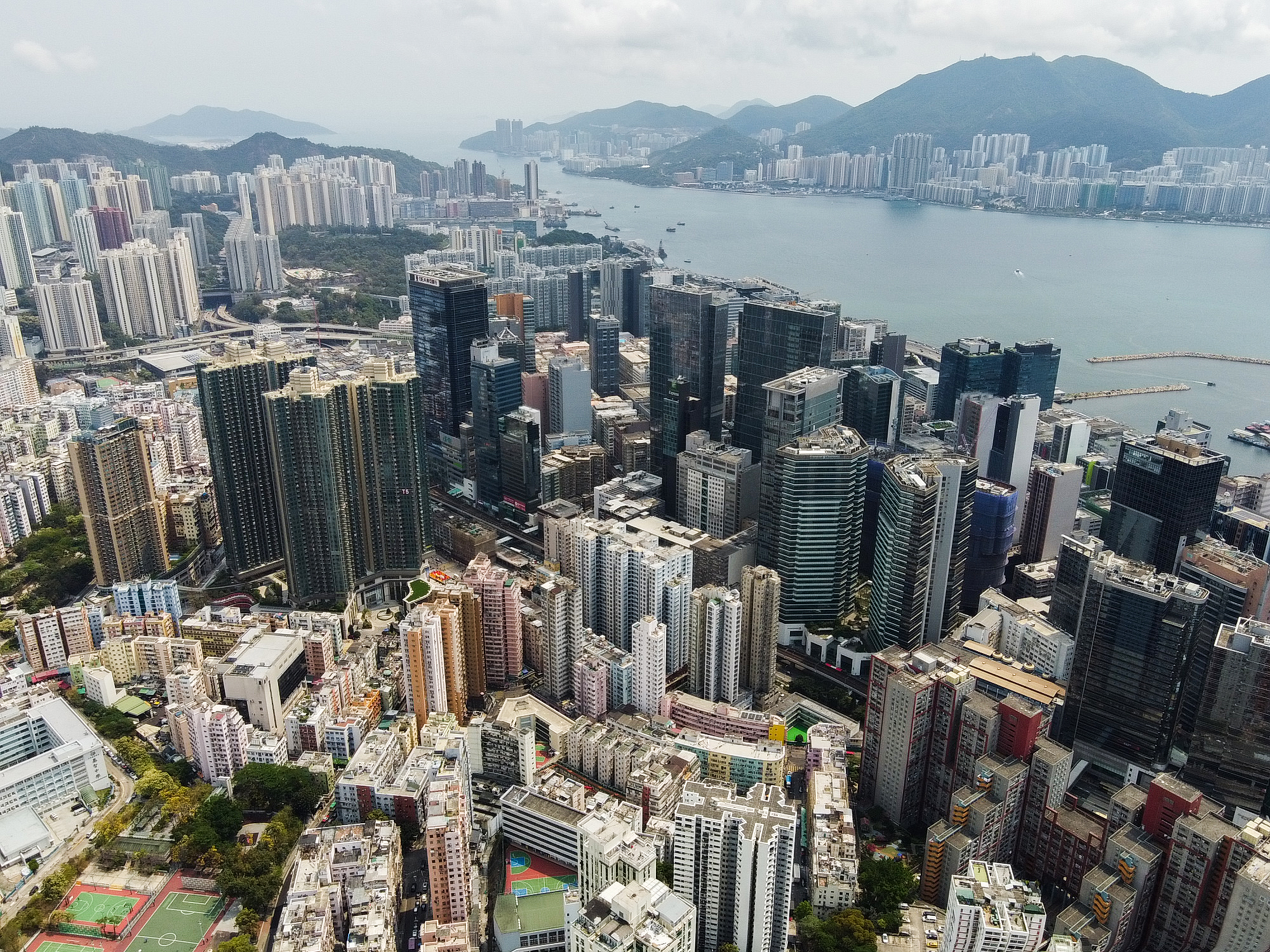
Kwun Tong Business Area aerial view

Kwun Tong is an area in the Kwun Tong District of Hong Kong, situated at the eastern part of the Kowloon Peninsula, and its boundary stretches from Lion Rock in the north to Lei Yue Mun in the south, and from the winding paths of Kowloon Peak in the east to the north coast of the former Kai Tak Airport runway in the west.

One of the first new towns in Hong Kong, Kwun Tong was, and remains, a major industrial area. Its population has been growing rapidly, and the demand for housing, medical and educational facilities and services has been increasing. In view of this, a number of community development projects, such as the redevelopment of old housing estates and the construction of major parks, have been implemented in recent years. These projects have incorporated a wide range of supporting facilities, like primary and secondary schools, clinics, community centres and open spaces. All these facilities have brought about a new face to the Kwun Tong District, making it a more comfortable place for the people to live.

== History ==
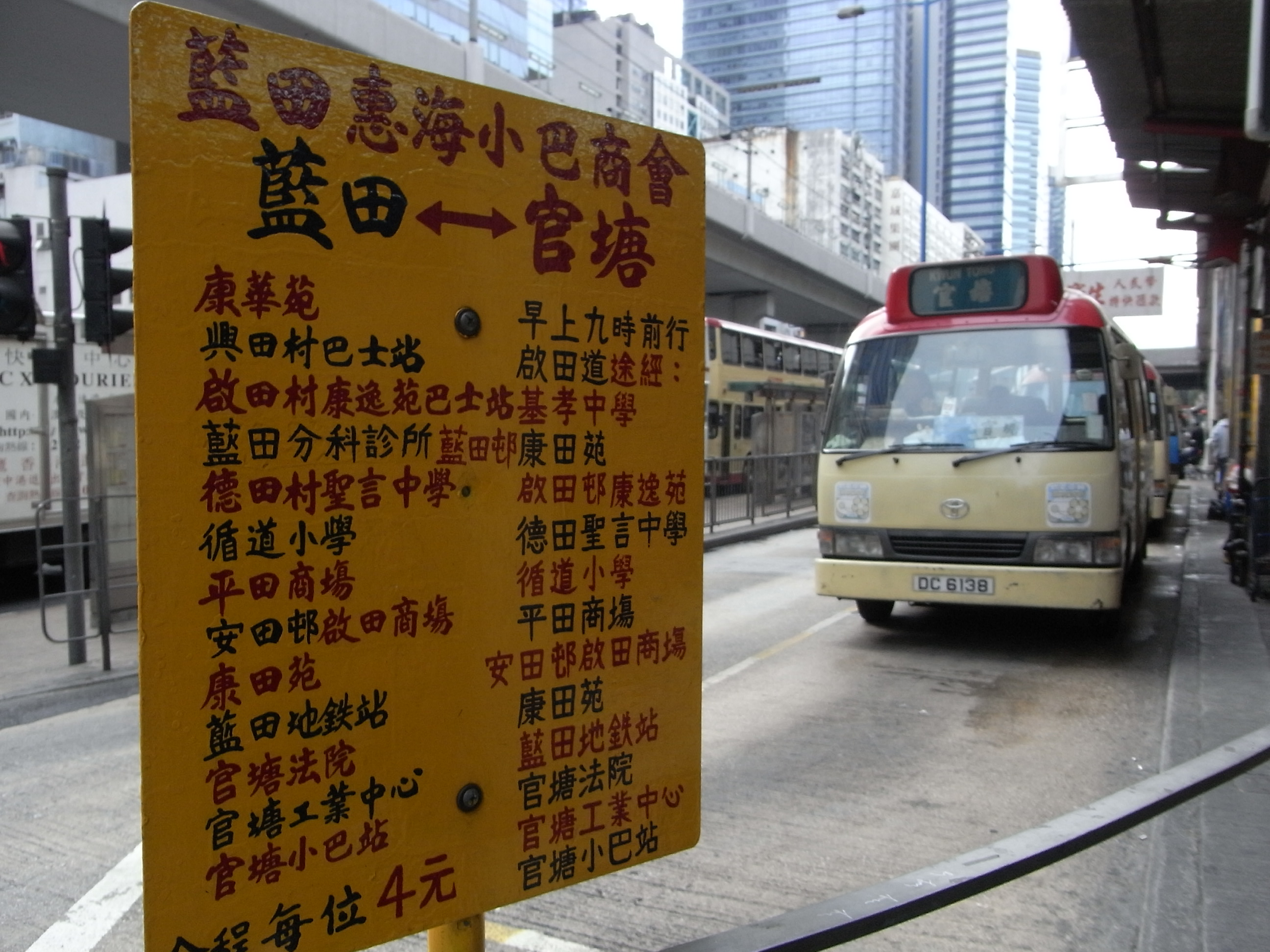
A minibus Stop at Yue Man Square. This handwritten bus stop sign and bus display are still written as "官塘"

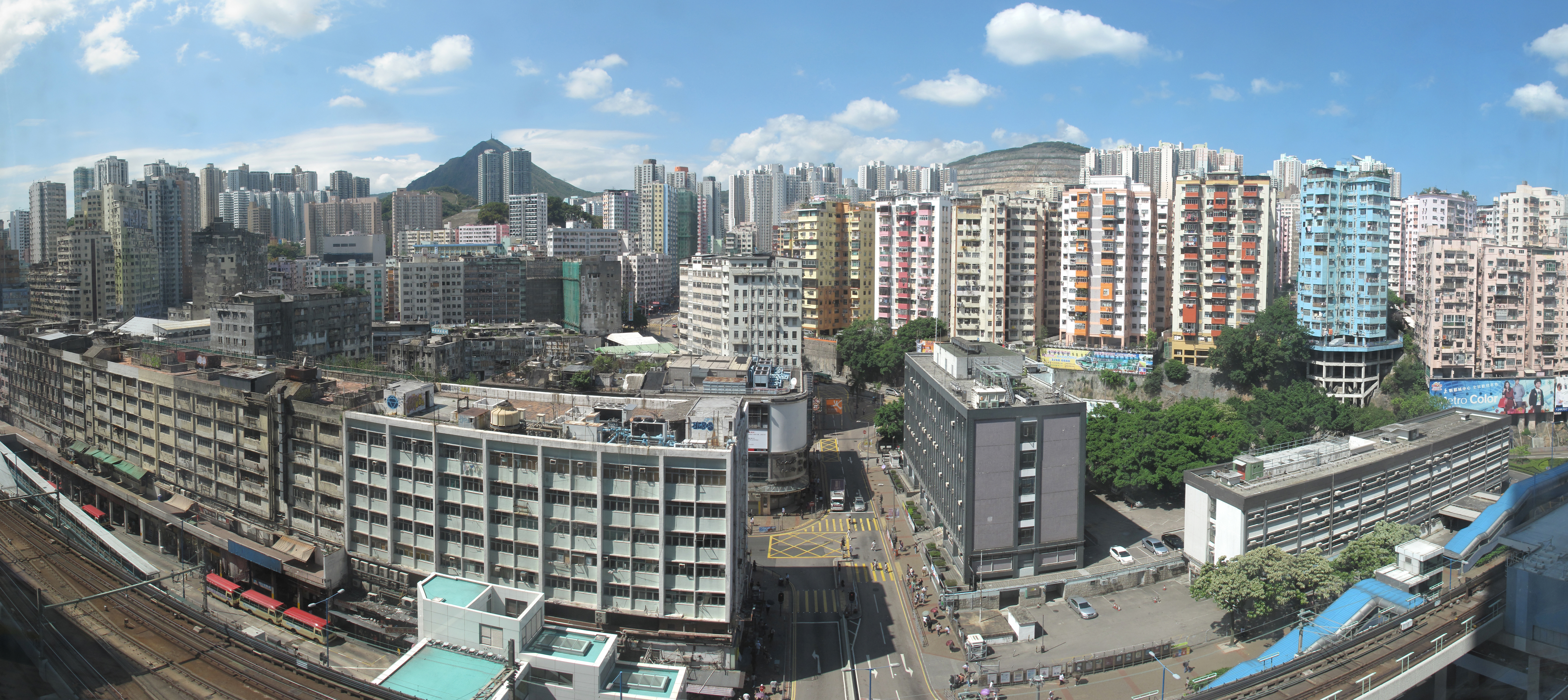
Kwun Tong Town Centre before redevelopment

The Chinese name of Kwun Tong ("觀塘") was formerly written as "官塘" (transcribed as Koon Tong in Cantonese Yale). Despite the identical pronunciation of these two names in Cantonese, they have different meanings. "官塘" literally means Mandarin Pond, which was allegedly named after the Koon Fu salt yards (官富鹽場) set up by the government to secure central administration of the salt trade and prevent unauthorised salt preparation and trading in the Song dynasty. In those days, there were many salt yards in and around Kwun Tong, whose long coastline stretched to as far as Kowloon Bay and To Kwa Wan in the west. Koon Fu salt yards was one of the four largest salt beds in Dongguan province, and was a site of high political significance.

Since the Song Dynasty, troops were stationed there to monitor the salt yards' operation. Despite the government's close watch, illegal salt trade was still active on Lantau Island. When officials tried to tax salt production on the island, in 1197 Lantau Salt farmers instigated a riot to revolt against them. Government authorities ordered Koon Fu administrators to take control, troops were deployed to the island for a full-scale crackdown, resulting in the massacre of many islanders.

Antiques and coins traced back to Northern Song Dynasty and Southern Song Dynasty were discovered in neighbouring Kowloon City district and Wong Tai Sin. Similar coins were also unearthed along the coast of Kwun Tong starting from Kowloon Bay, suggesting that Kwun Tong has already been a relatively prosperous area since then.

According to other stories, Kwun Tong was a typhoon shelter for the Kowloon Water Police, which made it an important political and defence point of south-eastern Kowloon. Black Hill (Ng Kwai Shan), which today rises up behind Lam Tin Estate, was known as Koon Fu Hill (官富山) at that time.

During the Great Clearance in the Qing Dynasty, coastal residents were forced to evacuate inland 50 li (roughly equivalent to 25 Km) to quell support for the anti-Qing loyalists in Taiwan. This caused the salt farms in Kwun Tong to be abandoned. When the ban was lifted in 1669, many of the original inhabitants did not return, re-settlers who came from agricultural backgrounds soon took over, leading to the vanishing of the salt industry in Kwun Tong.

In the 1950s, when Kwun Tong was being developed as a satellite town, the local residents disliked the word Koon (官), which literally means official or government, and they persuaded the Hong Kong government to change the place name to Kwun Tong (觀塘, lit. 'Viewing a Pond'). The development of Kwun Tong spearheaded the construction and planning of new towns in the New Territories, although the first project was limited in scope and did not share the features of self-contained communities like the later ones.

== Features ==
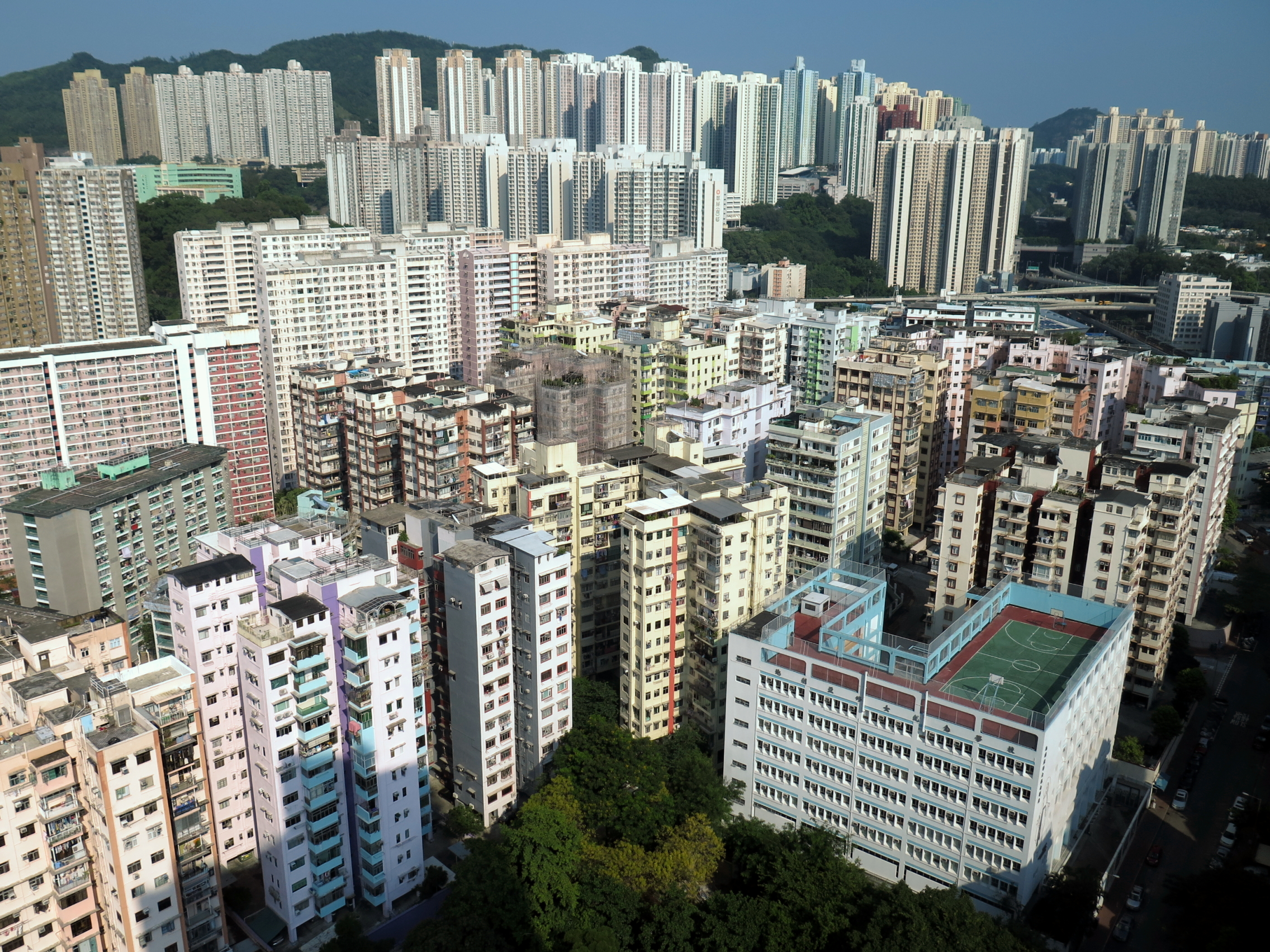
Yuet Wah Street apartments

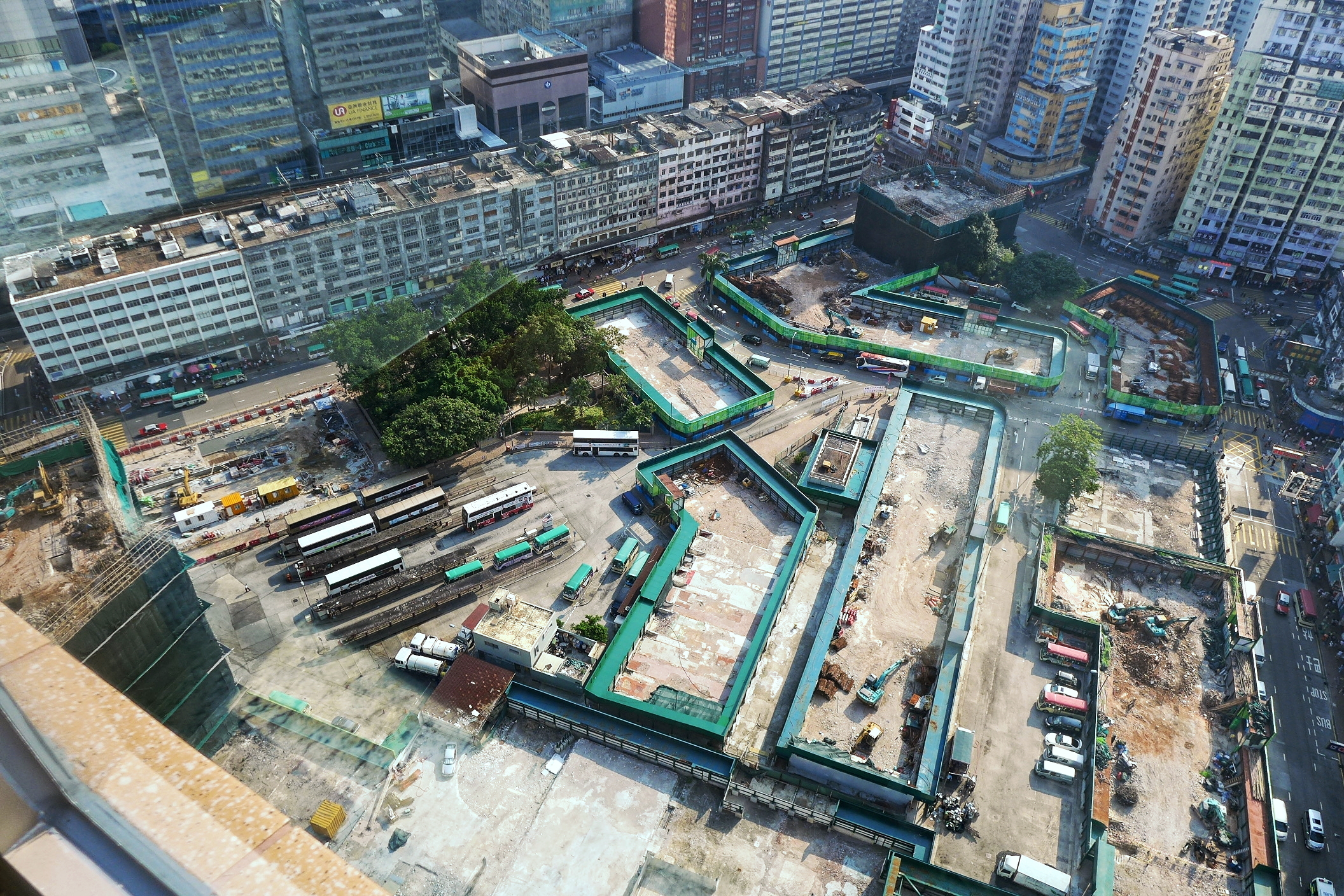
Yue Man Square under redevelopment

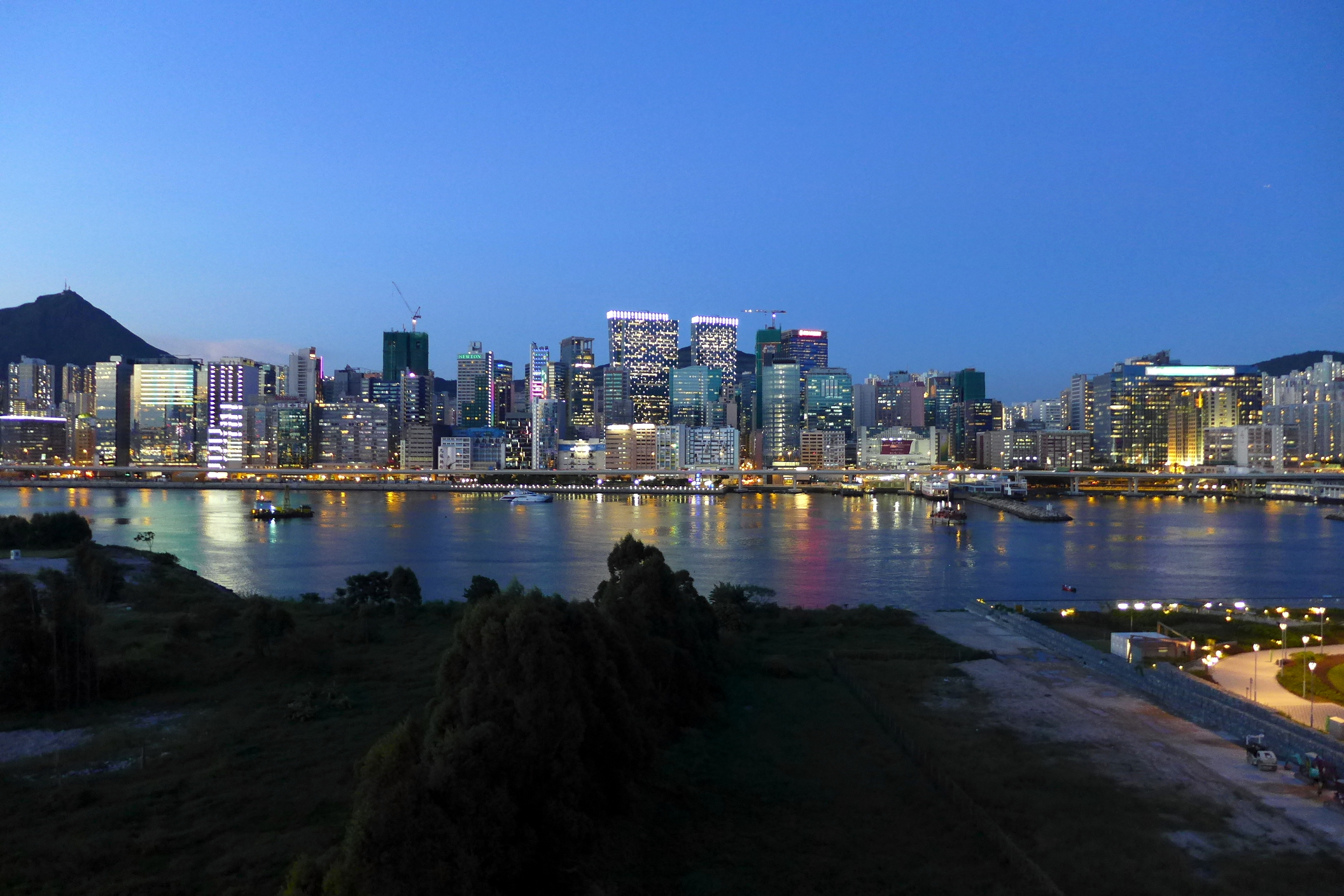
Kwun Tong Dusk View

=== Town centre ===
- Yue Man Square (裕民坊) is the heart of the town. Most of the banks' branches are located on this road. The Government District Office is located at the eastern end of Yue Man Square. More than 20 franchised bus and public mini-bus routes pass through or stop at this road. Yue Man Square is presently being demolished and replaced by a shopping centre by the Urban Renewal Authority.
- Mut Wah Street (物華街) is also called "Golden Street" because there were nearly 10 jewelry shops. It is most famous for the armed-robbery by Yip Kai-Fuen (葉繼歡) when he used an AK-47 assault rifle to rob 5 of the jewelry shops in 1992.
- Shui Wo Street (瑞和街) is a market street. It is also home to the Shui Wo Street Complex, which houses an indoor market, a public library, and a sports hall.
- Hip Wo Street (協和街) has the one and only hospital in Kwun Tong, namely United Christian Hospital, at 130 Hip Wo Street.
- Hong Ning Road (康寧道) is the "Mid-Levels" of Kwun Tong. The headquarters of Hong Kong Police Force Sau Mau Ping Division is at 200 Hong Ning Road, near Sau Mau Ping. It is also home to Hong Ning Road Park, one of the largest parks in the area.
- Tsui Ping Road (翠屏道) is located in Kwun Tong. Tsui Ping Estate. Kwun Tong Maryknoll College is located at 100 Tsui Ping Road.
- Yuet Wah Street (月華街) is located in Kwun Tong. Wo Lok Estate is situated here.
- Kwun Tong Road (觀塘道) is the main road that leads into and out of the Kwun Tong district. Kwun Tong MTR station is directly above this road. Kwun Tong's latest shopping mall, apm, is situated on this road next to Kwun Tong MTR station.
- apm Millennium City 5 is one of the largest shopping centres in East Kowloon, with its slogan "Play More Sleep Less".

=== Industrial area ===
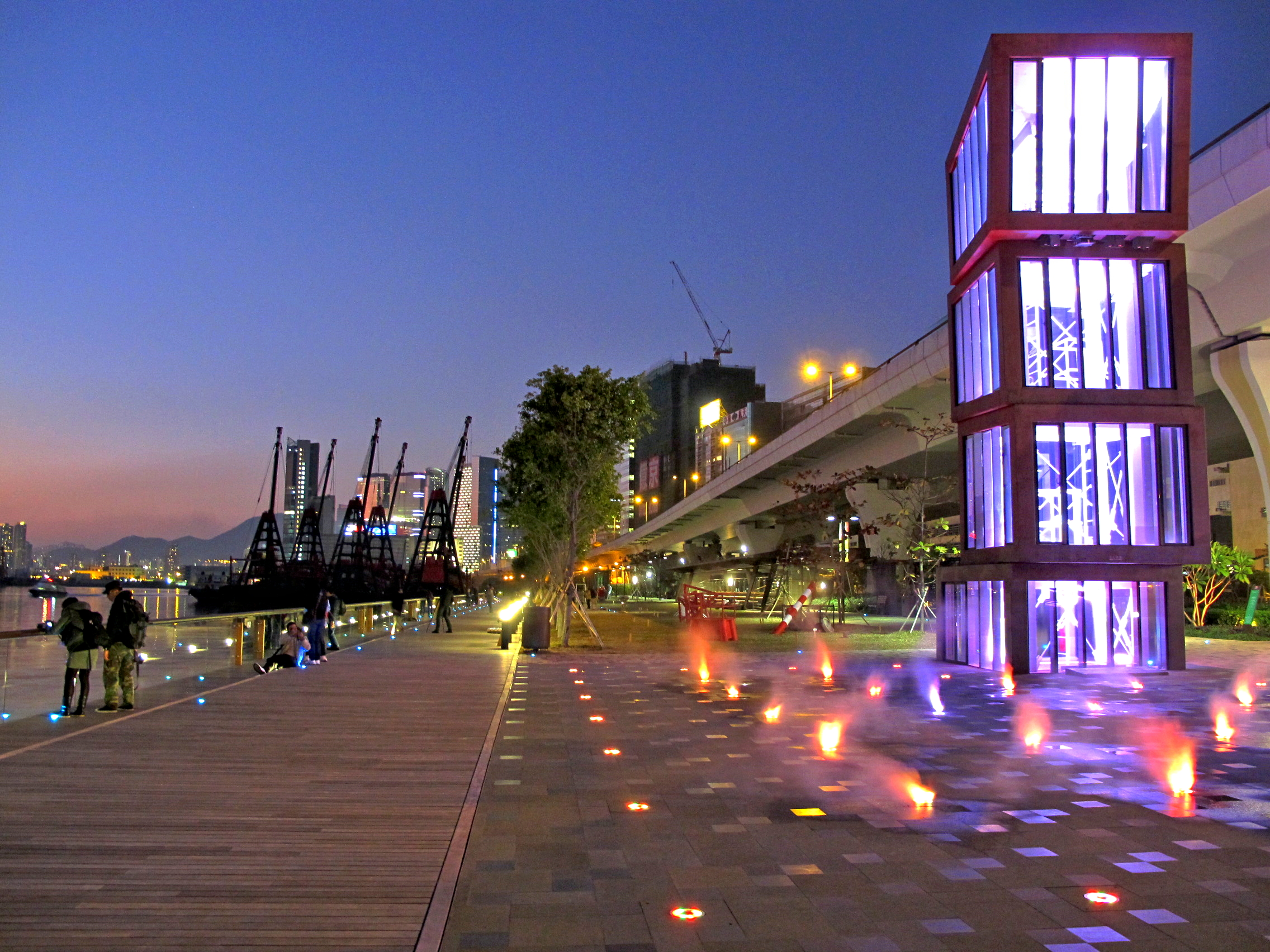
Sculpture at Kwun Tong Promenade

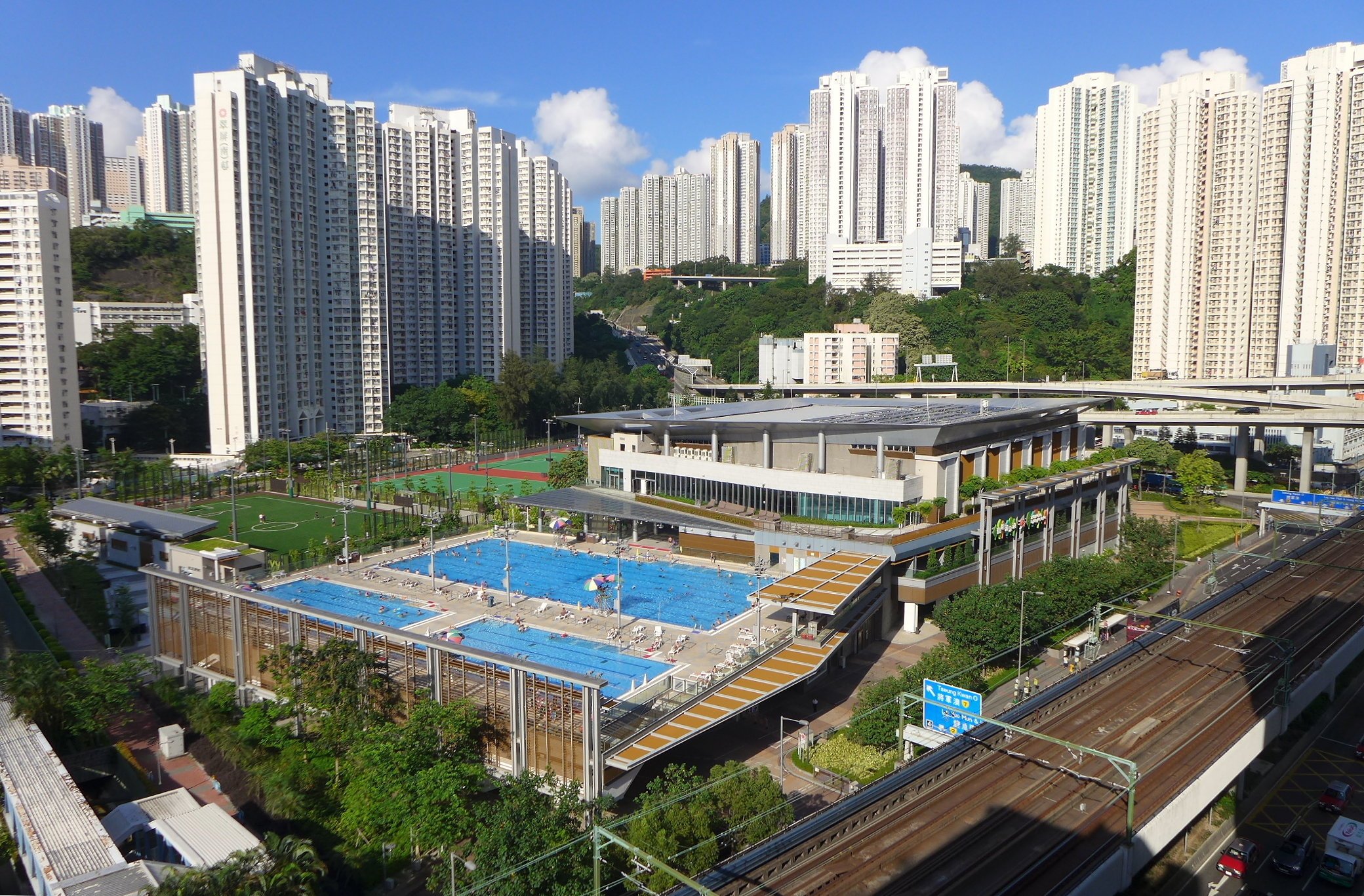
Kwun Tong Swimming Pool

Kwun Tong was one of the first and major industrial areas in Hong Kong, with factories having been built there since the 1950s. The industrial area has since then expanded to Kowloon Bay and Yau Tong. Since the manufacturing sector of Hong Kong is in decline, many factories have been torn down and commercial buildings are being constructed to replace them.

In recent years, the government has started to re-develop the coastal area of Kwun Tong to correspond with the re-development of the Kai Tak district. A promenade and a park has been built along the coast near Kwun Tong Pier.

=== Residential area ===
The residential areas in Kwun Tong are mainly located in lower Kwun Tong, to the northeast of Kwun Tong Road.

=== Locations ===
Kwun Tong is situated at the eastern part of the Kowloon Peninsula, and its boundary stretches from Lion Rock in the north to Lei Yue Mun in the south, and from the winding paths of Kowloon Peak in the east to the north coast of the Airport (Kai Tak) runway in the west.

== Economy ==
Gammon Construction has its head office in Kwun Tong. It occupies 36,900 square feet (3,430 m^{2}) of space there. It moved from Quarry Bay circa 2019.

Citibank (Hong Kong) has its head office at One Bay East.

Link REIT has its head office at The Quayside (海濱匯) in Kwun Tong.

== Education ==
- Kwun Tong Government Secondary School
- Ning Po College

Hong Kong Public Libraries maintains the Shui Wo Street Public Library in the Shui Wo Street Municipal Services Building.

== Transport ==
Kwun Tong is served by the Kwun Tong station of MTR's Kwun Tong line.

Roads that are serving the area include:

- Kwun Tong Road
- Tate's Cairn Tunnel
- Kwun Tong Bypass
- Eastern Harbour Crossing
- Tseung Kwan O Tunnel

Kwun Tong Pier used to be a major transport hub for cross-harbour passengers until the opening of the MTR and the Eastern Harbour Crossing. Today, ferry services to Sai Wan Ho and North Point are still available.

KMB bus terminus serving the area include:

- Elegance Road Bus Terminus (觀塘雅麗道巴士總站): 13M, 95M
- Yue Man Square Bus Terminus (觀塘裕民坊巴士總站): 3D, 16M, 17, 101, 101R, 101X, N3D
- Kwun Tong Ferry Pier Bus Terminus (觀塘碼頭巴士總站): 11D, 23, 40P, 55, 69C, 74B, 74C, 74D, 74E, 74F, 74P, 74X, 80, 80A, 80P, 80X, 83A, 83X, 93A, 258X, 259S, 259X, 268A, 268C, 269C, 269S, 274X, T74, X89D
- Tsui Ping Road Bus Terminus (觀塘翠屏道巴士總站): 11B, 89C, 89X
- Kwun Tong Station Bus Terminus (觀塘鐵路站巴士總站): 16M, 89, 234C, 234D

Following some recent redevelopment plans in Kwun Tong, the Yuet Wah Street Bus Terminus is about to be demolished, and the routes originally terminating there will be moved to the New Kwun Tong Station Bus Terminus and Yue Man Square Bus Terminus.

Located near the area is the former Kai Tak Airport, which is currently the site of a large cruise terminal, opened in 2013.

== See also ==
- Public housing estates in Kwun Tong
- List of areas of Hong Kong
- Old Industrial Buildings Revitalization in Hong Kong
