= Hong Ning Road Park =

Public park in Kwun Tong, Hong Kong

Coordinates: 22.3200°N 114.2241°E

- 康寧道公園
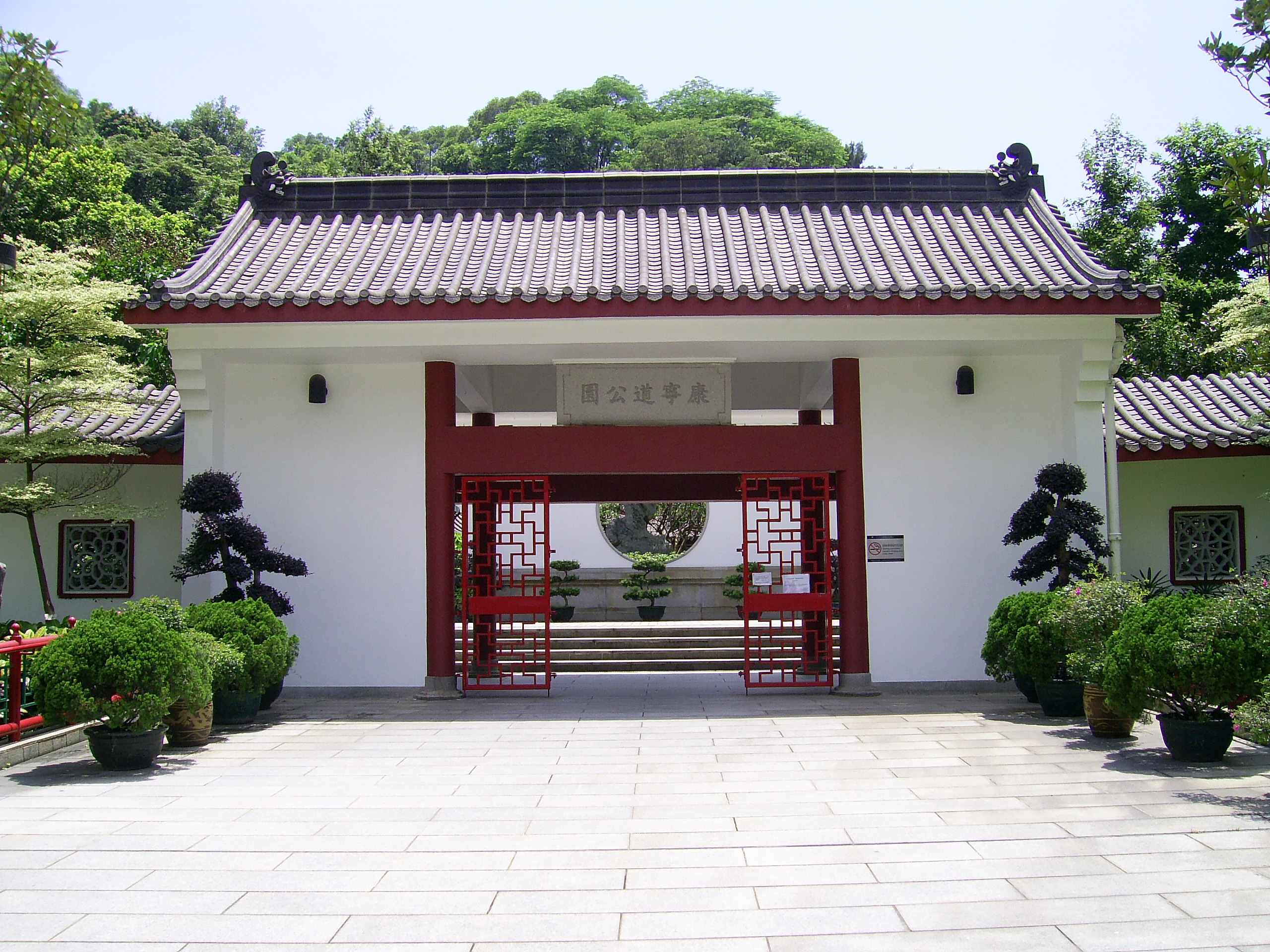
- Entrance gate of Phase 2
- Location: Ngau Tau Kok, Hong Kong
- Operator: Leisure and Cultural Services Department

Hong Ning Road Park (Chinese: 康寧道公園) is a public park between the districts of Ngau Tau Kok and Sau Mau Ping in Kowloon, Hong Kong. It is divided into two phases linked by a staircase. The park is distinct from the similarly-named Hong Ning Road Recreation Ground, which is located down the hill closer to Kwun Tong Town Centre.

== History ==
The park was first planned by the former Urban Council as early as 1977. At that time, the site was home to the Hong Ning Road Licensed Area (a squatter area). In 1976 it was reported that there were 1,433 people living in poor conditions here. Most residents were resettled in modern public housing.

During heavy rainfall on 12 June 2001 and 27 June 2001, boulders fell from the hillslope above Hong Ning Road Park (Phase 2), causing minor damage and resulting in the temporary closure of the park.

== Description ==
Hong Ning Road Park (Phase 1) has numerous sports facilities. It was designed by Liang Peddle Thorp Architects in a contemporary style and built by Kaden Construction Limited at a cost of $62 million between April 1997 to March 1999. More than 60,000 cubic metres of material was excavated in the course of construction. Phase 1 comprises a children's playground, fitness stations, a jogging track, a gateball court, tennis courts, and a building housing the park office, toilets, and changing room.

Hong Ning Road Park (Phase 2) is a Chinese-style garden with various pavilions, a fish pond, and a public toilet. The park has a tranquil environment and is linked to Phase 1 via a long staircase. The name is actually a misnomer, as Phase 2 is located on Hip Wo Street and has no frontage on Hong Ning Road.

== Redevelopment plan ==
The government plans to redevelop the existing Tsun Yip Street Playground, in the Kwun Tong Industrial Estate, into a "Kwun Tong Industrial Culture Park". Hence, the government proposes to reprovision the displaced facilities from Tsun Yip Street Playground to the Hong Ning Road Park (Phase 1).

Preliminary plans by the Architectural Services Department indicate that the existing gateball court will be replaced with basketball courts, the existing tennis courts will be replaced with a football pitch, and the existing changing room block will be replaced with a bridge structure connecting to a new gateball court on top of the hill.
