= Public housing estates in Kwun Tong =

Public housing in Kwun Tong, Hong Kong

The following shows the public housing estates (including Home Ownership Scheme (HOS), Private Sector Participation Scheme (PSPS), Tenants Purchase Scheme (TPS)) in Kwun Tong of Kwun Tong District, Kowloon, Hong Kong.

== Overview ==
The Kwun Tong area has 6 housing estates in total: 3 Public Housing Estates, 2 Home Ownership Scheme (HOS) housing estates, and 1 Tenants Purchase Scheme (TPS) housing estate. All of which are managed by the Hong Kong Housing Society.

Name		Type	Inaug.	No Blocks	No Units	Notes
Cheung Wo Court	祥和苑	HOS	1984	6	1,584	
Po Pui Court	寶珮苑	HOS	1995	5	1,750	
Tsui Ping (North) Estate	翠屏(北)邨	TPS	1982	12	3,913	
Tsui Ping (South) Estate	翠屏(南)邨	Public	1989	7	5,039	
Wan Hon Estate	雲漢邨	Public	1998	2	1,003	
Wo Lok Estate	和樂邨	Public	1962	11	1,941	

== Cheung Wo Court ==
Cheung Wo Court (Chinese: 祥和苑) is a Home Ownership Scheme court in Hip Wo Street, Kwun Tong, opposite to Po Pui Court. It consists of 6 blocks built in 1984.

=== Houses ===
Name	Type	Completion
Wo Kwan House	Flexi 1, 2	1984
Wo Yuet House	Flexi 1, 2	1984
Wo Shing House	Flexi 1, 2	1984
Wo Kin House	Flexi 1, 2	1984
Wo Hang House	Slab	1984
Wo Tung House	Flexi 1, 2	1984

== Po Pui Court ==
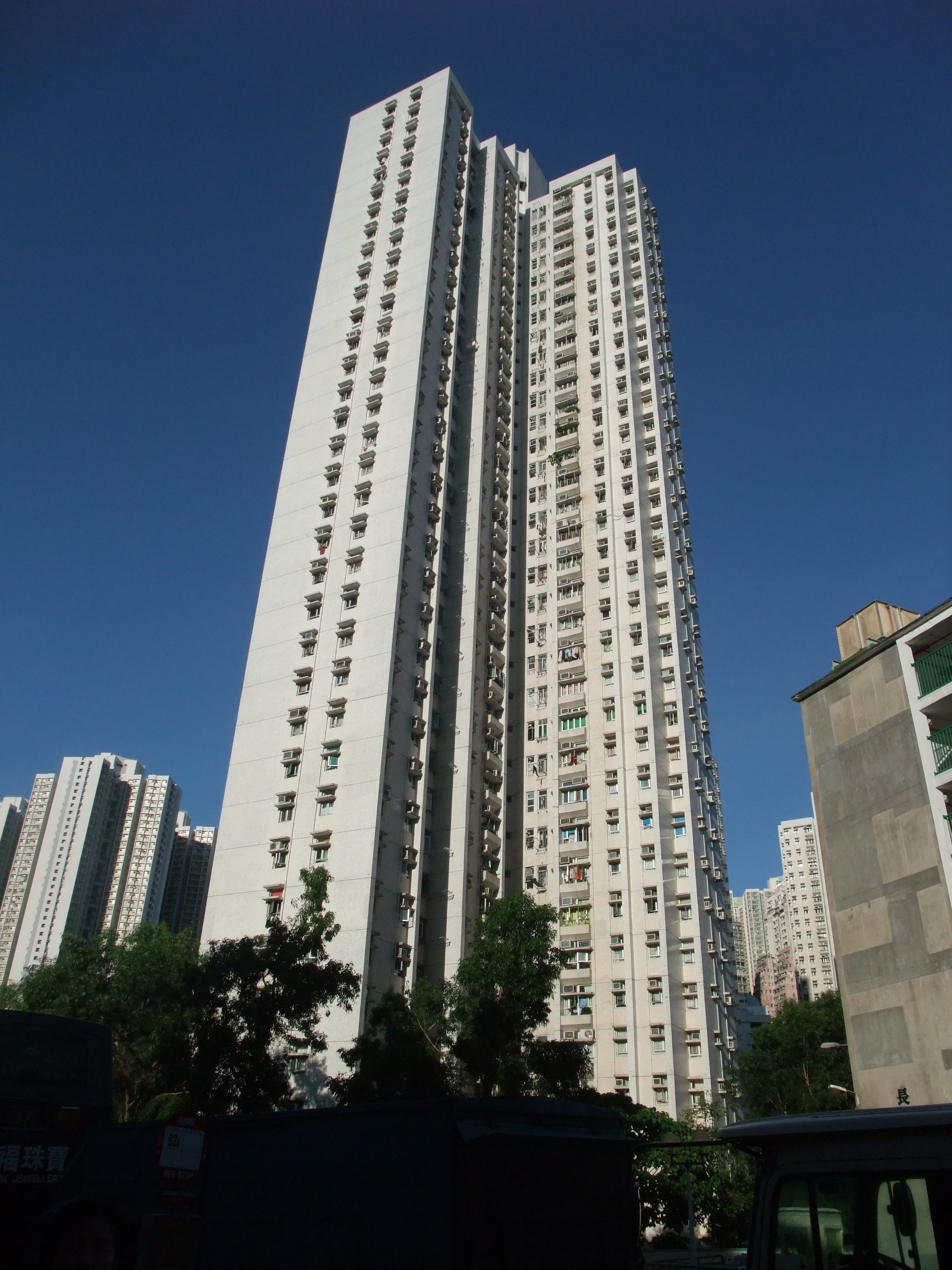
Po Yiu House of Po Pui Court

Po Pui Court (Chinese: 寶珮苑) is a Home Ownership Scheme court in Hip Wo Street, Kwun Tong, opposite to Cheung Wo Court. It consists of 5 blocks built in 1995.

=== Houses ===
Name	Type	Completion
Po Shan House	New Cruciform (Ver.1984)	1995
Po Wu House	New Cruciform (Ver.1984)	1995
Po Ying House	New Cruciform (Ver.1984)	1995
Po Chui House	New Cruciform (Ver.1984)	1995
Po Yiu House	New Cruciform (Ver.1984)	1995

== Tsui Ping Estate ==
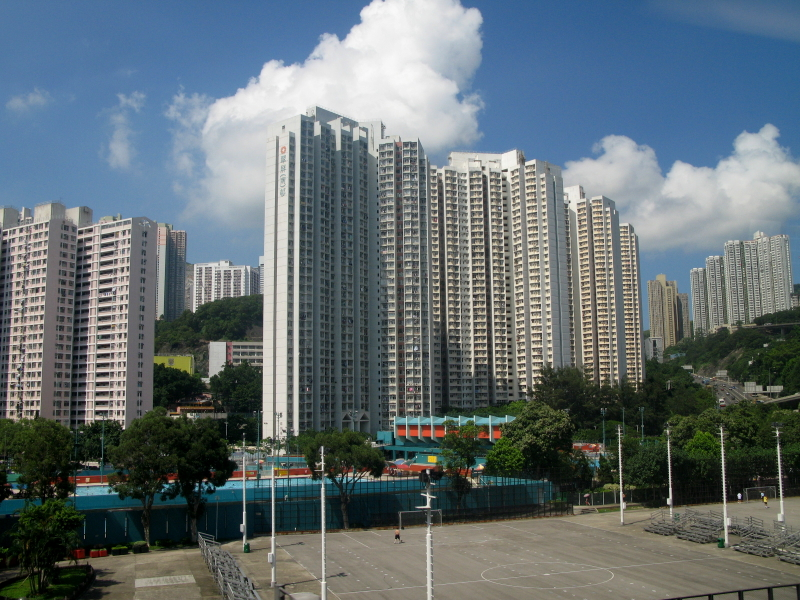
Tsui Ping (South) Estate

Tsui Ping Estate (Chinese: 翠屏邨) is an estate redeveloped in the 1980s and the 1990s. It is divided into Tsui Ping (South) Estate (Chinese: 翠屏(南)邨) and Tsui Ping (North) Estate (Chinese: 翠屏(北)邨). The redeveloped estate has 19 blocks in total.

== Wan Hon Estate ==
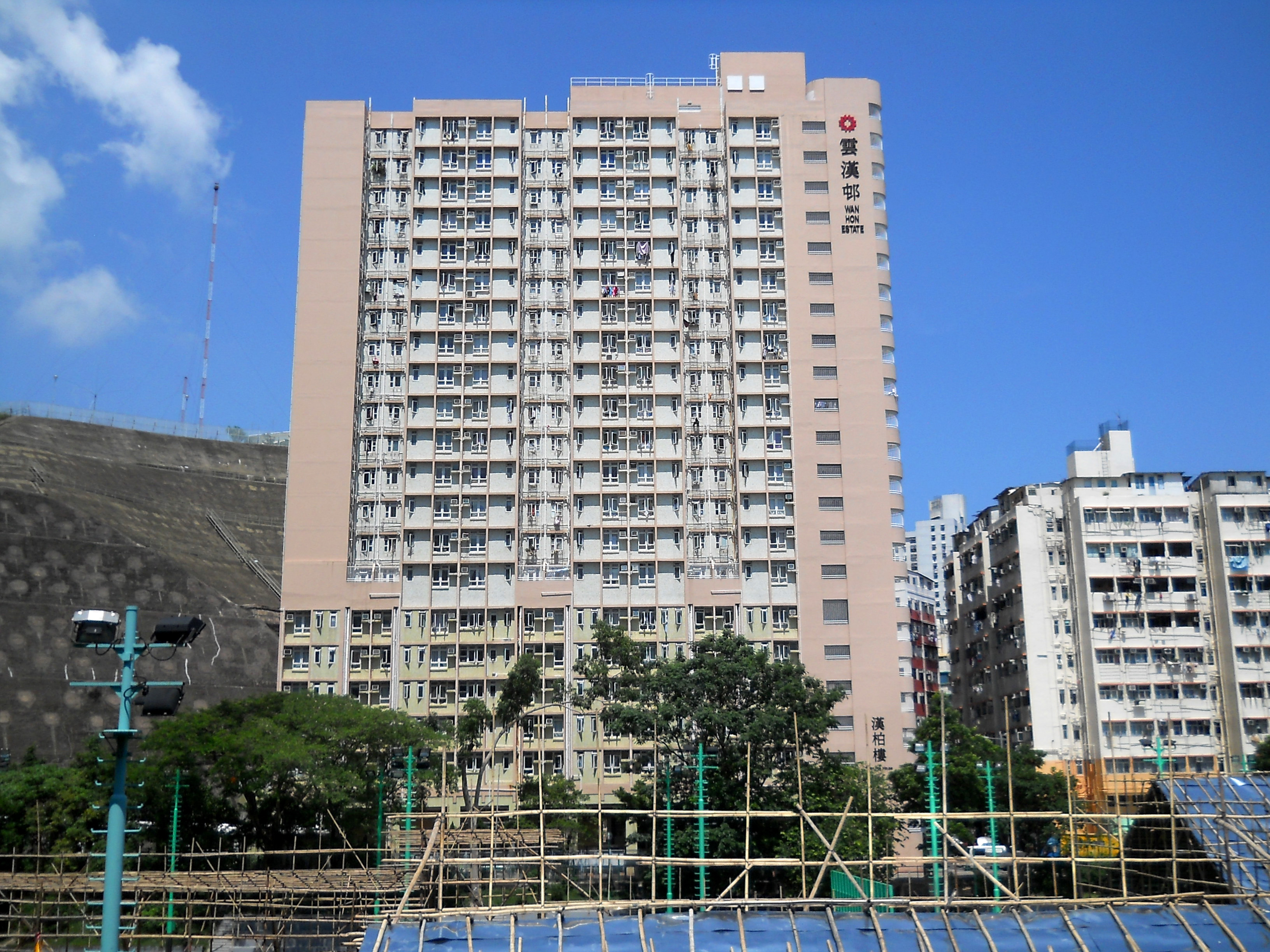
Hon Pak House of Wan Hon Estate

Wan Hon Estate (Chinese: 雲漢邨) is named for nearby Wan Hon Street, the estate consists of two blocks completed in 1998. It was built on the site of a former squatter area, which was cleared in the 1970s and left vacant until Wan Hon Estate started construction in 1996.

=== Houses ===
Name	Type	Completion
Hon Chung House	Small Household Block	1998
Hon Pak House	Small Household Block	1998

== Wo Lok Estate ==
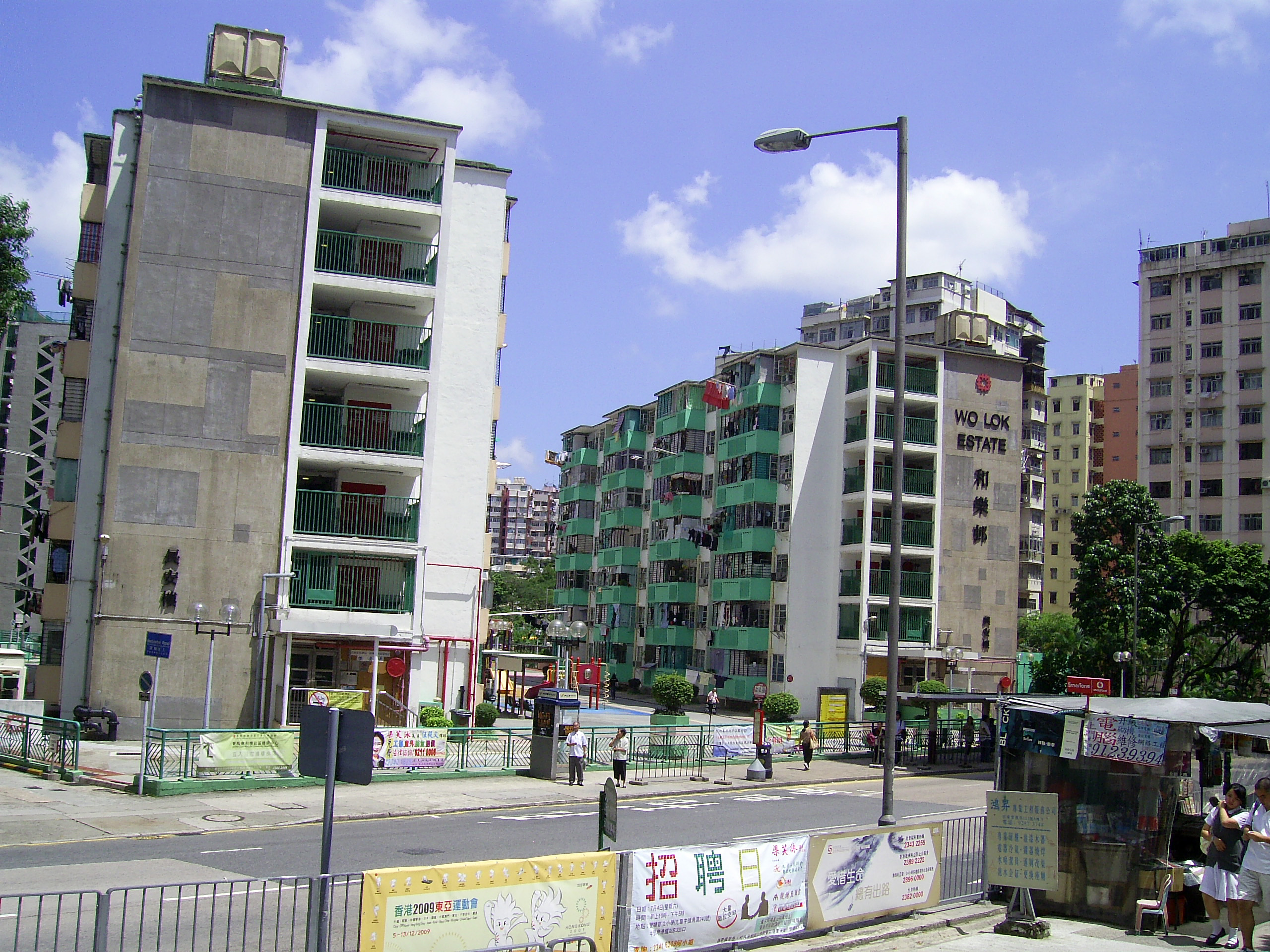
Seven-storey blocks in Wo Lok Estate

Wo Lok Estate (Chinese: 和樂邨) the oldest existing public housing estate in Kwun Tong District, and the first public housing estate with seven-storeys blocks.

The estate comprises 11 blocks of buildings of Old Slab type built from 1962 to 1966. It was developed into 2 phases. Phase 1 included 8 seven-storey blocks built in 1962 and 1963, while Phase 2 included 3 blocks built in 1965 and 1966. In 2007, the government evaluated the condition of the buildings, and found them all structurally sound. However, structural repair and improvement works were carried out to sustain the buildings for the next 15 years.

=== Houses ===
Name	Type	Completion
Kin On House	Old Slab	1962
Tai On House	Old Slab	1962
Ping On House	Old Slab	1962
Yee On House	Old Slab	1962
Cheung On House	Old Slab	1963
Hing On House	Old Slab	1963
Fu On House	Old Slab	1963
Man On House	Old Slab	1963
Kui On House	Old Slab	1965
Sun On House	Old Slab	1965
Hang On House	Old Slab	1966

== See also ==
- Public housing estates in Ngau Tau Kok and Kowloon Bay
- Public housing estates in Sze Shun
- Public housing estates in Lam Tin
- Public housing estates in Yau Tong
