= Kwun Tong Maryknoll College =

Secondary school in Hong Kong

Coordinates: 22.31850°N 114.22870°E

Kwun Tong Maryknoll College 觀塘瑪利諾書院
- School emblem
- 100 Tsui Ping Road, Kwun Tong, Kowloon; Hong Kong

Information
- School type: Grant school, boys' only, Secondary
- Motto: Kindness, Trust, Modesty, Courtesy, Loyalty, Endurance
- Denomination: Catholic
- Established: 1971
- School district: Kwun Tong
- Principal: Caroline Sin Nga-lam
- Supervisor: Rev Joseph Fung Che-ho
- Faculty: 63
- Grades: Form 1 – Form 6
- Campus size: 84,600 sq ft (7,860 m^{2})
- Colour: Carmine
- Newspaper: "Evergreen" (Chinese: 長青)
- Yearbook: "School Year Book"
- Affiliation: Roman Catholic Diocese of Hong Kong
- Houses: Kindness, Trust, Modesty, Courtesy
- Website: www.ktmc.edu.hk

Kwun Tong Maryknoll College
- Traditional Chinese: 觀塘瑪利諾書院
- Simplified Chinese: 观塘玛利诺书院
Transcriptions
Standard Mandarin
- Hanyu Pinyin: Guàntáng Mǎlìnuò Shūyuàn
Yue: Cantonese
- Jyutping: gun1 tong4 maa5 lei6 nok6 syu1 jyun6*2

Kwun Tong Maryknoll College (Chinese: 觀塘瑪利諾書院; KTMC) is a Catholic boys' secondary school in Hong Kong. It was established in 1971 by the Maryknoll Fathers, a society of Catholic priests and brothers founded in the United States in 1911. The college's anniversary day is the first Friday in May.

KTMC is one of a number of schools in Hong Kong which uses English as the medium of instruction (EMI schools) except Chinese-related subjects.

== History ==
=== Foundation ===
In the late 1950s, the Maryknoll Fathers had begun working in the Kwun Tong area. In 1962, the Maryknoll Father Society asked the Education Department for assistance in building a subsidised Anglo-Chinese secondary school in Kwun Tong. The planning of the school was delayed by the unrest of the late 1960s and the serious inflation which upset all cost estimates. Groundbreaking occurred in the summer of 1971 and the construction of the school building began. The school was founded finally in 1971.

Before completion of the school campus, students had to use the classrooms at Sing Yin Secondary School for lessons. Unfortunately, the opening of the new school building was delayed for three weeks due to the Sau Mau Ping landslide on 18 June 1972, but students were able to take possession of the new building on 25 September 1972.

== School emblem ==
The emblem of Kwun Tong Maryknoll College was designed by its first supervisor, Rev. John Cioppa, M.M., using the symbol of the Maryknoll Father Society – the "Chi-Rho". There are two Greek letters: Chi written as "X" and Rho written as "P". These are the first two letters of the Greek word for Christ (χριστός). The round figure, or oval, is said to represent the globe or world for whom Christ came as Saviour. Thus, the emblem intends to show the school's unity with the work of the Maryknoll Fathers in many countries throughout the world, the work of bringing Christ's love to all people and races.

== Headmasters and supervisors ==
A list of Kwun Tong Maryknoll College supervisors since its founding in 1971.

Name	Years in office
Rev. Joseph Fung Che-ho	2009–
Rev. Mario Gutierrez Carrejo MG	2005–2009
Rev. Salvador Sanchez	2002–2005
Mr. Lam Minh	2000–2002
Rev. Piet Devos	1996–2000
Rev. Joseph Yim Tak Lung	1995–1996
Rev. Piet Devos	1987–1995
Rev. Dominic Kong Yun Kwan	1982–1987
Rev. John E. Geitner	1973–1982
Rev. John A. Cioppa	1971–1973

A list of Kwun Tong Maryknoll College principals since its founding in 1971.

Name	Years in office
Ms Caroline Sin Nga Lam	2022–
Mr. Joseph Yee Kin Wah	2011–2022
Mr. Kung Kwong Pui	2008–2011
Mr. Li Pui Sang	1987–2008
Mr. Chan Jan Wai	1978–1987
Mr. Chiu Woon Lam	1973–1978
Rev. John E. Geitner	1971–1973

== Facilities ==
The college has an area of 84,600 sq ft (7,860 m^{2}) and is one of the largest secondary schools in Kwun Tong District by area. As of 2024, it has the following facilities:

- a school hall
- a canteen
- three covered playgrounds
- a gymnasium
- a basketball court
- a volleyball court
- a student activities centre
- a lawn
- a gardening zone
- a pastoral centre
- a campus TV room
- five laboratories (two physics labs, two chemistry labs, and one biology lab)
- two computer assisted learning rooms
- a geography room
- an English language room
- a Chinese language room
- a social science room
- a cultural subject room
- a music room
- an art room
- a STEM room

== Admission ==
Half of the college's total Form 1 intake are from primary schools in Kwun Tong District, with the remaining from other districts like Tseung Kwan O and Wong Tai Sin District. Every year, applicants are invited to attend an admission interview conducted in English. Other admission selection criteria include applicants' performance in extra-curricular activities, awards, and certificates. Due to good reputation and alumni's achievements, there is keen competition among applicants during the admission selection procedure.

== School song ==
The school song was written by Mr. Lo Yui-chi; lyrics were by Rev. John Geitner. M.M.

== College Publications ==
The Student Publications Committee, part of the school's student council, is responsible for publishing a school yearbook and two issues of school newspaper annually.

=== School Yearbook ===
The School Yearbook for each academic year is published in September in the following academic year.

=== Evergreen ===
Evergreen (Chinese: 長青) is the school's newspaper. Two issues are published for each academic year.

== Activities and achievements ==
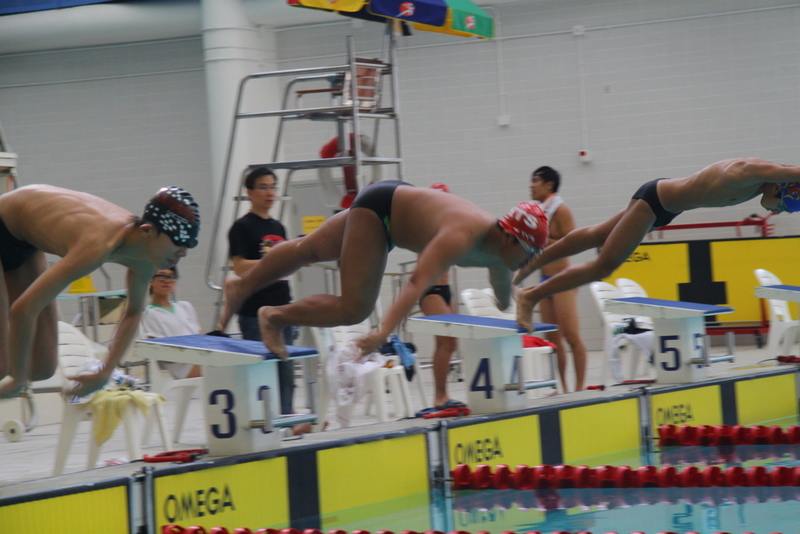
Maryknoll Swimmers

=== Academic ===
Maryknollers are required to have two tests (1st – 8th test day) and two examinations (Mid Year and Final Examination) every year.

Students have consistently performed well in public examinations. In 2002, the first ever student to achieve 10 distinctions (10 As) in the Hong Kong Certificate of Education Examination (HKCEE), Li Ki-kwong, was produced. Li was then admitted by the Faculty of Medicine of the University of Hong Kong through the Early Admission Scheme and graduated in 2007. In 2010, the final year of the HKCEE, the college produced another student achieving 10 distinctions, Chu Chi-ho.

=== Extra-curricular ===
The college has eight Academic Groups, 11 Recreational Groups, 2 Religious Groups and 11 Service Groups such as the Community Youth Club, the Junior Police Call, and the Youth Red Cross. It provides students with many opportunities to participate in community services through the service clubs or groups. Social services undertaken include collecting second-hand clothes, flag-selling activities for charitable purposes and visiting nursing homes. And Activity section comprises many clubs which cater for various interest groups.

In sports, Kwun Tong Maryknoll College has conquered champions in bowling, basketball, cross country, football, trampoline, softball, and swimming competitions. Besides, KTMC students also participate in other competitions, such as art, business, computer programming, drama, International Physics Olympiad, mathematics, singing, and the Hong Kong Schools Music and Speech Festival.

== Alumni (Maryknollers) ==
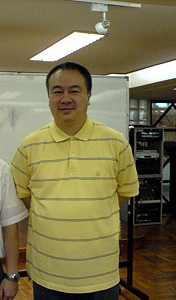
Clifton Ko

Cultural

- Clifton Ko MH – Hong Kong Film director, actor, producer and scriptwriter.
- Keith Chan Siu-kei – Chinese lyricist and writer
- Kei Wan Yuen (阮紀宏) – deputy editor-in-chief of Ming Pao
- Wallace Kwok (郭啟華) – DJ, Chinese lyricist and writer
- Gabriel Wong (黃一山) – Actor and screenwriter
- Donald Tong (唐劍康) – DJ and singer

Government

- Patrick Nip Tak-kuen GBS JP – former Secretary for the Civil Service, former Secretary for Constitutional and Mainland Affairs
