= Yue Man Square =

Town centre of Kwun Tong, Hong Kong

Coordinates: 22.31361°N 114.22464°E

- Chinese: 裕民坊
Transcriptions
Standard Mandarin
- Hanyu Pinyin: Yùmín fāng
- Bopomofo: ㄩˋ ㄇㄧㄣˊ ㄈㄤ
- Wade–Giles: Yü^{4}-min^{2} fang^{1}
- IPA: [ŷ.mǐn fáŋ]
Yue: Cantonese
- Yale Romanization: Yuhmàhn fōng
- Jyutping: jyu6 man4 fong1
- IPA: [jy˨.mɐn˩ fɔŋ˥]

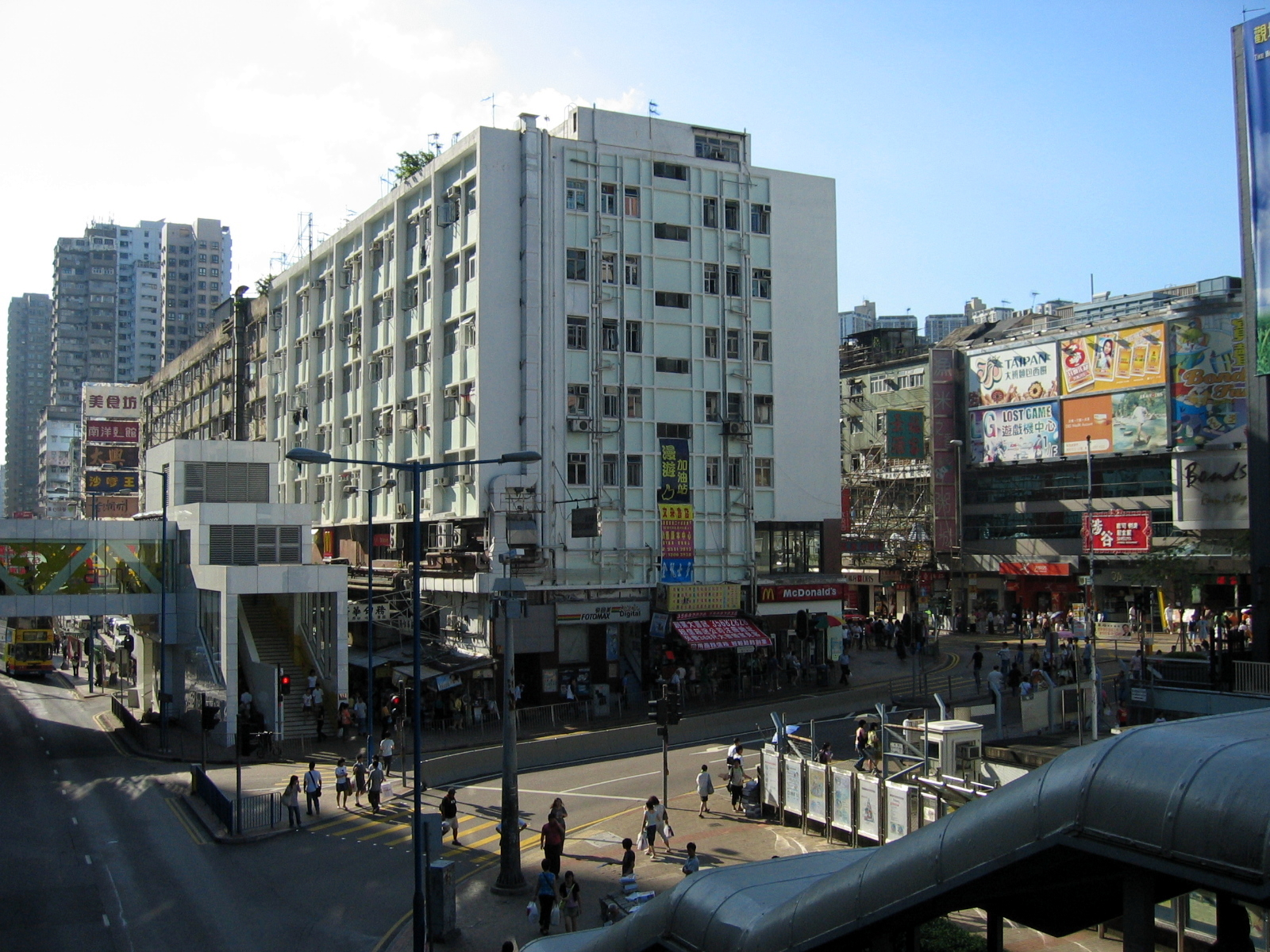
Yue Man Square

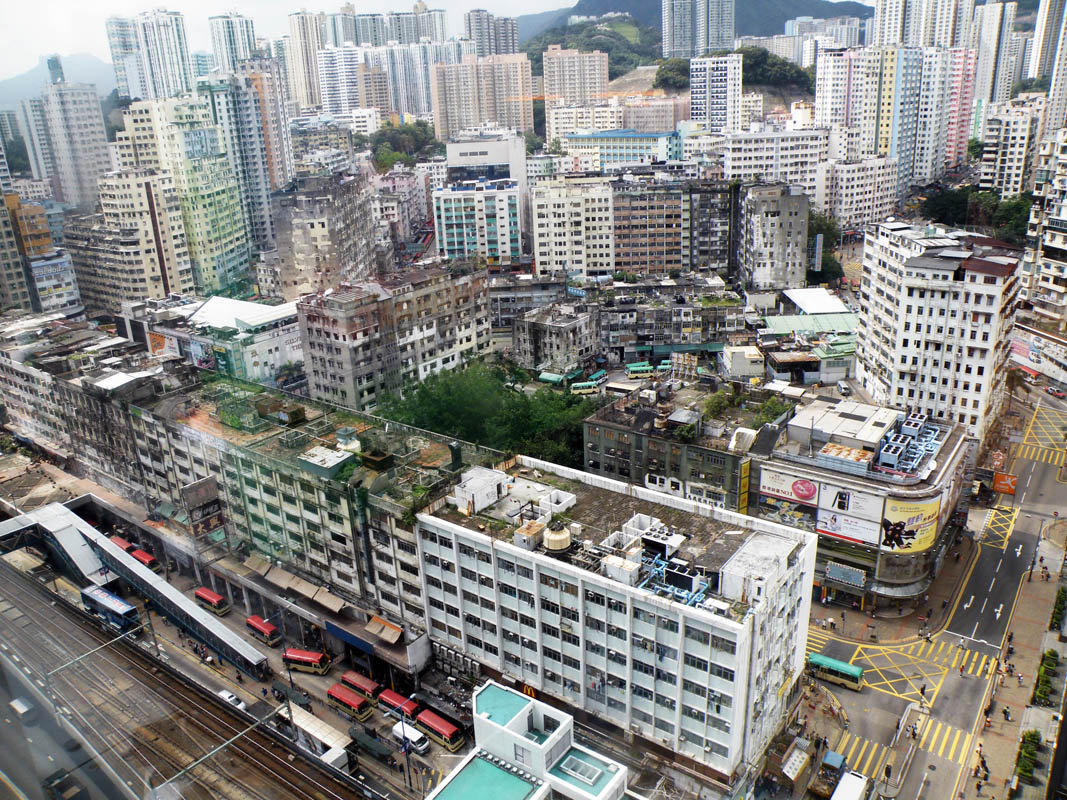
Yue Man Square and surroundings

Yue Man Square (Chinese: 裕民坊; Cantonese Yale: Yuhmàhn fōng) is the town centre of Kwun Tong in Kowloon of Hong Kong. It is also the commercial centre in the area.

== History ==
Located in the town centre, in late 1950s and early 1960s, the street attracted shops of various trades, including banking, jewellery, fashion, grocery and cinema. Restaurants offered different schools of Chinese cuisines.

== Redevelopment ==
The Hong Kong Government had plans to redevelop the town centre. Concerns were raised as many completed projects had destroyed the traditional communities, culture and heritage. The redevelopment, which opened alongside a new bus interchange, opened in April 2021.

== Education ==
Yue Man Square is in the Primary One Admission (POA) School Net 48. Within the school net are multiple aided schools (operated independently but funded with government money) as well as the Kwun Tong Government Primary School.
