= Wo Lok Estate =

Public housing estate in Kwun Tong, Hong Kong

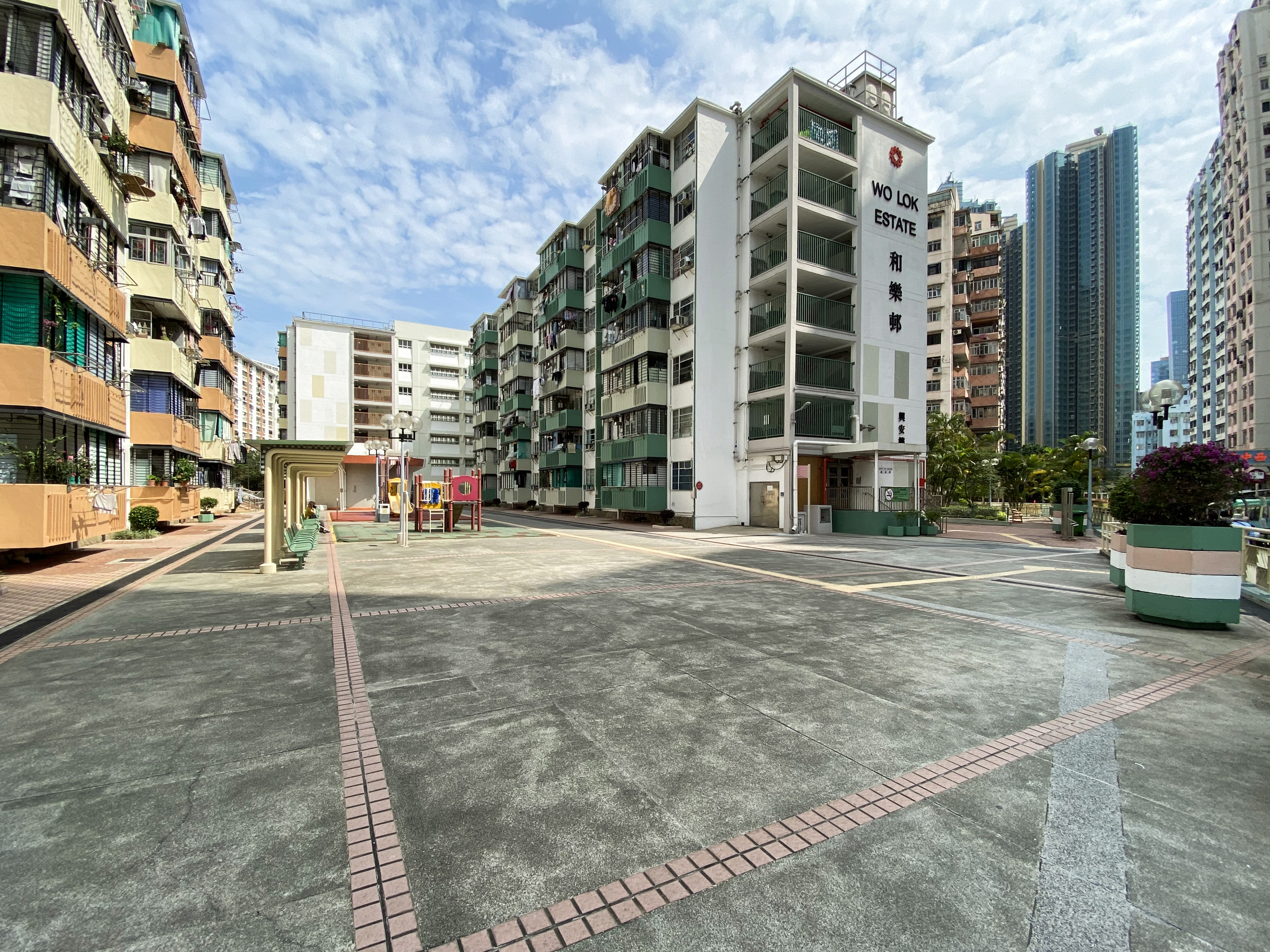
- Wo Lok Estate
- Interactive map of Wo Lok Estate

General information
- Location: 60 Yuet Wah Street, Kwun Tong; Kowloon, Hong Kong
- Coordinates: 22.3164612°N 114.2276008°E
- Status: Completed
- Category: Public rental housing
- Population: 4,381 (2016)
- No. of blocks: 8
- No. of units: 1,941

Construction
- Constructed: 1962; 64 years ago
- Authority: Hong Kong Housing Authority

Wo Lok Estate
- Traditional Chinese: 和樂邨
- Simplified Chinese: 和乐邨
Transcriptions
Standard Mandarin
- Hanyu Pinyin: Hélè Cūn
Yue: Cantonese
- Jyutping: wo4 lok6 cyun1

Wo Lok Estate (Chinese: 和樂邨) is a public housing estate in Kwun Tong, Kowloon, Hong Kong. It is the oldest existing public housing estate in Kwun Tong District, and the first public housing estate with seven-storey blocks. It comprises 11 blocks of buildings of Old Slab type built from 1962 to 1966. It was developed into 2 phases. Phase 1 included 8 seven-storey blocks built in 1962 and 1963, while Phase 2 included 3 blocks built in 1965 and 1966.

== Background ==
In 2007, the Hong Kong Government evaluated the condition of the buildings, and found them all structurally sound. However, structural repair and improvement works were carried out to sustain the buildings for the next 15 years.

== Houses ==
Name	Chinese name	Building type	Completed
Kin On House	建安樓	Old Slab	1962
Tai On House	泰安樓	Old Slab	1962
Ping On House	平安樓	Old Slab	1962
Yee On House	義安樓	Old Slab	1962
Cheung On House	長安樓	Old Slab	1963
Hing On House	興安樓	Old Slab	1963
Fu On House	富安樓	Old Slab	1963
Man On House	民安樓	Old Slab	1963
Kui On House	居安樓	Old Slab	1965
Sun On House	新安樓	Old Slab	1965
Hang On House	恆安樓	Old Slab	1966

== Demographics ==
According to the 2016 by-census, Wo Lok Estate had a population of 4,381. The median age was 48.8 and the majority of residents (98.2 per cent) were of Chinese ethnicity. The average household size was 2.3 people. The median monthly household income of all households (i.e. including both economically active and inactive households) was HK$16,000.

== Politics ==
Wo Lok Estate is located in Po Lok constituency of the Kwun Tong District Council. It is currently represented by Cheng Keng-ieong, who was elected in the 2019 elections.

== Education ==
Wo Lok Estate is in Primary One Admission (POA) School Net 48. Within the school net are multiple aided schools (operated independently but funded with government money) and Kwun Tong Government Primary School.

== See also ==
- Public housing estates in Kwun Tong
